= Andrei Sinyavsky =

Soviet Russian literary critic, writer and dissident

Andrei Donatovich Sinyavsky
- Андрей Донатович Синявский
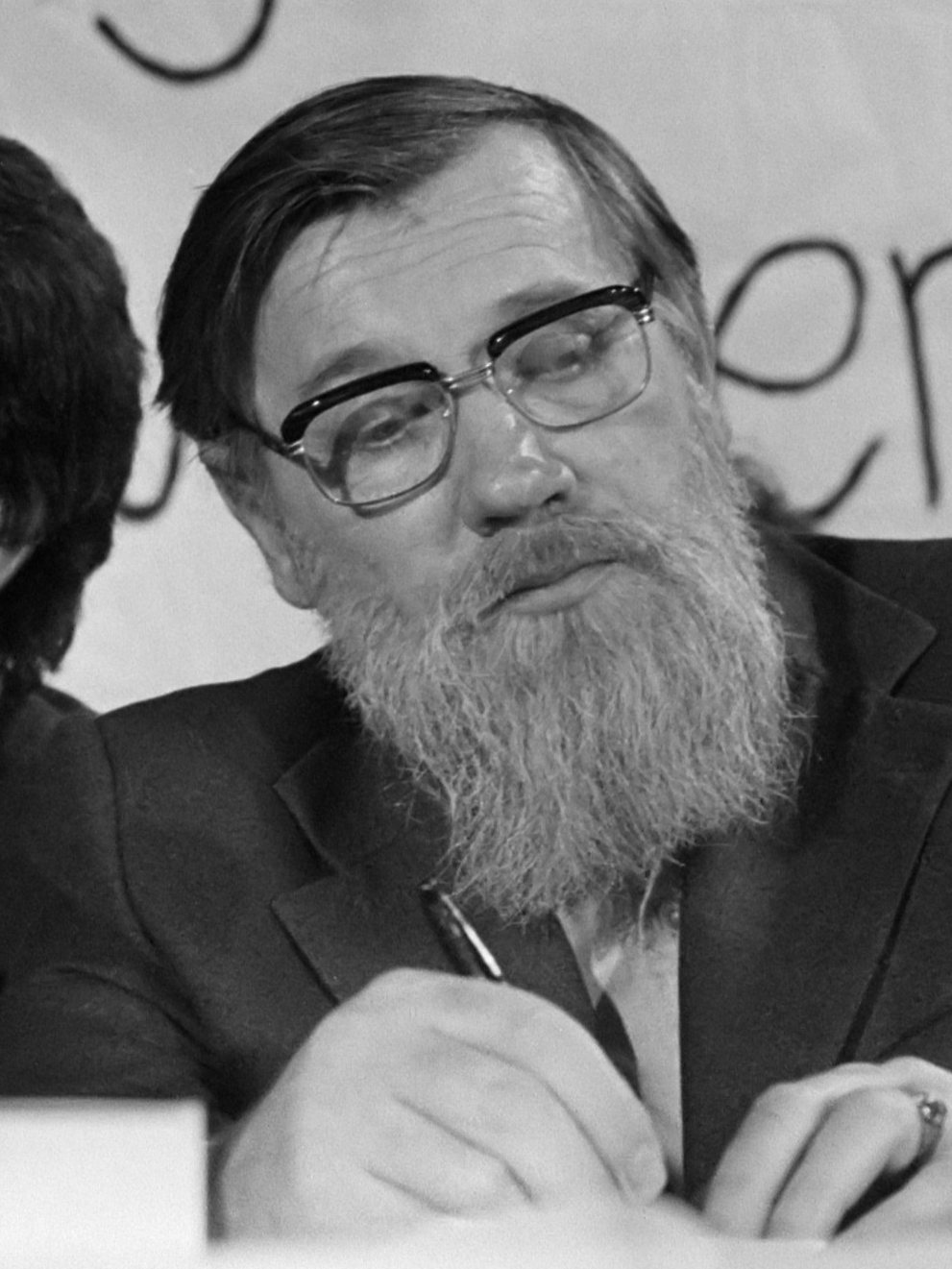
- Sinyavsky in Amsterdam, 29 November 1975
- Born: October 8, 1925; Moscow, Russian SFSR, Soviet Union
- Died: February 25, 1997 (aged 71); Fontenay-aux-Roses, France
- Education: Moscow State University
- Occupations: Writer, publisher, literary critic
- Spouse: Maria Rozanova
- Children: Iegor Gran
- Writing career
- Pen name: Abram Tertz
- Literary movement: Magic realism

Signature
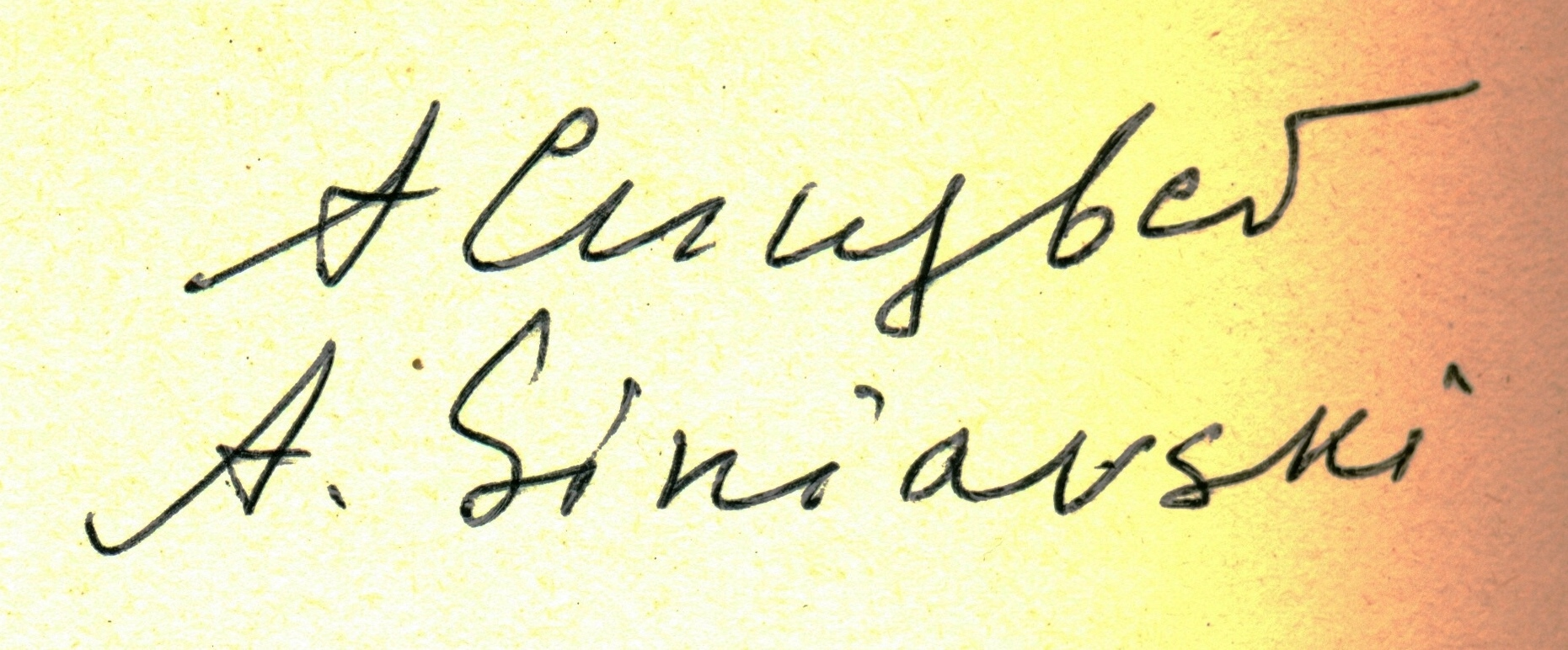

Andrei Donatovich Sinyavsky (Russian: Андре́й Дона́тович Синя́вский; 8 October 1925 – 25 February 1997) was a Russian writer and Soviet dissident known as a defendant in the Sinyavsky–Daniel trial of 1965.

Sinyavsky was a literary critic for Novy Mir and wrote works critical of Soviet society under the pseudonym Abram Tertz (Абрам Терц) published in the West to avoid censorship in the Soviet Union. Sinyavsky and Yuli Daniel were convicted of Anti-Soviet agitation in a show trial, becoming the first Soviet writers convicted solely for their works and for fiction, and served six years at a labour camp. Sinyavsky emigrated to France in 1973 where he became a professor of Russian literature and published numerous autobiographical and retrospective works.

== Early life and education ==
Andrei Donatovich Sinyavsky was born on 8 October 1925 in Moscow, the son of Donat Evgenievich Sinyavsky, a Russian nobleman from Syzran who became a member of the Left Socialist-Revolutionaries, and a mother of a Russian peasant background. Donat was arrested several times by the Bolsheviks after the October Revolution as an "enemy of the people", and during his last stay in jail the medical authorities took his electroencephalographic reading. Sinyavsky described his father's experiences in the autobiographical novel Goodnight!

Sinyavsky's family was evacuated to Syzran following the German invasion of the Soviet Union in 1941, where he graduated from school in 1943. Sinyavsky was drafted into the Red Army after graduation and served as a radio engineer at an airfield. In 1945, Sinyavsky became a philology student at Moscow State University, becoming a full-time student following his demobilization from the Red Army the next year, and studied the works of Vladimir Mayakovsky. Sinyavsky graduated in 1949 and attended graduate school where he successfully defended his thesis in 1952. Sinyavsky worked at the Gorky Institute of World Literature in Moscow and taught at Moscow State University's Faculty of Journalism and the Moscow Art Theatre School. By the end of 1960, he was admitted into the Union of Soviet Writers.

Sinyavsky became one of the leading literary critics of the Novy Mir magazine, at the time headed by Aleksandr Tvardovsky. In the early 1960s, Novy Mir was considered the most liberal legal publications in the Soviet Union, and Sinyavsky began leaning towards a dissident position. In November 1962, Novy Mir became famous for publishing Aleksandr Solzhenitsyn's groundbreaking One Day in the Life of Ivan Denisovich, a novella about a prisoner of the Gulag. Sinyavsky, a protégé of Boris Pasternak, described the realities of Soviet life in short fiction stories which were often critical in nature. Sinyavsky published his novels in the West under the pseudonym Abram Tertz, derived from the name of a historical Russian Jewish gangster, although Sinyavsky himself was not Jewish. Sinyavsky's works were naturally rejected for publication by the Communist Party of the Soviet Union (CPSU) during a time of extreme censorship.

== Sinyavsky–Daniel trial ==
On 4 September 1965, Sinyavsky was arrested along with fellow-writer and friend Yuli Daniel, and tried in the first Soviet show trial during which writers were openly convicted solely for their literary work. Sinyavsky and Daniel were arrested as part of widespread political repression in the Soviet Union due to their works critical of Soviet life being published abroad. Legally, Sinyavsky and Daniel could not be charged for their publications outside the Soviet Union, and instead were charged under Article 70 of the Russian SFSR Criminal Code for producing materials labeled as "Anti-Soviet agitation". This was the first time anti-Soviet laws were applied to works of fiction. Dozens of Soviet writers and intellectuals came to the defence of Sinyavsky and Daniel, and on 5 December 1965 held the Glasnost meeting in Moscow, the first spontaneous public political demonstration in the Soviet Union after the Second World War. The Sinyavsky–Daniel trial was accompanied by harsh propaganda campaigns in the Soviet media, perceived as a sign of demise of the Khrushchev Thaw which had allowed greater freedoms of expression during the late 1950s and early 1960s.

On 14 February 1966, Sinyavsky was sentenced to seven years on charges of "anti-Soviet activity" for the opinions of his fictional characters. After the trial, 63 supporters of Sinyavsky and Daniel signed a petition requesting their release. In response to the petition, members of the Secretariat of the Union of Soviet Writers spoke out against Sinyavsky and Daniel. As historian Fred Coleman writes, "Historians now have no difficulty pinpointing the birth of the modern Soviet dissident movement. It began in February 1966 with the trial of Andrei Sinyavsky and Yuli Daniel, two Russian writers who ridiculed the Communist regime in satires smuggled abroad and published under pen names... Little did they realize at the time that they were starting a movement that would help end Communist rule."

Sinyavsky was forced to work as a stevedore at the Dubravlag, a labor camp (katorga) of the Gulag system located near Yavas, Mordovian ASSR. Sinyavsky was released early in 1971 as part of an initiative by Yuri Andropov, the Chairman of the KGB and the future General Secretary of the CPSU.

== Later years and death ==
In 1973, Sinyavsky was allowed to emigrate to France at the invitation of Claude Frioux, a professor at the University of Paris 8 Vincennes-Saint-Denis specializing in Russia. Sinyavsky became a professor of Russian literature at Sorbonne University, co-founded the Russian-language almanac Sintaksis with his wife Maria Rozanova, and actively contributed to Radio Liberty. Sinyavsky and Rozanova's son, Iegor Gran, graduated from École Centrale Paris and became a novelist.

On 17 October 1991, Sinyavsky was featured in a report received by Izvestia on the review of convictions for several prominent Soviet individuals due to lack of corpus delicti in their actions. Sinyavsky, Yuli Daniel, Kārlis Ulmanis, Nikolay Timofeev-Ressovsky were considered for "rehabilitation" only two months before the dissolution of the Soviet Union.

In early 1996, Sinyavsky suffered a heart attack, and later that year was diagnosed with lung cancer with metastases in the brain. Sinyavsky underwent unsuccessful operations and radiotherapy at the Curie Institute. Sinyavsky died in 1997 in Fontenay-aux-Roses, near Paris, and was buried there by the Russian Orthodox priest and writer Vladimir Vigilyansky with Andrei Voznesensky in attendance.

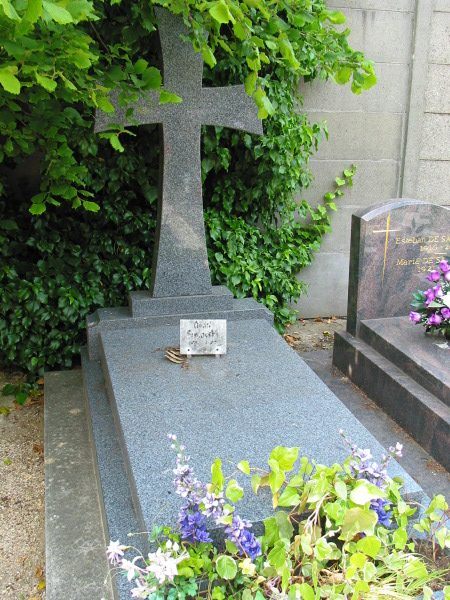
Andrei Sinyavsky's grave (Cimetière communal de Fontenay-aux-Roses, Rue des Pierrelais 18)

Sinyavsky was the catalyst for the formation of the Russian-English translation team of Larissa Volokhonsky and Richard Pevear, who have translated a number of works by Mikhail Bulgakov, Anton Chekhov, Fyodor Dostoyevski, Nikolai Gogol, and Leo Tolstoy. Volokhonsky, who was born and raised in Leningrad (now St. Petersburg), first visited the United States in the early 1970s and happened across Pevear's Hudson Review article about Sinyavsky. At the time, Pevear believed Sinyavsky was still in a Russian prison; Volokhonsky had just helped him immigrate to Paris. Pevear was surprised and pleased to be mistaken: "Larissa had just helped Sinyavsky leave Russia," Pevear recalled. "And she let me know that, while I'd said he was still in prison, he was actually in Paris. I was glad to know it."

== Bibliography ==
Books

- On Socialist Realism (1959) criticised the poor quality of the drearily positive-toned, conflict-free structures in the style of the state-backed socialist realism, and called for a return to the fantastic in Soviet literature, the tradition, Sinyavsky said, of Gogol and Vladimir Mayakovsky. This work also drew connections between socialist realism and classicism. It asserted that greater similarities exist between Soviet literature and that predating the 19th century than exist between Soviet (socialist realist) literature and the intellectual skepticism plaguing the protagonists of 19th-century Russian novels.
- The Trial Begins (1960) is a short novel with characters reacting in different ways to their roles in a totalitarian society, told with elements of the fantastic.
- The Makepeace Experiment (1963) is an allegorical novel of Russia where a leader uses non-rational powers to rule.
- Fantastic Stories (1963) is a collection of short stories, such as "The Icicle". The stories are mostly culled from the 1950s and 1960s and are written in the fantastic tradition of Gogol, E. T. A. Hoffmann, and Yevgeny Zamyatin.
- A Voice from the Chorus (1973) is a collection of scattered thoughts from the Gulag, composed in letters he wrote to his wife. It contains snippets of literary thoughts as well as the comments and conversations of fellow prisoners, most of them criminals or even German war prisoners.
- Goodnight! (1984) is an autobiographical novel.
- Soviet Civilization: A Cultural History (1990).
- Кошкин дом. Роман дальнего следования (1998).
- Strolls with Pushkin (1968) (Columbia University Press, The Russian Library, 2016) (translated by Catherine Theimer Nepomnyashchy and Slava I. Yastremski).
- In Gogol's Shadow (Columbia University Press, The Russian Library, 2021) (translated by Josh Billings)

Articles

- Sinyavsky, Andrei; Tikos, Laszlo; Ellert, Frederick (Summer 1966). "On Robert Frost's poems". The Massachusetts Review. 7 (3): 431–441. JSTOR 25087444.
- Sinyavsky, Andrei (1969). "Boris Pasternak (1965)". In Davie, Donald; Livigstone, Angela (eds.). Pasternak. Macmillan. pp. 154–219. doi:10.1007/978-1-349-15303-9_10. ISBN 978-0312032258.
- Sinyavsky, Andrei (May 1974). "Father Boris Zalivako". Religion in Communist Lands. 2 (3): 16–17. doi:10.1080/09637497408430673.
- Sinyavsky, Andrei (15 April 1976). "The Jews and the Devil". The New York Review of Books. 23 (6).
- Sinyavsky, Andrei (September 1978). "Emigré". Encounter. 51 (3): 79–80.
- Sinyavsky, Andrei (April 1979). "Andrei Sinyavsky on dissidence". Encounter. 52 (4): 91–93.
- Sinyavsky, Andrei; Andreyev Carlisle, Olga (22 November 1979). "Solzhenitsyn and Russian nationalism: an interview with Andrei Sinyavsky". The New York Review of Books. 26 (18).
- Sinyavsky, Andrei (August 1980). "Samizdat and the rebirth of literature". Index on Censorship. 9 (4): 8–13. doi:10.1080/03064228008533086. S2CID 144564086.
- Aksenov, Vasily; Etkind, Efim; Grigorenko, Pyotr; Grigorenko, Zinaida; Kopelev, Lev; Litvinov, Pavel; Litvinov, Maya; Mihajlov, Mihajlo; Proffer, Carl; Proffer, Ellendea; Synyavsky, Andrey; Shraginet, Boris; et al. (4 February 1982). "Help the Poles". The New York Review of Books. 29 (1).
- Sinyavsky, Andrei (Spring 1984). "Dissent as a personal experience". Dissent. 31 (2): 152–161.
- Sinyavsky, Andrei (June 1986). "My life as a writer". Index on Censorship. 15 (6): 7–14. doi:10.1080/03064228608534110.
- Sinyavsky, Andrei (May 1988). "The space of prose". Index on Censorship. 17 (5): 20–36. doi:10.1080/03064228808534414. S2CID 145113890.
- Sinyavsky, Andrei (10 April 1989). "Would I move back?". Time. No. 15. pp. 75–77.
- Sinyavsky, Andrei (November 1989). "A trip to Moscow". Index on Censorship. 18 (10): 7–10. doi:10.1080/03064228908534730. S2CID 142996985.
- Sinyavsky, Andrei; Peterson, Dale (Winter 1990). "Russian nationalism". The Massachusetts Review. 31 (4): 475–494. JSTOR 25090205.
- Sinyavsky, Andrei (1990). "Rozanov". In Freeborn, Richard; Grayson, Jane (eds.). Ideology in Russian literature. Macmillan. pp. 116–133. doi:10.1007/978-1-349-10825-1_6. ISBN 978-0312032258.
- Костырко, С. (2005). Переписка Андрея Синявского с редакцией серии "Библиотека поэта": изменение советского литературного поля [Andrei Sinyavsky's correspondence to the editors of "Poet's Library" series: the change of the Soviet literary field]. Новое литературное обозрение (in Russian) (71).
