= Ipso Facto (disambiguation) =

Ipso facto is a Latinism used in law, philosophy and science.

Ipso Facto may also refer to:

== Music groups ==
- Ipso Facto (band), English band (2007–2009)
- Viva Machine (formerly Ipsofacto), a Welsh rock band (2003–2009)

== Musical works ==
- Ipso Facto (album), a 1992 album by Canadian Rik Emmett
- Ipso Facto, a 1992 album by Frenchman Bruno Grimaldi
- "Ipso Facto", the John Hall Band's 1983 song

== Literature ==
- Iegor Gran § Bibliography
