= Dubravlag =

Soviet labor camp

The Dubravny Camp, Special Camp No.3 (Дубравный лагерь, Особый лагерь № 3), commonly known as the Dubravlag (Russian: Дубравлаг), was a Gulag labor camp of the Soviet Union located in Yavas, Mordovia from 1948 to 2005.

The Dubravlag was founded as one of several Gulag special camps in the Mordovian ASSR for political prisoners with a large population of Soviet dissidents. The Dubravlag became a corrective labor camp (ITL) in 1954 and part of the regular Soviet penitentiary system after the Gulag system was dissolved in 1960. The Dubravlag was operated by Russia after the dissolution of the Soviet Union in 1991 until it was converted into a prison of the Federal Penitentiary Service in 2005.

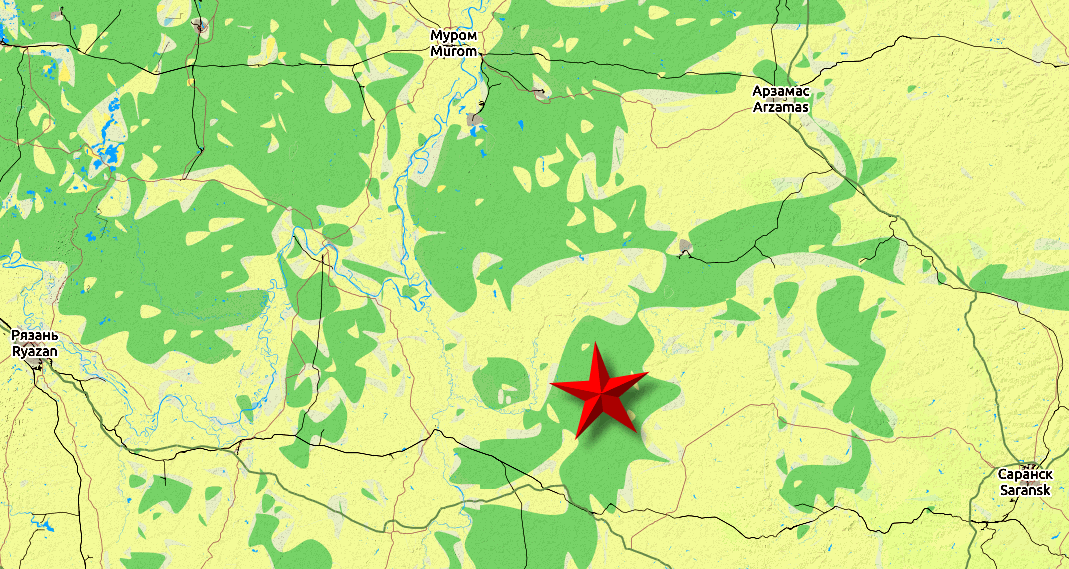
Dubravlag location

== History ==
The Dubravlag was established on 28 February 1948 as Gulag special camp No. 3 for political prisoners by merging the Temlag camp and Temnikovsky children's colony, a camp complex of the Soviet Gulag system of forced labor camps. Yavas was founded in 1931 as the headquarters of the Temlag, which was named after the pre-existing nearby town of Temnikov. The Temlag's camp section in Yavas was separated from its industrial operations and incorporated into the new special camp named Dubravny, meaning "oak grove" in Russian. The Soviets established a number of camps in the Mordovian ASSR to hold individuals convicted of "particularly dangerous state crimes" specifically. The Dubravlag became a common destination for writers arrested for Soviet dissident activity at a time of extreme censorship in the Soviet Union during the late Stalin era.

In 1954, after the death of Joseph Stalin, the Dubravlag and many other camps of the Gulag system were converted into regular corrective labor camp (ITL). In 1960, the Soviet government dissolved the Gulag agency and Dubravlag was incorporated into the Soviet penitentiary system. By 1961, the Mordovia camps including the Dubravlag became the sole destination of those convicted of political crimes in the Soviet Union, and continued to function as a penal labor camp during the Khrushchev Thaw. However, the rise of Leonid Brezhnev in 1964 led to an increase in political repression in the Soviet Union and a resurgence in the number of political prisoners. Brezhnev's rule began with the Sinyavsky–Daniel trial, where the writers Andrei Sinyavsky and Yuli Daniel were convicted of "Anti-Soviet agitation" in a show trial for their writings. In 1966, Sinyavsky and Daniel were both imprisoned at the Dubravlag until their early release in 1971 by Yuri Andropov, the Chairman of the KGB at the time.

After the dissolution of the Soviet Union in December 1991, the Dubravlag was inherited by Russia, which maintained many of the penal labor camps in Zubovo-Polyansky District. In 2005, the Dubravlag camp was dissolved and the site has been converted into a prison operated by the Republic of Mordovia branch of the Federal Penitentiary Service.

== Notable inmates ==
=== English language articles ===
- Viacheslav Chornovil, Ukrainian politician and dissident
- Metropolitan Cornelius (Jakobs), the Metropolitan bishop of Tallinn and All Estonia, head of the Estonian Orthodox Church of Moscow Patriarchate
- Yuli Daniel, Russian writer and dissident, defendant at the Sinyavsky–Daniel trial
- Yuri Galanskov, Russian poet, historian, human rights activist, and dissident, defendant at the Trial of the Four
- Nina Gagen-Torn, Russian poet, writer, historian and ethnographer
- Ivan Gel, Ukrainian politician and dissident
- Alexander Ginzburg, Russian writer and dissident, defendant at the Trial of the Four
- Olga Ivinskaya, friend and lover of Boris Pasternak
- Halyna Kuzmenko, Ukrainian teacher and anarchist revolutionary, wife of Nestor Makhno
- Vladimir Osipov, Russian dissident and writer of samizdat
- Lagle Parek, Estonian stateswoman
- Irina Ratushinskaya, Russian dissident, writer, and poet, described her years in Dubravlag in her book Grey Is the Color of Hope (1989, Vintage. ISBN 0-679-72447-8)
- Josyf Slipyj, Ukrainian Major Archbishop of the Ukrainian Greek Catholic Church
- Andrei Sinyavsky, Russian writer and dissident, defendant at the Sinyavsky–Daniel trial
- Leonid Solovyov, writer and playwright, wrote The Enchanted Prince, the second of his two novels about Nasreddin, at Dubravlag
- Tatyana Velikanova, Soviet mathematician and dissident
- Stanislovas Žvirgždas, imprisoned while being a student; later became a Lithuanian photographer and historian of photography

=== Russian language articles ===
- ru:Браун, Николай Николаевич (Nikolay Nikolaevich Braun), poet, translator and publicist, leading figure of the monarchist and Cossack movements.
- ru:Валентин Зэка (Zeka Balentin), Russian poet and dissident
- ru:Гидони, Александр Григорьевич (Aleksandr Grigorevich Gidoni), Russian dissident
- ru:Грицяк, Евгений Степанович
- ru:Кузнецов, Владимир Петрович (лингвист) (Vladimir Petrovich Kuznetsov), Russian researcher, journalist, and dissident
- ru:Кривошеин, Игорь Александрович (Igor Aleksandrovich Krivoshein), Russian French Resistance fighter and Soviet patriot, son of Alexander Krivoshein
- ru:Найденович, Адель Петровна (Adel Petrovna Naydenovich), Russian dissident and wife of Vladimir Osipov
- ru:Могилевер, Хаим Зеэв (Chaim Ze'ev Mogilever), co-founder of the Zionist movement in the Soviet Union
- ru:Молоствов, Михаил Михайлович (Mikhail Mikhailovich Molostvov), Russian human rights activist and politician, member of the State Duma of Russia from 1993 to 1995.
- ru:Подольский, Барух (Barukh Podolsky), Israeli linguist and lexicographer
- ru:Романов, Александр Иванович (Aleksandr Ivanovich Romanov), Russian dissident and opponent of authoritarianism
- ru:Сорока, Михайло Михайлович (Mikhailo Mikhailovich Soroka), Ukrainian nationalist and dissident, died at the Dubravlag
- ru:Чешков, Марат Александрович (Marat Aleksandrovich Cheshkov), Russian historian and political scientist, husband of Engelsina Markizova

== See also ==
- List of Gulag camps
- Category:Dubravlag detainees
