= Seyfaddin Daghli =

Azerbaijani writer

Seyfaddin Daghli Seyfəddin Dağlı
- Born: August 27, 1921; Khizi, Kuba uezd, Azerbaijan SSR
- Died: January 18, 1983 (aged 61); Baku, Azerbaijan SSR, USSR
- Occupation: writer

Seyfaddin Aliagha oghlu Abbasov (Azerbaijani: Seyfəddin Əliağa oğlu Abbasov, August 27, 1921 – January 18, 1983) was an Azerbaijani writer, poet, playwright, journalist.

== Biography ==
Seyfaddin Daghli was born on August 27, 1921, in Khizi. He served in the military from 1941 to 1956. During that time, he worked as a literary worker in "Ordu" newspaper and as an editor in "Diviziya" newspaper. In 1956–1959, Dagli worked as the editor-in-chief of the State Radio Committee, and later as the director and deputy chairman of the "Baku" television studio.

For a long time, Seyfeddin Dagli worked as the editor-in-chief of Kirpi magazine, a member of the script editorial board at the film studio Azerbaijanfilm, and as an editor at "Yazichi" publishing house. In 1948 his first book, Dəniz kəşfiyyatçısı (Sea Explorer) was published. His plays have been staged many times at the Azerbaijan State Academic National Drama Theatre, the Azerbaijan State Academic Theatre of Musical Comedy, and the Azerbaijan State Theatre of Young Spectators.

The novel "Bahar oglu", dedicated to the life and creativity of the great Azerbaijani playwright Jafar Jabbarly, brought great fame to the writer. In 1953, the writer married Gulara Jabbarly, daughter of J. Jabbarly, and they had three children.

On August 26, 1981, Daghli was awarded the honorary decree of the Presidium of the Supreme Soviet of the Azerbaijan SSR.

Seyfaddin Dagli died on January 18, 1983, in Baku.
