= Michael Daniel =

Michael Daniel may refer to:

- Michael Daniel (tennis) (born 1965), Israeli tennis player
- Michael Daniel (linguist) (born 1972), Russian linguist
- Michael R. Daniel (born 1940), lieutenant governor of South Carolina, US
- Mikey Daniel (born 1996), American football running back

== See also ==
- Michael Daniels (born 1950), British transpersonal psychologist and parapsychologist
- Michael Daniell (born 1956/57), New Zealand electrical engineer and businessman
