= Marina Ryndzyunskaya =

Russian sculptor (1877–1946)

- Марина Давыдовна Рындзюнская
- Born: 1877; Petrozavodsk, Karelia
- Died: 1946 (aged 68–69)
- Known for: Sculptor

Marina Davydovna Ryndzyunskaya (Russian: Марина Давыдовна Рындзюнская; 1877–1946) was a Russian, later Soviet sculptor.

== Biography ==
Ryndzyunskaya was born in Petrozavodsk, Karelia, later moving to Astrakhan with her family. She was a member of the Society of Russian Sculptors beginning in 1926, and the organization held meetings in her studio. In 1927 she participated in an exhibition in Moscow to mark the tenth anniversary of the October Revolution, and in 1932 she showed her work at the Venice Biennale. Several of her sculptures are in the collection of the Tretyakov Gallery, including a statue of Mamlakat Nakhangova. Her style has been described as reminiscent of the work of Auguste Rodin and Antoine Bourdelle. At her death Ryndzyunskaya bequeathed many of her works to her native city.
