= Ogtay Sadigzade =

Soviet and Azerbaijani visual artist

Ogtay Sadigzade Oqtay Sadıqzadə
- Born: Ogtay Seyid Huseyn oghlu Sadigzade; 24 February 1921; Khizi, Kuba uezd, Azerbaijan SSR
- Died: 20 December 2014 (aged 93); Baku, Azerbaijan
- Education: Moscow Surikov State Academic Institute of Fine Arts
- Occupation: painter
- Spouse: Elmira Shahtakhtinskaya
- Children: Altay Sadigzade
- Parent(s): Seyid Huseyn Sadig; Ümmügülsüm
- Awards

Ogtay Seyid Huseyn oghlu Sadigzade (Azerbaijani: Oqtay Seyid Hüseyn oğlu Sadıqzadə, 24 February 1921 – 20 December 2014) was a Soviet and Azerbaijani visual artist. He was awarded the title People's Artist of the Republic of Azerbaijan (1992), laureate of the State Prize of the Republic of Azerbaijan (2014), Personal pensioner of the President of the Republic of Azerbaijan (2002).

== Biography ==
Ogtay Sadigzade was born on February 21, 1921, in Khizi. From 1935 to 1939, he studied at the Baku Art Technical College and attracted the attention of art critics with his early works.

In 1941, as a member of a repressed family, Ogtay Sadigzade was exiled because his father Seyid Husein (1887-1938) was accused of being "An Enemy of the People". Stalin's agents also arrested his mother Ummugulsum and sentenced her to eight years in the GULAG alongside his younger brother Jighatay, who died in the GULAG.

Ogtay survived the GULAG even under extremely difficult conditions of hunger and extreme climatic conditions, ⁣ and in time was able to use his artistic ability even in the GULAG camps. Upon release, he continued his creativity.

After returning to Baku from the GULAG in 1946, he began to engage in book graphics and achieved success in this field. To continue his education, he entered the Moscow Surikov State Academic Institute of Fine Arts and graduated in 1956 with a degree in graphics.

The works of the artist were given a special place in the design of the Nizami Museum of Azerbaijani Literature, the National Museum of History of Azerbaijan, the house museums of Uzeyir Hajibeyli, Huseyn Javid, Samad Vurgun and Bulbul.

The artist's works are exhibited in the National Art Museum of Azerbaijan, as well as in the Tretyakov Gallery, and are kept in private collections in the United States, Germany, Canada, Israel, and other countries.

Ogtay Sadigzade died on 20 December 2014 in Baku.

== Awards ==
- Medal "For Distinguished Labour" — 9 June 1959
- Honored Art Worker of the Azerbaijan SSR — 5 December 1977
- People's Artist of Azerbaijan — 4 March 1992
- Shohrat Order — 27 February 1999
- Personal pension of the President of the Republic of Azerbaijan — June 11, 2002
- Sharaf Order — February 24, 2011
- State Award of the Republic of Azerbaijan — May 26, 2014

== Links ==
Targeting the Arts: Ogtay Sadigzade—Son of an "Enemy of the People" In AZER.com, Azerbaijan International, Vol. 14:1 (Spring 2006), pp. 34-39.

Heartache of Separation: “Too Many Springs, Too Many Winters” Letters from the GULAG between Ummugulsum Sadigzade and her children Ogtay, Jighatay, Toghrul and Gumral in AZER.com, Azerbaijan International, Vol. 14:1 (Spring 2006) pp. 48-53.
