= Ümmügülsüm (name) =

Ümmügülsüm is a feminine given name. It may refer to:

- Ümmügülsüm (1899–1944), Azerbaijani poet

of* Ümmügülsüm Bedel (born 1995), Turkish handballer

- Ümmügülsüm Sultan (daughter of Ahmed III) (1708–1732), daughter of Ottoman SultanAhmed III
- Ümmugülsüm Sultan (daughter of Mehmed IV) (1677–1720), daughter
- Umm Kulthum (1904–1975), Egyptian singer and film actress
- Umme Kulsum Smrity (born 1963), Bangladesh politician
