= Ümmügülsüm =

Azerbaijani poet

- Ümmügülsüm
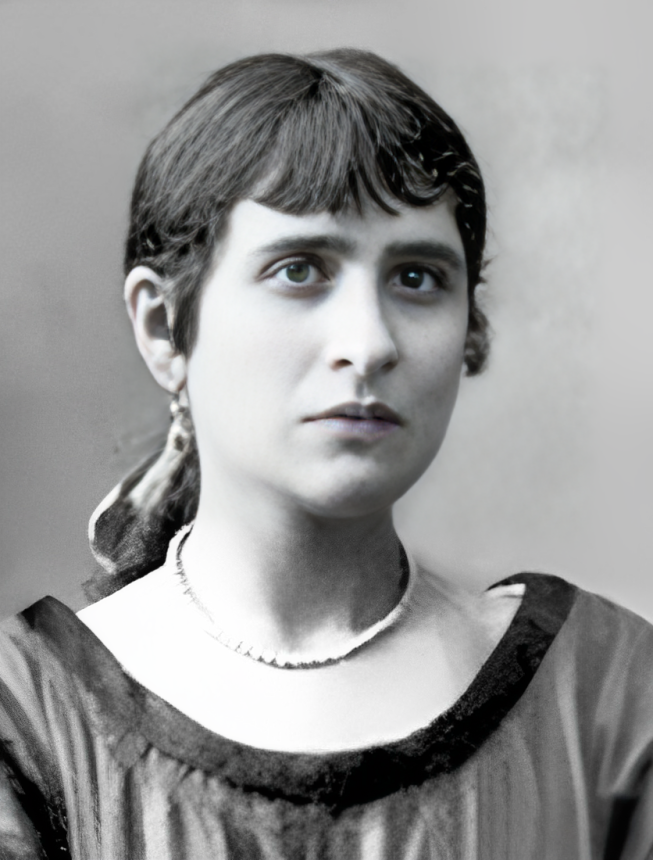
- Born: 1899; Novxanı, Baku uezd, Baku Governorate, Russian Empire
- Died: 1944 (aged 44–45); Shamakhi, Azerbaijan Soviet Socialist Republic, Soviet Union
- Resting place: Shakhandan
- Occupations: poet, writer
- Children: Ogtay Sadigzade et al.

Ümmügülsüm (1899, Novkhani, Baku district – 1944, Shamakhi) was an Azerbaijani poet.

She was the sister of Mahammadali Rasulzade, one of the founders of the Musavat Party, and the cousin and sister-in-law of Mahammad Amin Rasulzade, who served as the head of the Musavat Party and the National Council of the Azerbaijan Democratic Republic.

== Life ==
Ümmügülsüm Abdulaziz's daughter, born in 1899 in the village of Novkhani into a religious family, learned Arabic and Persian languages from her father at home.

She began writing poetry in 1908. Her poems and stories were published in newspapers and journals such as "Iqbal", "Yeni Iqbal", "Açıq söz", "Qurtuluş", "Dirilik", "Məktəb", "Qardaş köməyi", "Azərbaycan", and others. In 1914, her stories started being published in the press, and in 1915, her story "Solğun çiçək" received an award in a competition announced by the "Qurtuluş" journal.

During the years 1918–1920, in relation to the establishment of the Azerbaijan Democratic Republic, she wrote poems such as "Türk ordusuna", "Ey türk oğlu!", "Çəkil, dəf ol!", "Əsgər anasına", "Dərdli nəğmə", "Yurdumuzun qəhrəmanlığına", "Yollarını bəklədim". After the April occupation, she wrote poems "Hicran" and "Bayrağım enərkən". The poem "Bayrağım enərkən" was written in relation to the removal of the Azerbaijani flag from the parliament building on May 3, 1920. These poems were widely circulated among Azerbaijani political emigrants in Turkey during the 1920s and 1930s. After the occupation, she moved with her family to Khizi.

In 1937, when her husband, Seyid Hüsein was arrested, Ümmügülsüm was also imprisoned as the wife of an "enemy of the people". Her residence was searched, and her property was confiscated. Her writings were banned during her imprisonment. While in Bayil prison, she wrote a memoir titled "Qala xatirələrim". After being detained for several months in Bayil prison, she was sentenced to 8 years in prison and sent to the Temlag labor camp in the Mordovian Autonomous Soviet Socialist Republic.

In 1943, Ümmügülsüm applied to the People's Commissariat for Internal Affairs of the USSR, requesting her release. She was released from prison in April 1944. After living in Baku for a few days, she was not allowed to reside in the city, so she moved to Shamakhi. She lived in Shamakhi for a few months and died in September 1944 at the age of 45. She was buried in the Shakhendan cemetery.

== Family ==
She was the sister of Mahammadali Rasulzade, one of the founders of the Musavat Party, and the cousin and sister-in-law of Mahammad Amin Rasulzade, who served as the head of the Musavat Party and the National Council of the Azerbaijan Democratic Republic.

In 1916, she met the writer Seyid Hüseyin during the first performance of Jalil Mammadguluzadeh's play "Ölülər" at the Tagiyev's Theater. They later married in 1920.

From this marriage, she had one daughter, Gumral Sadigzade, who became a writer, and three sons, Ogtay and Toghrul, who became painters, and the youngest son, Chıghatay, served in the engineering battalion but succumbed to a severe form of tuberculosis due to his work in harsh conditions. He died at the age of 24. Ogtay Sadigzade is recognized as the People's Painter of the Republic of Azerbaijan.

== Memory ==
Her daughter, Gumral Sadigzade, dedicated a significant portion of her novel "Son mənzili Xəzər oldu" to Ümmügülsüm in the second part of the book.

On December 18, 2022, an exhibition titled "Çəmən ayrısı" was opened at the "Baku" Art Gallery dedicated to the memory of Ümmügülsüm Sadigzade.

== Links ==
Heartache of Separation: “Too Many Springs, Too Many Winters” Letters from the GULAG between Ummugulsum and her children Ogtay, Jighatay, Toghrul and Gumral in AZER.com, Azerbaijan International, Vol. 14:1 (Spring 2006), pp. 48-53.

Bayil Prison: Our Eyes Full of Tears: Our Hearts Broken. The Poetry of Ummugulsum Sadigzade in AZER.com, Azerbaijan International, Vol. 14:1 (Spring 2006), pp. 46-47.

Prison Diary: Tears Are My Only Companions by Ummugulsum Sadigzade, wife of Seyid Husein in AZER.com, Azerbaijan International, Vol. 14:1 (Spring 2006), pp. 40-45.

Targeting the Arts: Ogtay Sadigzade—Son of an "Enemy of the People" in AZER.com, Azerbaijan International, Vol. 14:1 (Spring 2006), pp. 34-39.
