= Tregubov =

Tregubov (Russian: Трегу́бов) is a Russian masculine surname, its feminine counterpart is Tregubova. It may refer to:

- Aleksey Tregubov (born 1971), Belarusian cross-country skier
- Ivan Tregubov (1930–1992), Russian ice hockey defenceman
- Maria Tregubova (born 1984), Moldovan swimmer
- Nikita Tregubov (born 1995), Russian skeleton racer
- Pavel Tregubov (born 1971), Russian chess grandmaster
- Viktor Tregubov (born 1965), Russian weightlifter
- Vitali Tregubov (born 1974), Kazakhstani ice hockey defenceman
- Yelena Tregubova (born 1973), Russian journalist
- Yuri Tregubov (1913–2000), Russian writer
