= Pietro Leoni =

Italian jesuit

- Born: 1 January 1909; Forlì, Italy
- Died: 26 July 1995 (aged 86); Montreal, Canada

Pietro Leoni (1 January 1909 – 26 July 1995) was an Italian priest of the Society of Jesus and the Russian Greek Catholic Church. His memoir of surviving the Gulag, "Spia del Vaticano!", was published after his return to the West.

== Early life ==
He was born to peasant parents in Montaltovecchio, near Forlì, Emilia-Romagna, Kingdom of Italy. In 1922, he entered the minor seminary at Modigliana.

In 1927, Leonid joined the Society of Jesus, which sent him to study at the Pontifical Gregorian University in Rome. He arrived at the Russicum, a Jesuit-run seminary established to train priests of the Russian Greek Catholic Church for missionary work in the Soviet Union and the Russian diaspora, in 1934. After briefly teaching there as an in residence philosophy tutor, Leoni applied to permanently join the Russian Apostolate and was ordained in 1939 as a priest of the Byzantine Rite.

== Military chaplain and missionary ==
In 1940, Fr. Leoni was drafted into the Italian Royal Army and served as a military chaplain in Albania and occupied Greece. In 1941, Fr. Leoni's unit was assigned to Dnipropetrovsk, as part of Operation Barbarossa.

Before his departure for the USSR in October 1941, Fr. Leoni was granted an audience with Metropolitan Andrey Sheptytsky of the Ukrainian Greek Catholic Church. He later recalled, "I told Szeptycki about the condition of the Catholic and Orthodox religions in the Ukraine and about the attitude of the German authorities to the clergy. I reported that under the Germans the Catholic Church was unable to function, that the Orthodox clergy enjoyed the trust of the Germans, and that the number of Orthodox priests was increasing under the German occupation."

In 1943 he was released from military service as the Italian army disintegrated and he decided to stay on as a missionary priest in Romanian-occupied Odessa.

When the Red Army reoccupied the city on 10 April 1944, Fr. Leoni was at first allowed, despite the stiff opposition of the Moscow Patriarchate's Eparchy of Odessa, to remain in the city and continue to minister to local Catholics. Despite this, NKVD surveillance of Fr. Leoni and his parishioners began almost immediately.

Even though Soviet anti-religious legislation strictly forbade the registration of foreign priests and even though the NKVD already had a file on him, Fr. Leoni was allowed to register as the pastor of the Catholics of Odessa in November 1944. His congregation numbered about 8,000 people, most of whom were ethnic Poles. Despite this, Fr. Leoni offered only the Byzantine Rite Divine Liturgy in Old Church Slavonic and preached in Russian.

Fr. Leoni later recalled following his arrest, however, "I am essentially a religious man. For me the Catholic Church comes before everything else and politics does not interest me. When I refused to conduct active propaganda among my parishioners [to get them] to participate and sign up for the State loan and the collection of funds for the defense of the U.S.S.R., I told officials from the district soviet that conducting such propaganda in the church was not our spiritual business. But I had no objection to my parishioners collecting money for the Red Cross, for the families of those at the Front or for war invalids... I believe that, on the one hand, the organs of Soviet power harass the clergy and religion in general, while, on the other hand, they use the Orthodox Church in the battle against other faiths."

Fr. Leoni also received several Orthodox Christians, including at least one priest, into the Russian Greek Catholic Church, for which he later accused local Russian Orthodox Bishop Sergei (Larin) of denouncing him to the NKVD.

== Political prisoner ==
On April 29, 1945, he was arrested by the NKVD and brought to the Lubyanka Prison in Moscow for interrogation. To the outrage of his interrogators, Fr. Leoni refused to answer questions that might harm the Church or other underground priests, such as his former classmate Walter Ciszek.

Fr. Leoni's, "sometimes flippant answers earned him spells in solitary confinement, but surprisingly he was not tortured, or at least he does not mention it."

While refusing to inform against his fellow Catholics, Fr. Leoni had no problem with telling his interrogators exactly what he thought of the Soviet Government. According to his case file, he once said, "Given that I am a Catholic religious, I was and am an enemy of Marxism and of the political regime which exists in the USSR - a regime, which, in my opinion is not different from Fascism... I believe that in the USSR there is neither democracy, not freedom for the people. The Soviet regime has stripped the people of freedom of religion, of freedom of the press, and of freedom of expression. One is forbidden to think freely, to develop one's initiative or creativity... I have never calumniated the Soviet Government: I have only said what I believe without mincing my words..."

When NKVD interrogators confronted him with "witnesses" who claimed that he was a supporter of Fascist dictators Adolf Hitler and Benito Mussolini, Fr. Leoni calmly replied, "I do not deny that I favored a change in the political system in the USSR but I never advocated the achievement of such change through an attack on the Soviet Union... I was not a supporter of the system established by Mussolini in Italy and I never told anyone that I shared Mussolini's political views... In Odessa, during the occupation, I helped several young people to avoid being deported to Germany by the Nazis."

On 13 September 1945, Fr. Leoni's interrogation ended and a formal indictment was approved. He was declared guilty of espionage on behalf of the Vatican, anti-Soviet agitation, and of trying to convert the Orthodox to the Eastern Catholic Churches. On November 12, 1945, an NKVD Collegium sentenced him to ten years in the Gulag.

Fr. Leoni later recalled of the transit prison in Kirov, "Bed-bugs and roaches multiplied by the millions and at night it was impossible to defend one's self against them because the room was in total darkness. Only when they brought supper did they bring us a miserable oil lamp which immediately they removed. They left us at the mercy of these parasites which in the darkness became even more insatiable and aggressive. The three nights I spent there were a real martyrdom. And even more suffering did I have to endure from human parasites."

Like many other political prisoners in the Gulag, the memoirs of Fr. Leoni also describe being preyed upon and robbed by the Vory v Zakone.

While serving his sentence at Temlag in the Mordovian ASSR, Fr. Leoni was again arrested on June 15, 1947, and accused of, "belonging to a counterrevolutionary organisation" of fellow political prisoners which interrogators dubbed "Volya" ("The Will"). According to investigators, "Volya" was planning a prisoner uprising, was smuggling letters to Western Governments, and also trying to tunnel out of the camp. Both Fr. Leoni's memoirs and the investigative file, however, reveal that "Volya" was created and organized by an NKVD agent provocateur named Goryachev.

Even so, on August 28–29, 1947, a special Temlag camp court declared Fr. Leoni guilty of violating article 58 of the Russian Criminal Code and another 25 years in Rechlag were added to his sentence.

On 9 April 1951, Father Leoni had an argument at Rechlag with KGB Captain G., who mockingly said, "God? But if your God really existed he would not allow you to be stuck here."

Leoni replied, "Why would he not permit it? Look, I have been found worthy to suffer for Him and I am sure that if I endure everything to the end He will grant me an eternal reward."

The Captain snapped, "A vain hope, since God does not exist."

Fr. Leoni replied, "God existed, God exists now, and will always exist. Soviet power, on the other hand..."

The enraged Captain shouted, "Soviet power existed, exists now, and..."

Fr. Leoni interrupted, "And will not exist in the future!" When the Captain told him that his interruption would cost him two months in the punishment barracks, Fr. Leoni responded, according to his prisoner file, "That will prove that you are parasites."

According to Memorial member and historian of Soviet religious persecution Irina Osipova, "Many of his 'outbursts' against the camp administration are not mentioned in his person dossier, but are described by his associates in their memoirs". For example, Yuri Tregubov, a fellow prisoner who was incarcerated with Fr. Leoni in Vorkuta, later recalled how a KGB Lieutenant-Colonel arrived in the camp during the summer of 1953 to deliver a lecture on "Soviet humanism". The Lieut.-Col. began by saying, "Soviet power not only chastises you, it also forgives you... Millions have been released, and that's only a small percentage of those who will be freed."

At first a fellow prisoner sarcastically heckled the visitor, saying, "Citizen Commandant, you said that the Soviet authorities have already freed millions and that's only a small percentage of those who will be released. If millions are a small percentage, how many are in the camps? Half the country?" The assembled zeks burst into laughter and another prisoner mockingly called out, "Forty million for sure. That really is humanism." Then "Per Leoni", as his fellow zeks called him, stood up and shouted in flawless Russian, "Don't believe the Chekist liars! Don't believe this godless regime! The Chekists are leading you astray, fight them!"

For a brief moment, chaos reigned and the guards were only able with difficulty to restore order, after which, "humanism notwithstanding", Fr. Pietro Leoni was sent to a punishment cell.

Fellow political prisoner Jan Urwich later wrote about how, in 1955, a delegation from Moscow arrived at the labor camp to collect signatures for the Stockholm Appeal, in which the Cominform-controlled World Peace Council had called for a global ban on nuclear weapons. A lecturer first made a speech calling for signatures and the KGB officer chairing the meeting urged any prisoner who wished to speak in favor of the appeal to do so. Urwich later recalled, "From the back of the hall came a voice speaking in Russian with an Italian accent, 'Whoever signs the Stockholm Appeal signs his own death warrant! Better a cruel death under the atomic bomb than living on in this happy paradise where we find ourselves now!' The hall literally erupted. The resulting noise and chaos could not be quelled and the meeting disintegrated. Everything went to pieces."

On 25 April 1955, a Collegium of the Supreme Court of the Soviet Union commuted Fr. Leoni's sentence to seven years imprisonment. As he had already more than served his new sentence, he was told that would be released and allowed to return to his native Italy.

Jan Urwich later recalled, "The news of Fr. Leoni's departure for Rome, at a time when no one expected it, planted much hope and joy... This man made us feel confident that he would tell that Free World, to which he was returning, the tragic and incredible truth about the country the champions of Humanism and the brotherhood of peoples."

On 17 May 1955, Fr. Leoni was handed over to representatives of the Italian Government in Vienna, through the intervention of the Vatican.

== Later life ==
Following his return to Italy, Fr. Leoni lived for a time at the Russicum, but, according to Fr. Constantin Simon, "even extreme resilience has its limits." Severely traumatized by his experiences in the Gulag, Fr. Leoni distrusted Russicum students who had lived in Soviet Russia and suspected them of being assassins for the KGB. Fr. Leoni also sharply opposed the efforts by the Russicum's then Rector, Fr. Bohumíl-Feofil Horáček, S.J., to rehabilitate the Moscow Patriarchate in the eyes of Catholics in the West. Fr. Leoni, who believed the Moscow Patriarchate to be "a mere instrument of the Atheist State", openly heckled Fr. Horáček whenever he spoke of these views publicly and also gave media interviews expounding his own views.

In response, the Society of Jesus transferred Fr. Leoni to write his memoir "Spia del Vaticano!" at the Jesuit houses in Florence and Cesena. After his memoir was published in 1959, Fr. Leoni, who wished to work as a missionary in the Russian diaspora, was assigned to Canada.

Fr. Leoni served as pastor of the Russian Catholic parish of the Presentation of Our Lady in Jerusalem in Montreal, where he also worked at the Catholic hospital dedicated to St. Frances Cabrini.

On 3 November 1974, Fr. Leoni responded to recent efforts since the Quiet Revolution by feminists to pass legislation aimed against workers at Catholic hospitals by giving an interview over Canadian radio, "in which he clearly and unambiguously defended", the teachings of the Roman Catholic Church on human sexuality.

== Death and legacy ==
Fr. Pietro Leoni died of a heart attack while swimming in a Canadian lake on July 26, 1995. He was 86 years old.

Following his death, the Russian Catholic parish of the Presentation of the Blessed Virgin in Jerusalem was closed down permanently by Fr. Leoni's Ecclesiastical superiors in the Roman Catholic Archdiocese of Montreal. The church building has since been given to the Chaldean Catholic Eparchy of Mar Addai of Toronto and is currently in use as Sts. Martyrs of the East Chaldean Catholic Church.

Since the collapse of the Soviet Union, Fr. Leoni's memoir of the Gulag, "Spia del Vaticano!", has been translated from Italian to Russian and published. It has yet to the translated, however, into English.

== See also ==
- Anti-Catholicism in the Soviet Union
