= Yuli Daniel =

Soviet Russian writer, translator and dissident

Yuli Markovich Daniel
- Юлий Маркович Даниэль
- The bookcover of The Letters from Prison
- Born: November 15, 1925; Moscow, Russian SFSR, Soviet Union
- Died: December 30, 1988 (aged 63); Moscow, Russian SFSR, Soviet Union
- Spouse(s): Larisa Bogoraz, Irina Uvarova
- Children: 1
- Writing career
- Pen name: Nikolay Arzhak, Yu. Petrov

Yuli Markovich Daniel (Russian: Ю́лий Ма́ркович Даниэ́ль, IPA: [ˈjʉlʲɪj ˈmarkəvʲɪtɕ dənʲɪˈelʲ]; 15 November 1925 – 30 December 1988) was a Russian writer and Soviet dissident known as a defendant in the Sinyavsky–Daniel trial in 1966.

Daniel wrote and translated works of stories and poetry critical of Soviet society under the pseudonyms Nikolay Arzhak (Russian: Никола́й Аржа́к, IPA: [nʲɪkɐˈlaj ɐrˈʐak]) and Yu. Petrov (Russian: Ю. Петро́в, IPA: [ˈju pʲɪˈtrof]) published in the West to avoid censorship in the Soviet Union. Daniel and Andrei Sinyavsky were convicted of anti-Soviet agitation in a show trial, becoming the first Soviet writers convicted solely for their works and for fiction, serving five years at a labour camp.

== Early life and writing ==
Yuli Daniel was born on 15 November 1925 in Moscow, Soviet Union, the son of the Russian Jewish playwright Mark Daniel and Minna Pavlovna Daniel. In 1942, the 17-year-old Daniel lied about his age and volunteered to serve on the 2nd Ukrainian Front and the 3rd Belorussian Front during Eastern Front of World War II. In 1944, Daniel was critically wounded in his legs and was demobilized from the Red Army. In 1950, Daniel graduated from the Moscow Pedagogical Institute (now Moscow State Regional University), and went to work as a schoolteacher in Kaluga and Moscow.

Daniel also published translations of verse from a variety of languages, and like his friend Andrei Sinyavsky, wrote topical stories and novellas which sometimes satirised or were critical of Soviet society but were, naturally, rejected for publication by the Communist Party of the Soviet Union (CPSU) during a time of extreme censorship in the Soviet Union. Daniel and Sinyavsky smuggled their works out of the Soviet Union as samizdat to France to be published under pseudonyms. Daniel married Larisa Bogoraz, who later also became a celebrated Soviet dissident.

== Sinyavsky-Daniel trial ==
Daniel's work Moscow Speaking, published in 1959 under the pseudonym Nikolai Arzhak, caught the attention of the KGB, the main security agency and secret police of the Soviet Union. The KGB began investigating Daniel and Sinyavsky's dissident works being published in the West, and soon linked their pseudonyms to their real identities. Daniel and Sinyavsky were placed under constant surveillance and investigation by the KGB for several years.

In September 1965, Daniel and Sinyavsky were arrested and tried in the infamous Sinyavsky-Daniel trial for their literary works published abroad. The Soviet prosecution could not charge Daniel and Sinyavsky for publishing material abroad or using pseudonyms as both were legal under Soviet Law. Instead they were charged with the offense of anti-Soviet agitation and propaganda under Article 70 of the RSFSR Criminal Code. Both writers entered a plea of not guilty, which was unusual for defendants in Soviet show trials. On 14 February 1966, Daniel was sentenced to five years of hard labor for "anti-Soviet activity" while Sinyavsky was sentenced to seven years.

In 1967, Andrei Sakharov appealed on behalf of Daniel directly to Yuri Andropov, the then Chairman of the KGB. Sakharov was told that both Daniel and Sinyavsky would be released under a general amnesty on the fiftieth anniversary of the October Revolution, but this turned out to be false as the amnesty did not apply to political prisoners. Daniel spent four years of captivity at the Dubravlag, a Gulag camp in Mordovia, and one year in Vladimir Prison.

== Late years and influence ==
Daniel was released and refused to emigrate, as was customary among Soviet dissidents, and lived in Kaluga before moving to Moscow.

According to Fred Coleman, "Historians now have no difficulty pinpointing the birth of the modern Soviet dissident movement. It began in February 1966 with the trial of Andrei Sinyavsky and Yuli Daniel, two Russian writers who ridiculed the Communist regime in satires smuggled abroad and published under pen names. They didn't realize at the time that they were starting a movement that would help end Communist rule."

Daniel and Sinyavsky did not intend to oppose the Soviet Union. Daniel was genuinely worried about a resurgence of the Cult of Personality under Nikita Khrushchev, which inspired his story This is Moscow Speaking, while Sinyavsky affirmed that he believed socialism was the way forward but that the methods employed were at times erroneous. Shortly before Daniel's death, Bulat Okudzhava acknowledged that some translations published under his name had in fact been ghostwritten by Daniel, because he was featured on a blacklist of authors banned from being published in the Soviet Union.

Daniel died on 30 December 1988, and Sinyavsky and his wife Maria Rozanova immediately flew to his funeral from France, where they had emigrated in 1973 after Sinyavsky's release. Daniel was buried in Vagankovo Cemetery, a popular burial place in Moscow for members of the arts community.

== Family ==
His son Alexander Daniel is a mathematician and his grandson Michael Daniel is a linguist.

== Bibliography ==
Books

- "Бегство" (The Escape), 1956
- "Человек из МИНАПа" (A Man from MINAP), 1960
- "Говорит Москва" (This is Moscow Speaking), 1961
- "Искупление" (The Redemption), 1964
- "Руки" (The Hands)
- "Письмо другу" (A Letter to a Friend), 1969
- "Ответ И.Р.Шафаревичу" (The Response to Igor Shafarevich), 1975
- "Книга сновидений" (A Book of Dreams)
- "Я все сбиваюсь на литературу..." Письма из заключения. Стихи (The Letters from Prison), 1972 (ISBN 0-87955-501-7)
- "This is Moscow Speaking", and Other Stories, Collins, Harvill: London, 1968, translated by Michael Scammell.

Articles

- Daniel, Yuli (February 1989). "Satirist who stood trial for freedom". Index on Censorship. 18 (2): 42. doi:10.1080/03064228908534600. S2CID 220430402.
