= Stanislovas Žvirgždas =

Lithuanian photographer

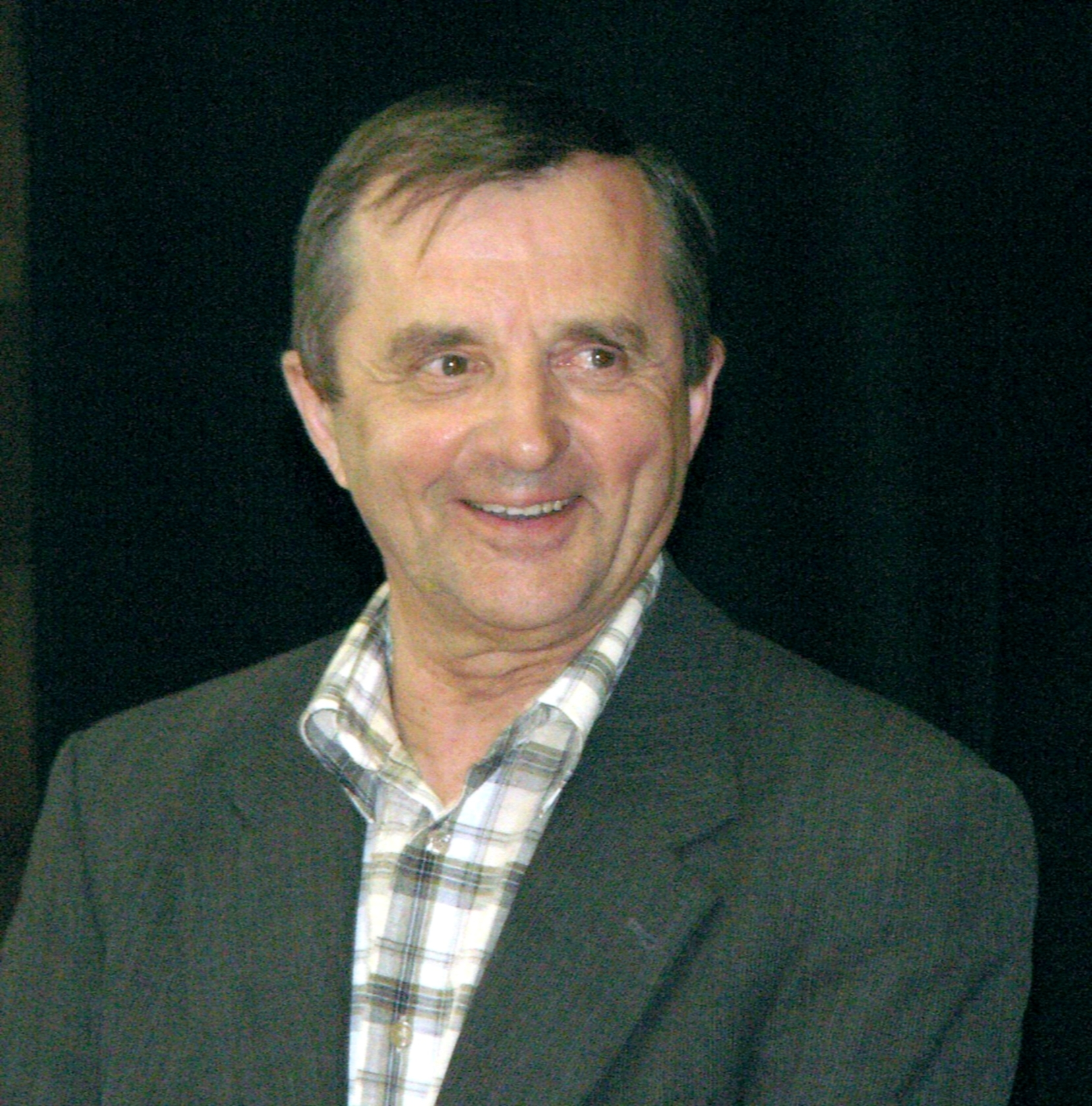

Stanislovas Žvirgždas (born 13 September 1941) is a Lithuanian photographer, particularly of landscapes, and a photography historian.

== Life and work ==
Born in Balbieriškis (Prienai), Žvirgždas studied history at Vilnius University in 1960–61, but after participating in an event in which the banned Lithuanian flag was raised he was sentenced to Gulag labor camps, served in Mordovia (in Dubravlag) until 1965. In 1972 he studied photography at the University of Popular Art (Moscow) and thereafter worked as a photographer.

Žvirgždas has had solo exhibitions in Kishinev (1982), Yevpatoria (1983), Zaragoza (1984), Moscow (1985, 2000), Nyíregyháza (1988, 2002), Severomorsk (1988), Tel Aviv (1990), Homyel (1990), Hamburg (1991), Frankfurt (1992), St Petersburg (1992), Portland (1994), Paris (1994), Tokyo (1997), Yaroslavl (2001), and Lviv (2003); as well as within Lithuania.

== Books by Žvirgždas ==
- Fotografija / Photographs. Vilnius: Lietuvos fotomenininkų sąjunga, 1995.
- Vilnijos peizažai. Vilnius: Lietuvos fotomenininkų sąjunga, 1999.
- Susipynusios vieno medžiošakos. Vilnius: Lietuvos fotomenininkų sąjunga, 1995.
- (With S. Valiulis.) Fotografijos slėpiniai. Vilnius: Lietuvos fotomenininkų sąjunga, 2002.
- Mūsų miestelių fotografai. Vilnius: Lietuvos fotomenininkų sąjunga, 2003.
- Lietuviški peizažai / Lithuanian Landscapes. N.p.: VAGA, 2004. ISBN 5-415-01737-2
