= Fantastic Stories =

Short story collection by Andrei Sinyavsky

First edition (publ. Pantheon Books) Cover art by Lois Ehlert

Fantastic Stories (Russian: Фантастические повести, romanized: Fantasticheskiye povesti) is a collection of six short stories written by Soviet author Andrei Sinyavsky under the pseudonym Abram Tertz between 1955 and 1961, first published by Pantheon Books in 1963. The stories are titled "At the Circus", "The Graphomaniacs", "The Tenants", "You and I", "The Icicle", and "Phkents". All of the fantastic tales are written in the style of "fantastic realism", which combines phantasmagorical art with socialist realism.
