= Tajik State Pedagogical University =

Coordinates: 38°35′37″N 68°47′09″E

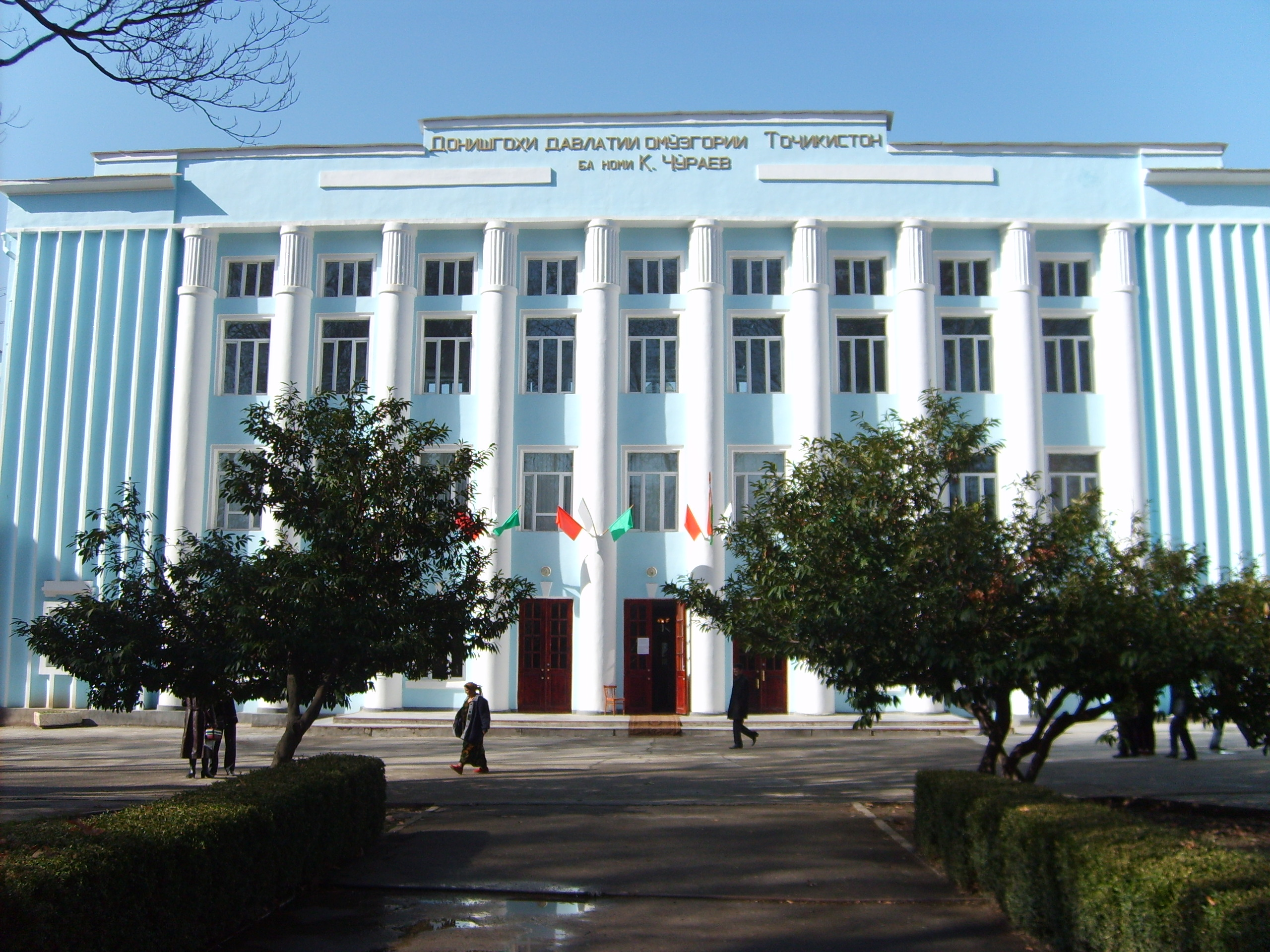
Tajik State Pedagogical University

Tajik State Pedagogical University (Russian: Таджикский государственный педагогический университет имени С. Айни, romanized: Tadzhikskiy gosudarstvennyy pedagogicheskiy universitet imeni S. Ayni; Tajik: Донишгоҳи давлатии омӯзгории Тоҷикистон ба номи С. Айнӣ, romanized: Donishgohi davlatii omūzgorii Tojikiston ba nomi S. Aynī) is a university in Tajikistan. It is located in Dushanbe at 121 Rudaki Street.

== Notable alumni ==
- Alexios Schandermani
- Mamlakat Nakhangova
- Lāyiq Shēralī
- Ibragim Khasanov
