= Elmira Shahtakhtinskaya =

Azerbaijani painter (1930–1996)

Elmira Shahtakhtinskaya Elmira Şahtaxtinskaya
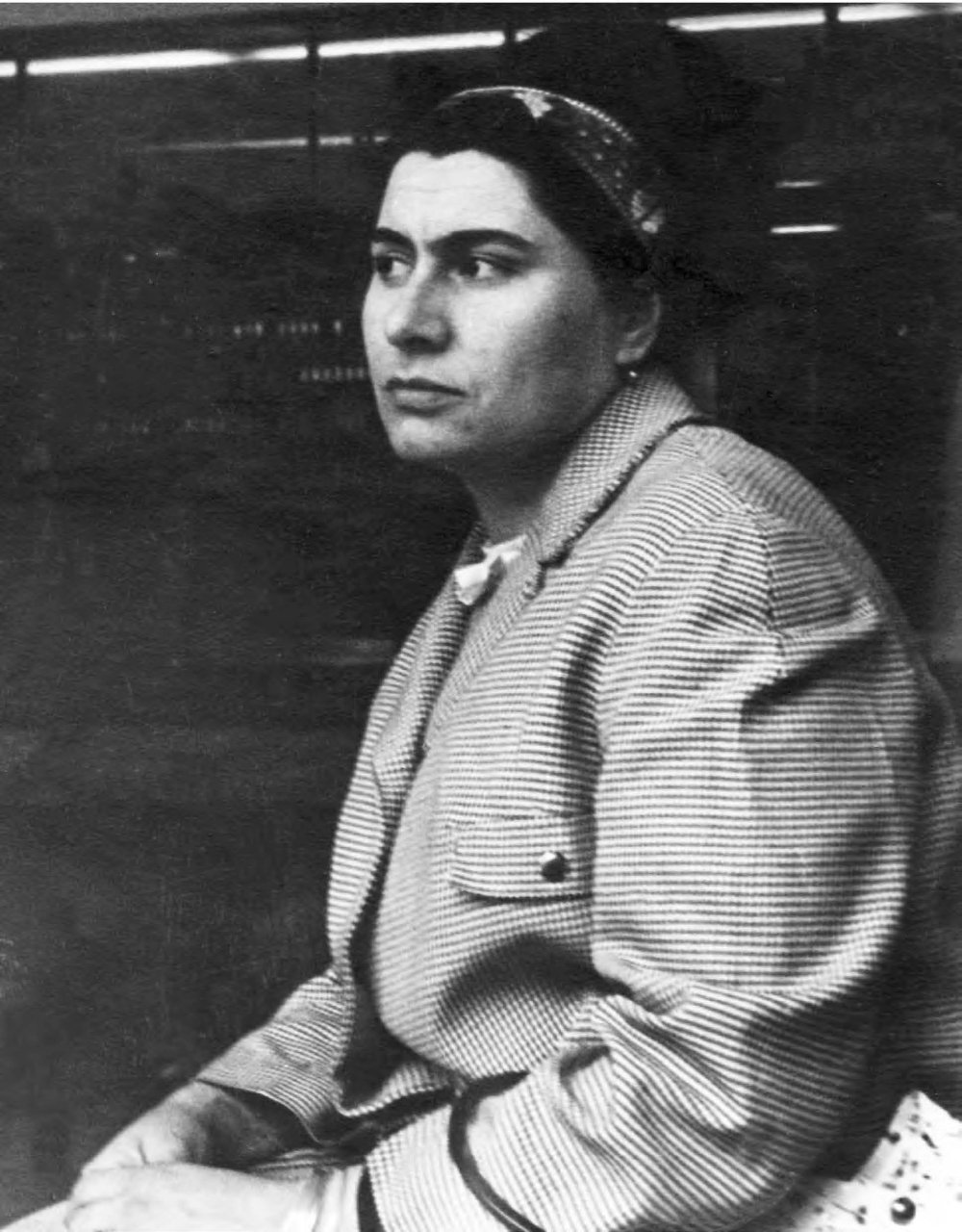
- Born: Elmira Həbibulla qızı Şahtaxtinskaya; 25 October 1930; Baku, Azerbaijan SSR
- Died: 13 October 1996 (aged 65); Moscow, Russian SSR
- Resting place: Alley of Honor
- Occupation: Painter
- Spouse: Ogtay Sadigzade
- Awards: Honored Art Worker of the Azerbaijan SSR People's Artist of the Azerbaijan SSR Order of the Badge of Honour

Elmira Shahtakhtinskaya (Azerbaijani: Elmira Həbibulla qızı Şahtaxtinskaya; 25 October 1930 – 13 October 1996) was a painter, Honored Art Worker of the Azerbaijan SSR, and the People's Artist of the Azerbaijan SSR.

== Biography ==
Elmira Shahtakhtinskaya was born on 25 October 1930 in Baku. Her first education was in Baku. She then graduated from Painting School named after Azim Azimzade in 1950. Later, she studied at Surikov Moscow Art Institute in 1951–1956. Her thesis was the poster "40 years of October". She returned to Azerbaijan, lived and worked in Baku.

Elmira Shahtakhtinskaya achieved success while working in the portrait genre. Among the famous portrait works of the artist the art figures that are more remarkable include "Muslim Magomayev", "Huseyn Javid", "Arif Malikov", "Fikret Amirov", "Uzeyir Hajibeyov", "Sattar Bahlulzade" and others.

In 1963, she was awarded the title of Honored Art Worker of the Azerbaijan SSR and in 1977, she was awarded the title of People's Artist of the Azerbaijan SSR.

In the late 1980s, she began to paint more landscapes. She painted landscapes not only of her native land (Baku, Zaqatala District), but also of Moscow Region, the Black Sea, London, Prague, Stockholm, etc. Among her most famous paintings of this genre, it is worth noting “The Old Tree”, “In the Old Shagan”, “Shusha-Isabulag”, “In the Pir-Gulu Forest”, “On the Bank of Bilgia”, “Rocks”, “Ancient Fortress”, “Mountains near Sheki".

In the 1970s, the poster series "Azerbaijan is a land of ancient culture", a gallery of portraits of Azerbaijani scientists, literary and art figures, machine tools and "In Czechoslovakia" (1957), "The Socialist Baku" series (1958-1959), "Bulgaria" (1963), and "Novruz Holiday" (1970) watercolors were created by the artist. Her personal exhibitions were demonstrated in Moscow (1957), Kaunas (1967), Baku (1967, 1989), Nakhchivan (city) (1979). Elmira Shahtakhtinskaya was awarded the "Order of Honor".

The artist died on 13 October 1996 in Moscow and was buried in the Alley of Honor in Baku. The documentary movie about the artist "Elmira Shahtakhtinskaya" was filmed in 2010.
