= Engelsina Markizova =

Russian historian (1928–2004)

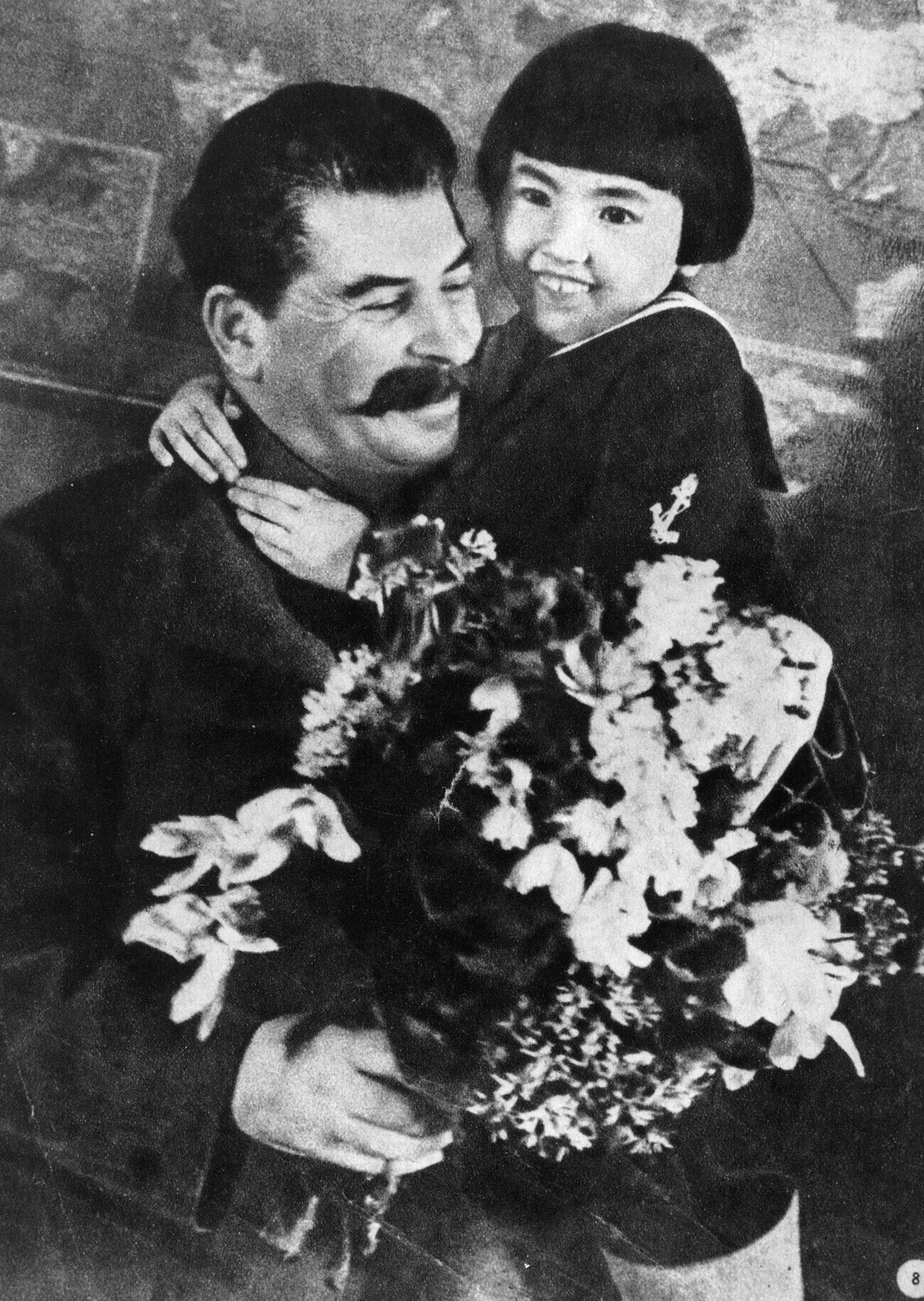
- Markizova as a child hugging Joseph Stalin, January 27, 1936
- Born: Engelsina Ardanovna Markizova; November 16, 1928; Verkhneudinsk, Buryat ASSR, Soviet Union
- Died: May 11, 2004 (aged 75); Antalya, Turkey
- Other name: "Gelya"
- Citizenship: Soviet
- Education: MSU Faculty of History
- Occupation: Orientalist
- Children: 3

Engelsina "Gelya" Sergeyevna Markizova (Russian: Энгельси́на Серге́евна Маркизова, born Engelsina Ardanovna Markizova, Russian: Энгельсина Ардановна Маркизова later Cheshkova, Russian: Чешкова; 16 November 1928 – 11 May 2004) was a Soviet Russian historian, orientalist, specialist in Southeast Asia, and candidate of historical sciences. She achieved fame as a child after being depicted in a photo embracing the Soviet leader Joseph Stalin, an image which became one of the most enduring propaganda symbols of the Stalin era, when it was widespread in schools, pioneer's camps and children's institutions.

Later in life, Markizova became an Orientalist scholar, specializing in China and India, married twice and had three children. She learned, like the rest of Russia, the extent of Stalin's bloody rule after his death. Markizova died of a heart attack in May 2004 while on holiday with her son in Antalya, Turkey. She was 75 years old.

== Early life ==
Gelya was born in 1928 to a Russian Civil War veteran, Buryat-Mongolian Soviet, party and government figure Ardan Angadykovich Markizov (1898-1938) and Dominika Fedorovna Markizova. The family lived in Verkhneudinsk (now named Ulan-Ude) in a house on Stalin Street. Since 1936, her father had been the People's Commissar for Agriculture of the Buryat-Mongol Autonomous Province and the second secretary of the Buryat-Mongolian Regional Committee of the All-Union Communist Party (Bolsheviks). Her mother was the daughter of a Transbaikal Cossack, Fyodor Pushkarev, who received a gold watch as a gift from Russian Emperor Nicholas II when he traveled through Siberia in 1896. Engelsina had an older brother, Vladlen (1926-1998), who was born in the village of Barguzin.

Gelya was named after the communist theorist Friedrich Engels, and her brother Vladlen was named after Vladimir Lenin. The Ardanovs' large house had a large library, and their country house was located next to the country house of the People's Commissar of Finance of the Buryat-Mongolian ASSR, Batozhargal Bazaron, whose children were friends with Gelya.

=== Meeting with Stalin ===
In January 1936 (at 7 years old), she was pictured in a photo with Joseph Stalin which was later used for propaganda purposes after she found Stalin at a Kremlin state ceremony and presented him with a bouquet of flowers reportedly saying "These flowers are for Comrade Stalin from the children of the Buryat-Mongol Republic". Stalin then picked her up in a hug as cameras all around snapped up the now iconic image The photo was published on the front page of Izvestia on 1 May and then on 26 June in Pravda, the newspaper of the Communist Party. The image spread after its publication, finding its way into kindergartens, hospitals and schools across the Soviet Union, and it was later turned into a marble sculpture by Georgi Lavrov, a renowned sculptor of the time propelling Markizova to instant fame, and leading her to receive preferential treatment in school and Communist Party meetings.

In 1937 her father, who was a provincial official for the Buryatia region, was taken from their home by secret police agents, standing accused of being a Japanese spy and a Trotskyite. Despite appeals to Stalin from her mother through Engelsina Markizova for his clemency, he was executed in July 1938 on the false charge that he was a Japanese spy, a Trotskyite, a terrorist, and subversive plotting against Stalin. Now the daughter of an enemy of the people, Markizova found herself shunned by her classmates whilst her mother was imprisoned for a year and ultimately deported to southern Kazakhstan, dying there at the age of 32 in what has been described as either a "mysterious accident", "a murder that authorities never investigated", or suicide. Now an orphan, Markizova lived with relatives in Moscow. At this point, rather than removing or altering her photos, Soviet propagandists decided that it was easier to deliberately misattribute the identity of the girl depicted in them than remove all the photos, sculptures and mosaics. Therefore, the girl in the picture would be thereon officially identified as Mamlakat Nakhangova, a Tajik girl who had earned the Order of Lenin by working as a cotton picker. The images began to slowly disappear post-1953, with the rise of de-Stalinization.

=== School and university ===
After her mother's death, Markizova and her brother went to Moscow (around 1941, when she was about 13 years old), since Dominika had given her instructions at the time: "If anything happens to me, take your brother and go to Moscow - to your aunt". According to Russian educator Yevgeny Yamburg, "Gela, having become an orphan, lived in poverty and obscurity for a long time". According to publicist Sergei Tsyrkun, Markizova "ended up in a special NKVD detention center for children of enemies of the people".

According to Markizova's daughter Lola Komarova, at that time her aunt, who was only 12 years older than Markizova, lived in Moscow with her husband Sergei Dorbeev. According to Komarova, Dorbeev, who adopted Gelya, was an employee of the NKVD apparatus of the USSR “in some minor position, like a quartermaster” and quit “for the sake of Gelya”. The couple adopted Gelya and gave her their last name (Dorbeeva) and a new patronymic (Sergeevna). With her new last name and patronymic, Gelya went to school located in the courtyard of her new house. At school, teachers and students knew that this was the girl depicted on the posters with Stalin. Engelsina later said: “And the first thing I saw on the stairs was a huge portrait of a girl with Stalin. Most likely, my aunt accidentally let it slip to the director that it was me. A real pilgrimage of children began - everyone wanted to look at me.” Meanwhile, Lola Komarova adhered to a slightly different version: “Maybe my mother herself let it slip then. “She was not a secretive person by nature”. However, writer Anatoly Pristavkin, in 2003, telling a completely different story about his conversation with Engelsina: “She told me how she sat at school under a typical portrait and was afraid that she would be recognized and dealt with too”. Engelsina herself recalled: “After my mother’s death, my life was completely invisible. I was completely excommunicated from this portrait. No one needed to be told that it was me. Because no one would have believed it. I practically forgot about this episode and lived like an ordinary Soviet person…”.

Soon, Markizova moved to Yoshkar-Ola, where her cousin Geta (Tserima) lived. At that time, the Yoshkar-Ola stadium Spartak was decorated with a huge poster depicting Gelya and Stalin. In 1947, she entered the Mari State Pedagogical Institute. In Yoshkar-Ola, Markizova was part of a group of young people, among whom was Yuri Nikolaevich Bashnin, who later became an associate professor in the literature department of the Karelian Pedagogical Institute and a candidate of philological sciences. Yuri Bashnin recalled: “I met Gela in 1947 at the Mari State Pedagogical Institute, where we entered almost simultaneously, only in different faculties. My friend Vitaly, Engelsina, her cousin Geta (Tserima), and several other guys and girls formed a wonderful group, where warm and trusting relationships were established.” Bashnin’s friend, Vitaly Bondarevsky (later a historian), was in love with Engelsina, but she refused his proposal. In 1948, Engelsina Dorbeeva entered the history department of Moscow State University (Oriental Studies Department), where she studied together with Stalin’s daughter Svetlana. Engelsina recalled it this way: “We studied in the same department. I knew that she was Stalin’s daughter. And she knew that I was the girl who had been at her father’s reception. But we didn’t try to get closer to her. If our fathers are enemies, how can we communicate with her…”. According to Markizova's son, when Stalin died, “mother cried.” According to Markizova herself: “Everyone cried. I had an eight-month-old daughter, and I was sorry, I thought – Stalin died – and she will never see him”.

== Adult life ==
After graduating from university, Markizova was friends with the future activist of the dissident movement in the USSR, Lyudmila Alekseyeva, who had studied at the history department of Moscow State University since 1945. They had a mutual friend, Lida Fursova, with whom Markizova had been friends since she was a student. Alekseyeva, describing this friendship in her memoirs published in 2006, recalled how she, Fursova and Markizova visited the restaurant Prague: "Located at the beginning of Arbat, a ten-minute walk from the Russian State Library, it became our favorite place. We often came here during the day. We ordered a salad, coffee with cake and talked for two hours about our affairs and admirers, not forgetting to flirt with the waiter at the same time... It was funny to watch the undisguised interest with which the visitors looked at the graceful, dark-eyed Gela. She was one of those beauties whose presence in a restaurant makes both men and women accidentally drop their forks.”

According to writer and orientalist Kir Bulychev, after university, Markizova worked at a school. Later, she also taught Russian at the university, worked at the USSR Ministry of Foreign Affairs, the Institute of Oriental Studies of the USSR Academy of Sciences, and the V. I. Lenin Library.

Soon, Markizova married Erik Naumovich Komarov (1927-2013), an orientalist and Indologist who held the position of Soviet cultural attaché in India in 1959-1961. Markizova's mother-in-law was the Soviet architect Lidiya Komarova. Together with her husband, Engelsina worked in India, and found herself in the company of Prime Minister Jawaharlal Nehru, as well as the First Secretary of the CPSU Central Committee Nikita Khrushchev and the USSR Minister of Culture Yekaterina Furtseva, who visited India, and whose photographs were published in many newspapers. From her marriage to Komarov, in 1952, she had a daughter, Lola Erikovna Komarova, who later became a Russian scientist and psychologist. In 1989, Engelsina became a grandmother: her daughter Lola gave birth to a son, Arseny Lopukhin.

In the 1960s, Engelsina married for a second time to orientalist Marat Cheshkov, with whom she lived until her death. From this marriage, a son, Alexei, was born. Living in Moscow with her husband, son and other relatives, she worked at the Institute of Oriental Studies. Candidate of Historical Sciences (1974, dissertation "Vietnam-Cambodian Relations in the First Half of the 19th Century").

She promised to tell her friend Lyudmila Alekseeva her whole story, which Alekseeva reminded her of in 1976, when the samizdat magazine Memory was being prepared. Markizova later changed her mind, saying: "It's not time yet". During perestroika, a German journalist was interested in Markizova's story. In July 1988, Engelsina gave an interview to a correspondent for the newspaper Trud.

In 1995, in an interview given during the filming of the documentary Engelsina, the Daughter of the People's Commissar, she discussed how she became familiar with her father's criminal case: "Oddly enough, they gave me this case very quickly. This is a large folder - 800 pages. The arrest warrant, interrogations... I was amazed that everything was written very competently, without a single spelling mistake, absolutely... But my father is a Buryat. He was, of course, an educated person, but not so much as to write absolutely correctly. And later I learned that all these confessions were written by one investigator who was sent... And the verdict that he was found guilty...".

=== Death ===
A documentary film about the fate of Markizova was also planned entitled Stalin and Gela by Belarusian documentary filmmaker Anatoly Alai, who met with Cheshkova in 2004 and recorded a 10-minute interview (in another place Alai reports a 40-minute interview). There was an agreement to shoot a documentary. In an interview with Komsomolskaya Pravda v Belarusi, the director reported: “We agreed that she would rest, get some treatment, and then we would start filming seriously”. According to Alay: “She really wanted to look even more beautiful on TV and went to Turkey to get a tan. They found her motionless on a sun lounger”. On May 11, 2004, Markizova died of a heart attack while on vacation in Antalya, Turkey, where she went with her son. She was 75 years old. The film Stalin and Gelya was completed after Markizova's death. The film was created from 40 minutes of spontaneously filmed footage and old footage from the 1950s that had Alay found in the archives.

Georgi Lavrov, who immortalised the image in marble, was later imprisoned for 17 years in Stalin's labor camps.
