= Temlag =

Gulag labor camp

Temlag (Темла́г), Temnikovsky Corrective Labor Camp (Темниковский исправи́тельно-трудово́й ла́герь), or Temnikovsky ITL (Темниковский ИТЛ) was a camp of the Gulag labor camp system of the Soviet Union. It was in the Mordovian ASSR. Its name derives from the town of Temnikov because it was in Temnikov District, although its administration was in Yavas. It existed during 1931-1948. Major industries were logging, wood processing industries, and railroad construction. In addition it had a wide variety of other small-scale industries: construction, metalworking, railroad servicing, clothing and footwear production, etc. Upon liquidation its assets were split. The camp system was transferred to Dubravlag while the industries were reorganized into the Temnikovsky Industrial Combine of Gulag (Темниковский Промкомбинат ГУЛАГа), which itself did not manage any camps, and later it was also merged into Dubravlag.

== Notable inmates ==
- Ida Averbakh, wife of Genrikh Yagoda
- Nikolai Engver, economist
- Nina Gagen-Torn, poet, writer, historian and ethnographer
- Rostislav Gorelov, artist
- Vendelín Javorka, Slovak Catholic priest, arrested as the "agent of Vatican"
- Theresa Kugel, a Dominican nun of the Russian Greek Catholic Church
- Pietro Leoni, Italian citizen, priest of the Russian Greek Catholic Church, and memoirist of the Gulag
- Unto Parvilahti, Finnish photographer, businessman, and SS-Officer
- Yakov Livshits
- Nikolai Lobachevsky
- Eduard Senkevich, "chekist," director (1931-33) of SLON
- Alexander Skoropis-Ioltukhovsky, Ukrainian activist
- Mark Sobol, poet
- Ruth Tamarina, Jewish poet
- Ümmügülsüm, Azerbaijani poet
