= Nina Gagen-Torn =

Swedish-Russian ethnographer (1900–1986)

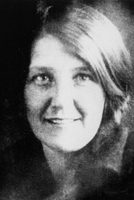
- Born: 15 December [O.S. 2 December] 1900; Saint Petersburg, Russian Empire
- Died: June 4, 1986 (aged 85); Leningrad, Soviet Union
- Education: Petrograd Institute of Geography; Petrograd University
- Occupations: Poet, historian, writer

Nina Ivanovna Gagen-Torn (Note: The original Swedish spelling of the family name is Hagen-Thorn.) (Russian: Ни́на Ива́новна Га́ген-То́рн, IPA: [ˈnʲinə ɪˈvanəvnə ˈɡaɡʲɪn ˈtorn]; 15 December [O.S. 2 December] 1900 — June 4, 1986) was a Russian and Soviet poet, writer, historian and ethnographer. Most of her research was in the area of ethnography of the peoples of the Soviet Union, Russian and Bulgarian folklore, and the history of the Russian ethnography

== Early life and education ==
She was born in St. Petersburg to the noble (dvoryan) family of Baron Ivan Eduardovich Gagen-Torn, physician, Russified Swede. She graduated from the Petrograd Institute of Geography and took a post-graduate course of the Petrograd University (1924). She was a lecturer, worked in the Museum of Ethnography and was secretary of the magazine Soviet Ethnography (1934).

== Great Purge ==
During the Great Purge, she spent the years of 1936–1942 in the Kolyma labor camps (Sevvostlag "Directorate of Northeastern Camps"), and 1942–1943 in exile. In 1946, she earned the degree of kandidat in ethnography with thesis "Elements of Dress of Volga Peoples as a Material for Ethnogenesis".

She was repressed for the second time during 1947-1952 and served in Mordovia (Temlag, reorganized into Dubravlag in 1948) After serving the term, she was permanently exiled to Yenisey. With the end of the Stalinist era, she was amnestied on April 16, 1954, and fully rehabilitated in 1956.

From 1964, she devoted herself to the study of The Tale of Igor's Campaign and put forth a number of original hypotheses.

== Research ==
Most of her research was in the area of ethnography of the peoples of the Soviet Union, Russian and Bulgarian folklore, and the history of the Russian ethnography. She also published short stories and poems. Two booklets of her poems were published posthumously.
