= Nina Dobrushina =

Russian linguist (born 1968)

- Born: 28 September 1968 (age 58); Moscow

Academic background
- Education: Moscow State University
- Thesis: (1995)
- Academic advisor: Grigory E. Kreidlin

Academic work
- Discipline: Linguist
- Main interests: linguistic typology, sociolinguistics, languages of Dagestan
- Website: Personal webpage

Nina Dobrushina (Russian: Добрушина, Нина Роландовна; born 28 September 1968) is a linguist from Russia specializing in linguistic typology, sociolinguistics, and the study of languages of Dagestan (Russia).

== Education and career ==
Dobrushina received her Candidate degree from the Department of Theoretical Linguistics at Moscow State University in 1995. In 2003, she joined the Higher School of Economics as an assistant professor, and in 2011, she became a full professor. For five years, she headed the Linguistic Convergence Laboratory at HSE. Since 2022, she has been a visiting professor at the University of Tübingen.

She was elected a member of the Academia Europaea in 2023.

== Scientific contributions ==
Dobrushina's contributions are primarily in the areas of Russian grammar, linguistic typology and the study of the languages of Dagestan.

In the area of grammar, her specialization is mood forms such as optatives and subjunctives, and she first became well known with her contribution on optatives to the World Atlas of Language Structures.

Over the last decade, Dobrushina has focused on the study of multilingualism and language contact in Dagestan. She was a co-organizer of the first conference on small-scale multilingualism and is a co-founder of this new subfield of multilingualism studies.

Dobrushina is one of the founders of the book series “Languages of the Caucasus”, the first open-access series in this area (published by Language Science Press).

== Personal life ==
Nina Dobrushina is the daughter of the mathematician Roland Dobrushin.

== Selected works ==
=== Books ===
- Dobrushina, N.R. 2016a. Soslagatelʹnoe naklonenie v russkom jazyke: opyt issledovanija grammatičeskoj semantiki [Subjunctive in Russian: a study in semantics of grammar]. Praga: Animedia Company.
- Daniel, Michael & Dobrushina, Nina & Ganenkov, Dmitry (eds.). 2019. The Mehweb language: Essays on phonology, morphology and syntax. Berlin: Language Science Press.

=== Articles ===
- Daniel, Michael & Chechuro, Ilia & Verhees, Samira & Dobrushina, Nina. 2021. Lingua francas as lexical donors: Evidence from Daghestan. Language 97(3). 520–560. (doi:10.1353/lan.2021.0046)
- Dobrushina, Nina. 2015. The verbless subjunctive in Russian. Scando-Slavica 61(1). 73–99.
- Dobrushina, Nina. 2016b. Multilingualism in highland Daghestan throughout the 20th century. Sociolinguistic transition in former Eastern Bloc countries: two decades after the regime change, 75–94.
- Dobrushina, Nina. 2019. On the Russian third person imperative particles pust’and puskaj. Russian Linguistics 43. 1–17.
- Dobrushina Nina. 2021. Negation in the complement clauses of fear-verbs. Functions of Language 28(2). 121–152.
- Dobrushina, Nina & van der Auwera, Johan & Goussev, Valentin. 2005. The optative. In Haspelmath, Martin & Dryer, Matthew S. & Gil, David & Comrie, Bernard (eds.), The world atlas of language structures, 298–301. Oxford: Oxford University Press. (<http://wals.info/chapter/73>)
- Pakendorf, Brigitte & Dobrushina, Nina & Khanina, Olesya. 2021. A typology of small-scale multilingualism. International Journal of Bilingualism 25(4). 835–859.
- van der Auwera, Johan & Dobrushina, Nina & Goussev, Valentin. 2003. A semantic map for imperative-hortatives. Contrastive analysis in language: Identifying linguistic units of comparison, 44–66. Springer.

=== Web resources ===
- Multidagestan, a database on Dagestanian multilingualism
