= Shakhandan =

Cemetery in Shamakhi, Azerbaijan

- Azerbaijani: Şaxəndan
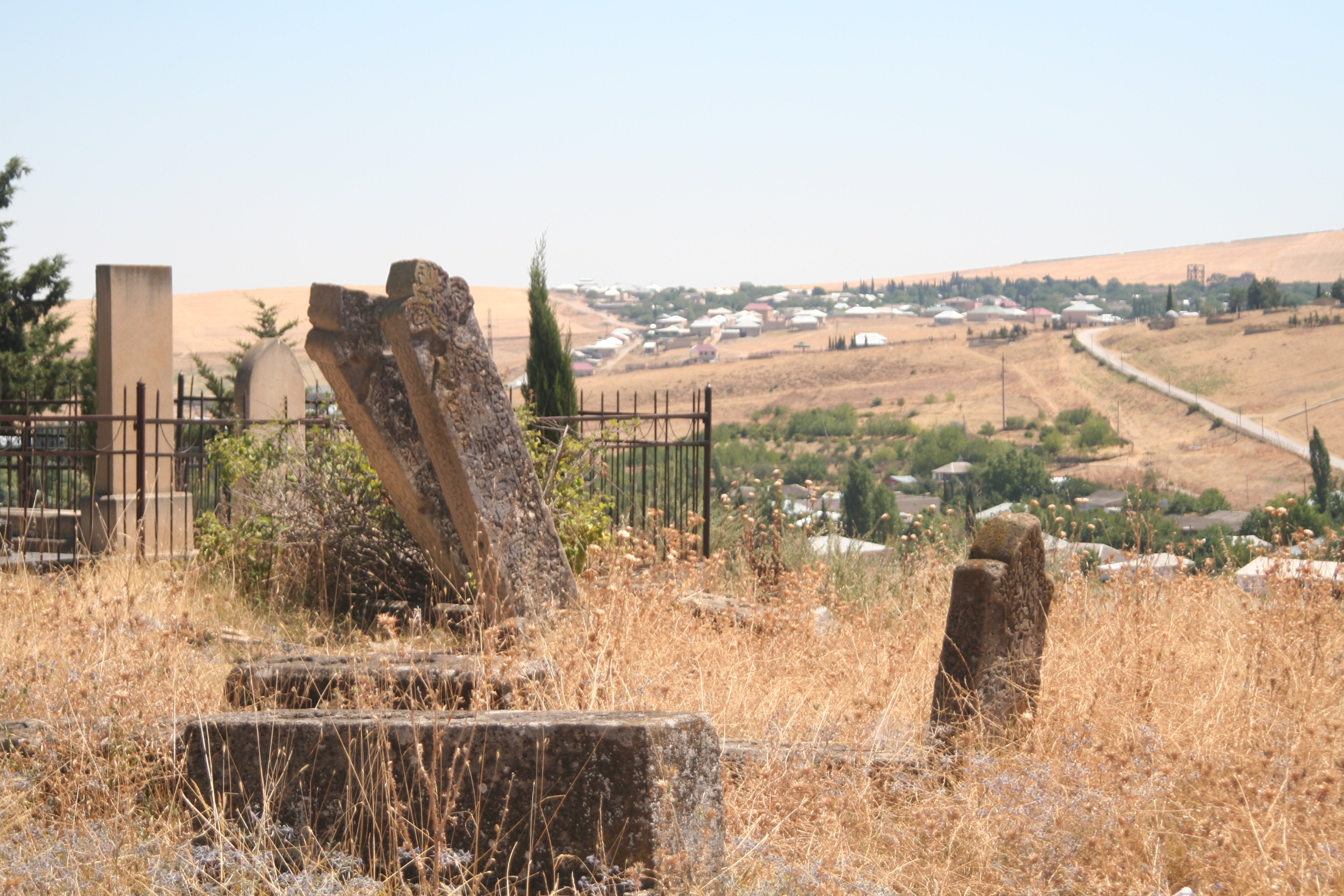

Details
- Location: Shamakhi
- Country: Azerbaijan
- Coordinates: 40.629006°N 48.632455°E
- Type: historic
- Style: Shirvan-Absheron architectural school
- Owned by: Protected by the state as an architectural monument of national importance

Shakhandan (Azerbaijani: Şaxəndan) is the oldest of the three surviving ancient cemeteries of the city of Shamakhi, Azerbaijan. It is located in the southwestern part of the city. The brother of the famous 15th century poet Nasimi, the poet Shakhandan (Shakhandan, Shah-i khandan), is supposedly buried here, and the cemetery bears his name.

== Description and study ==
According to the local residents, Shahide-khandan (handsome merry man) was the nickname of Nasimi's brother, and the cemetery is named after him, since he was buried here. In Shakhandan, the ruins of an octagonal mausoleum were discovered. Inside the mausoleum there are two graves, the headstone of one is slightly deepened into the ground. As a result of the atmospheric influences, the inscriptions were completely erased. On the reverse side of the deepened tombstone there is an image characteristic of the gravestones of Azerbaijan of the 14-15th centuries. The Azerbaijani archaeologist Huseyn Jiddi notes that this is probably the grave of "Shahide-Khandan" - Nasimi's brother. If this is true, then according to Jiddi, in the 14-15th centuries, the city's cemetery was located in this area. This is partly confirmed by other tombs of the 15th-16th centuries that are placed there. Many ancient gravestones of the cemetery have been lost, while some are underground.

During the construction work in the city in 1970–1971, in the western part of Shamakhy, where the old bazaar was once located, many graves were found around it. According to the Kufic inscriptions on the gravestones, researchers come to the conclusion that these graves date back to the 11-12th centuries. Once this cemetery extended to Shakhandan. According to Jiddi, Shakhandan was probably the main cemetery in Shamakhy in the Middle Ages. Soon, due to the expansion of the city, the main cemetery was moved to the hill, where the cemeteries "Yeddi gunbaz" and "Lalezar" are located.

The famous Azerbaijani poet Seyid Azim Shirvani bequeathed to be buried in the Shakhandan cemetery, and his grave is also located there.

== Gallery ==
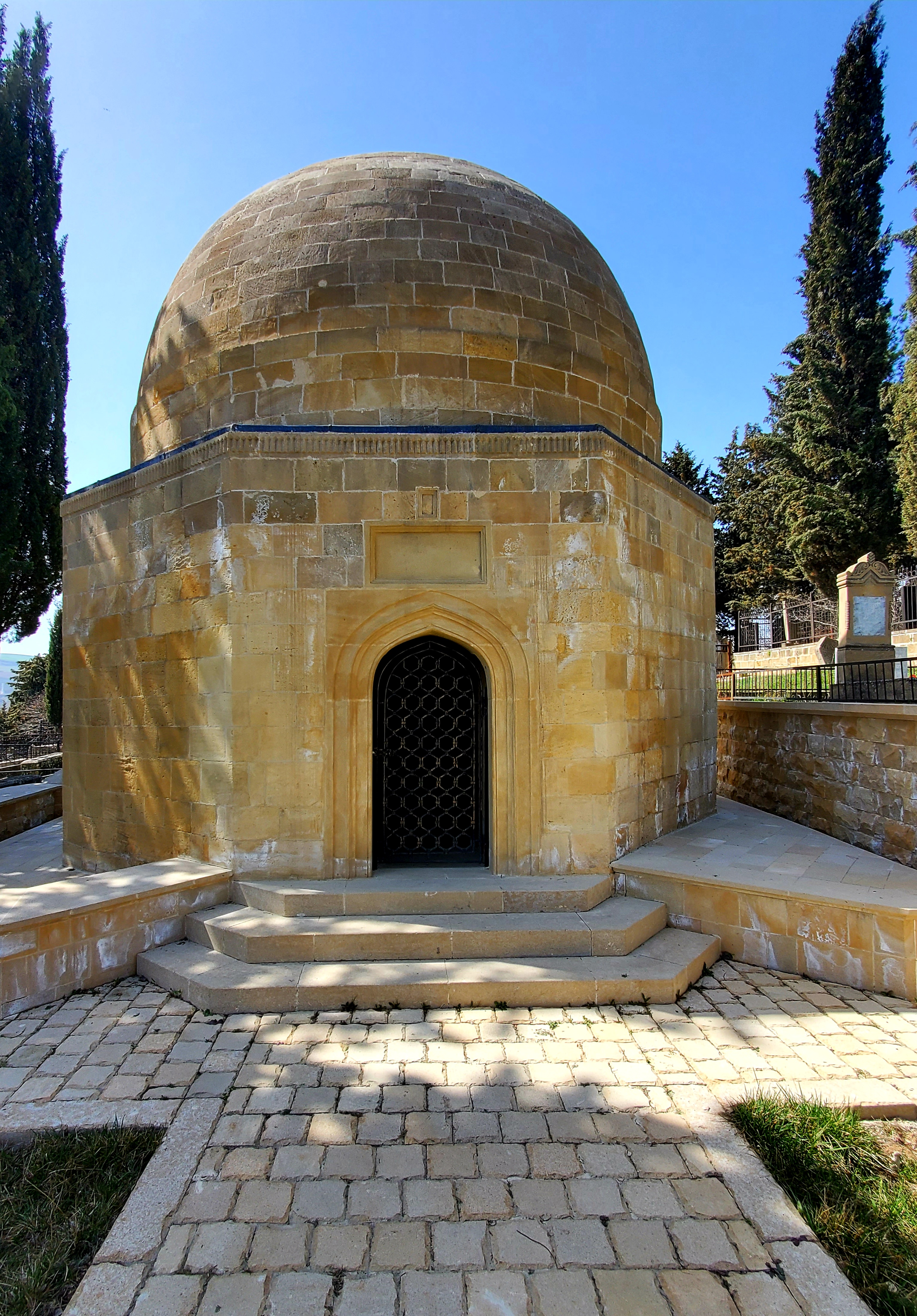

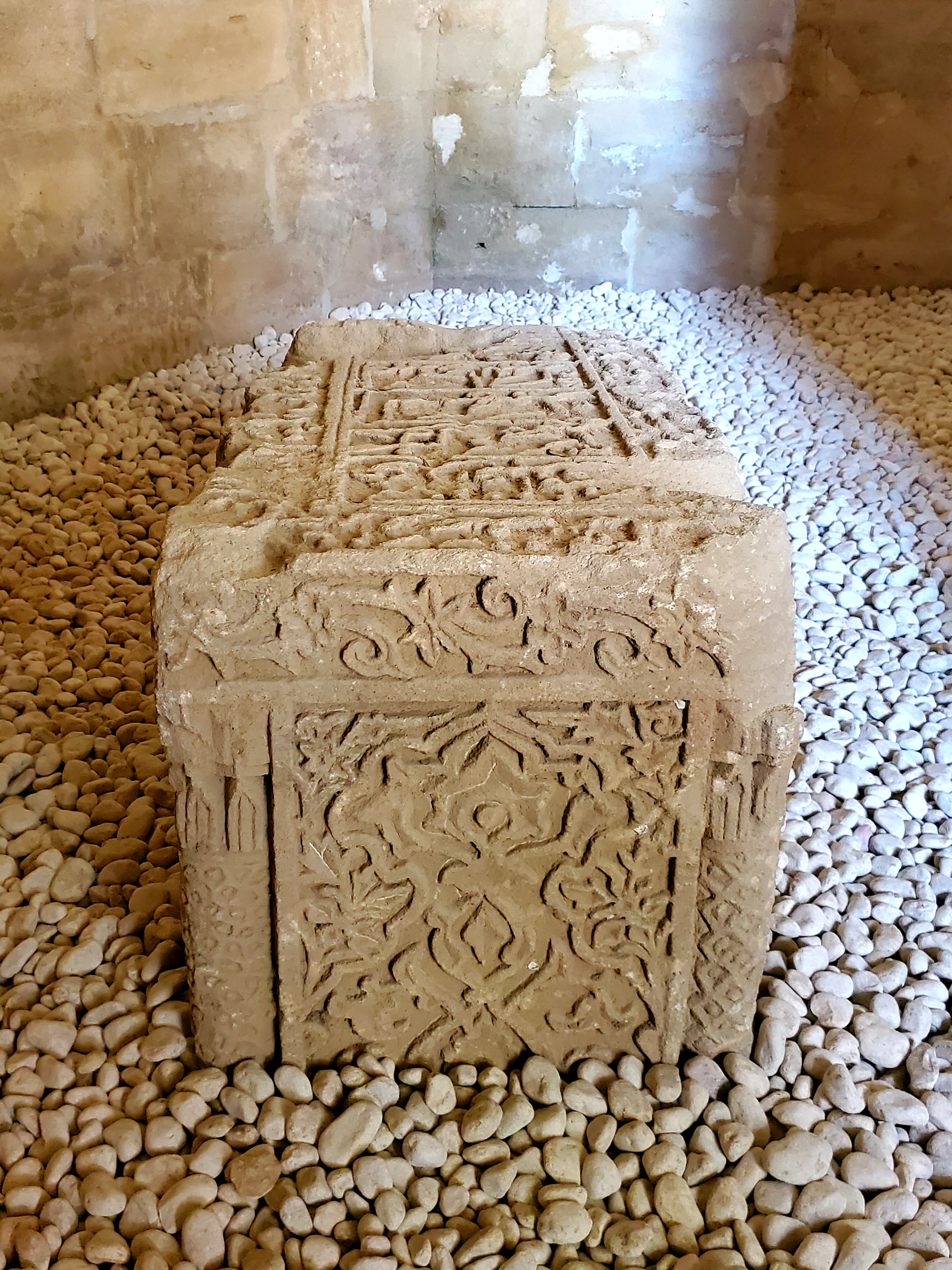

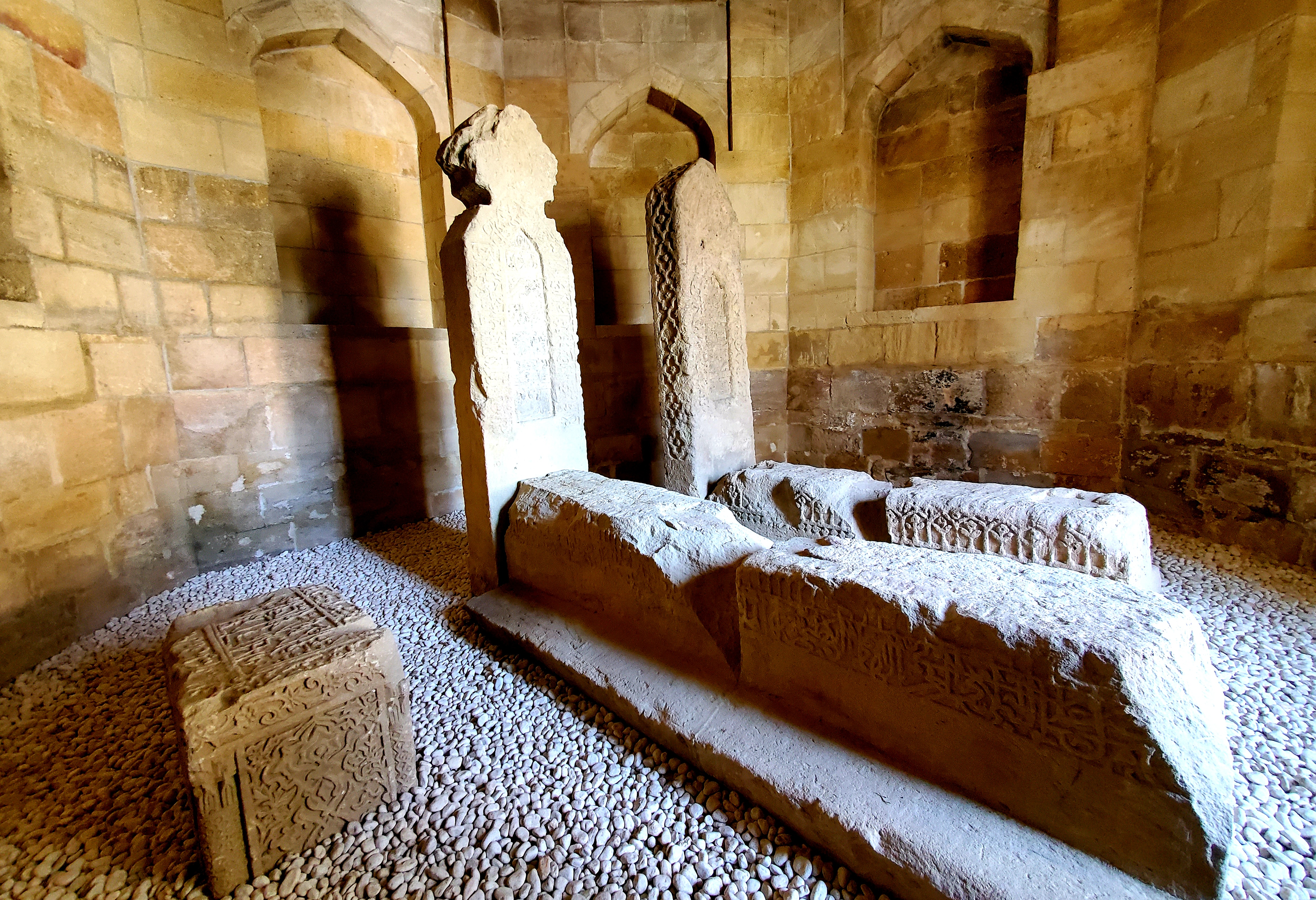

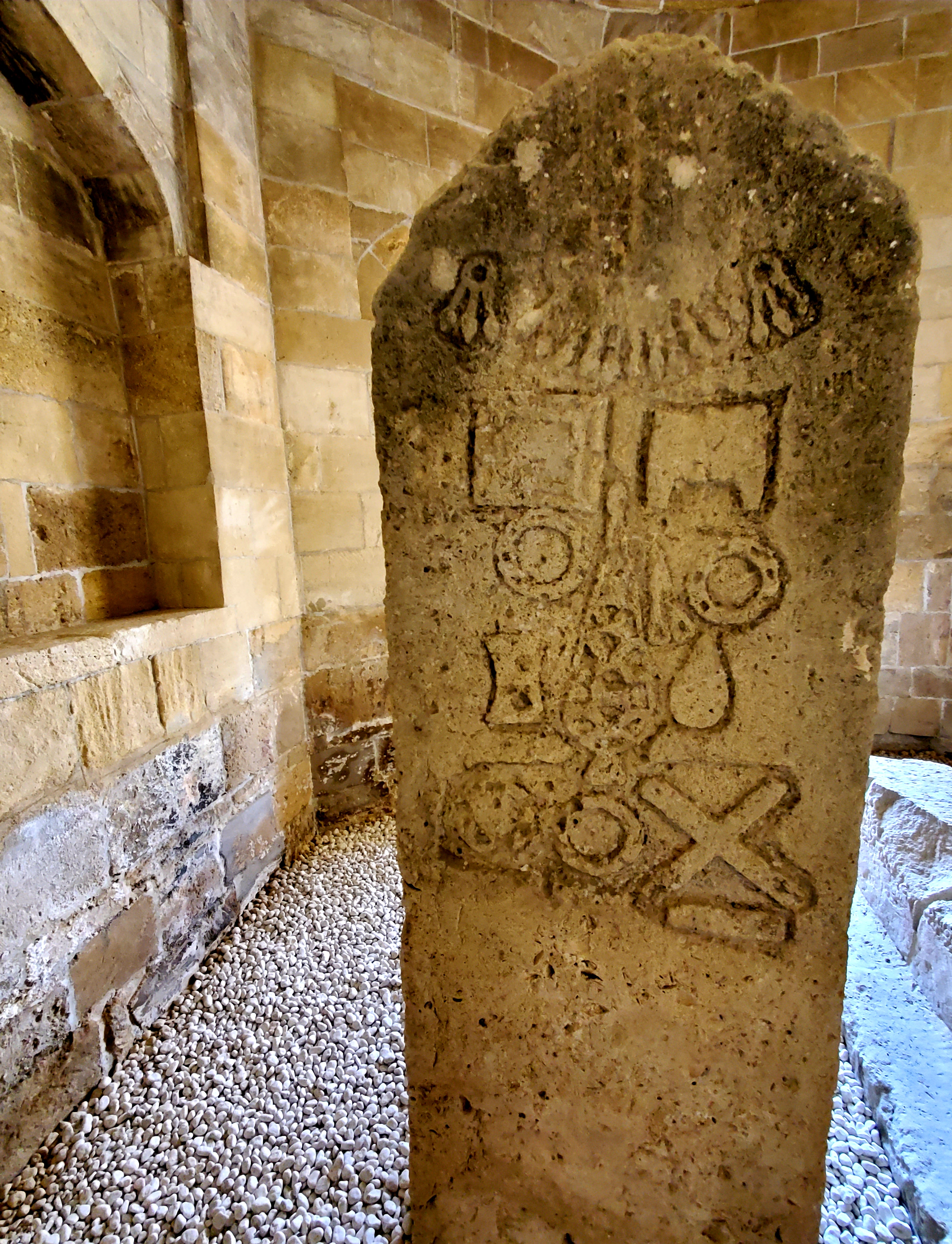

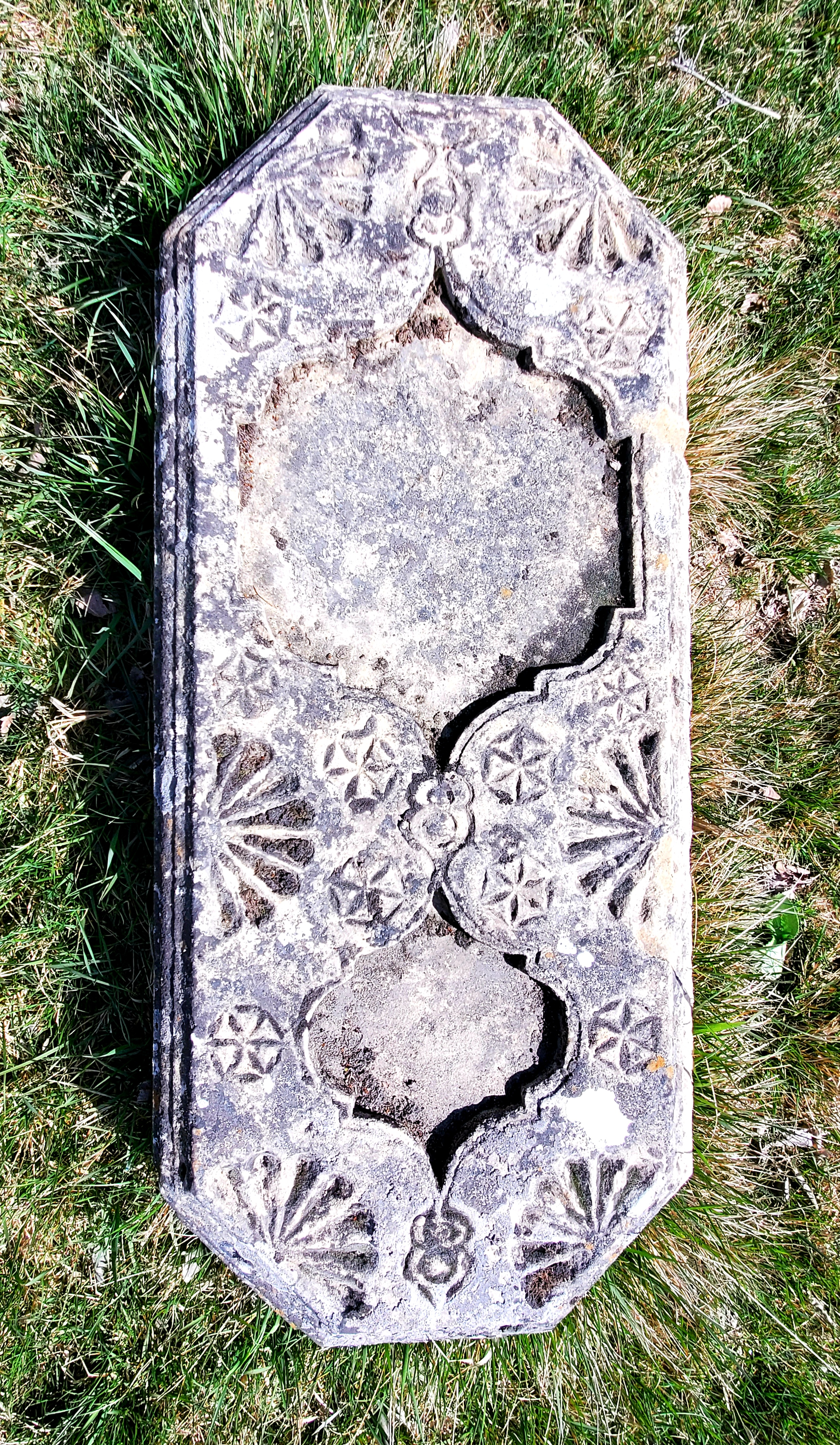

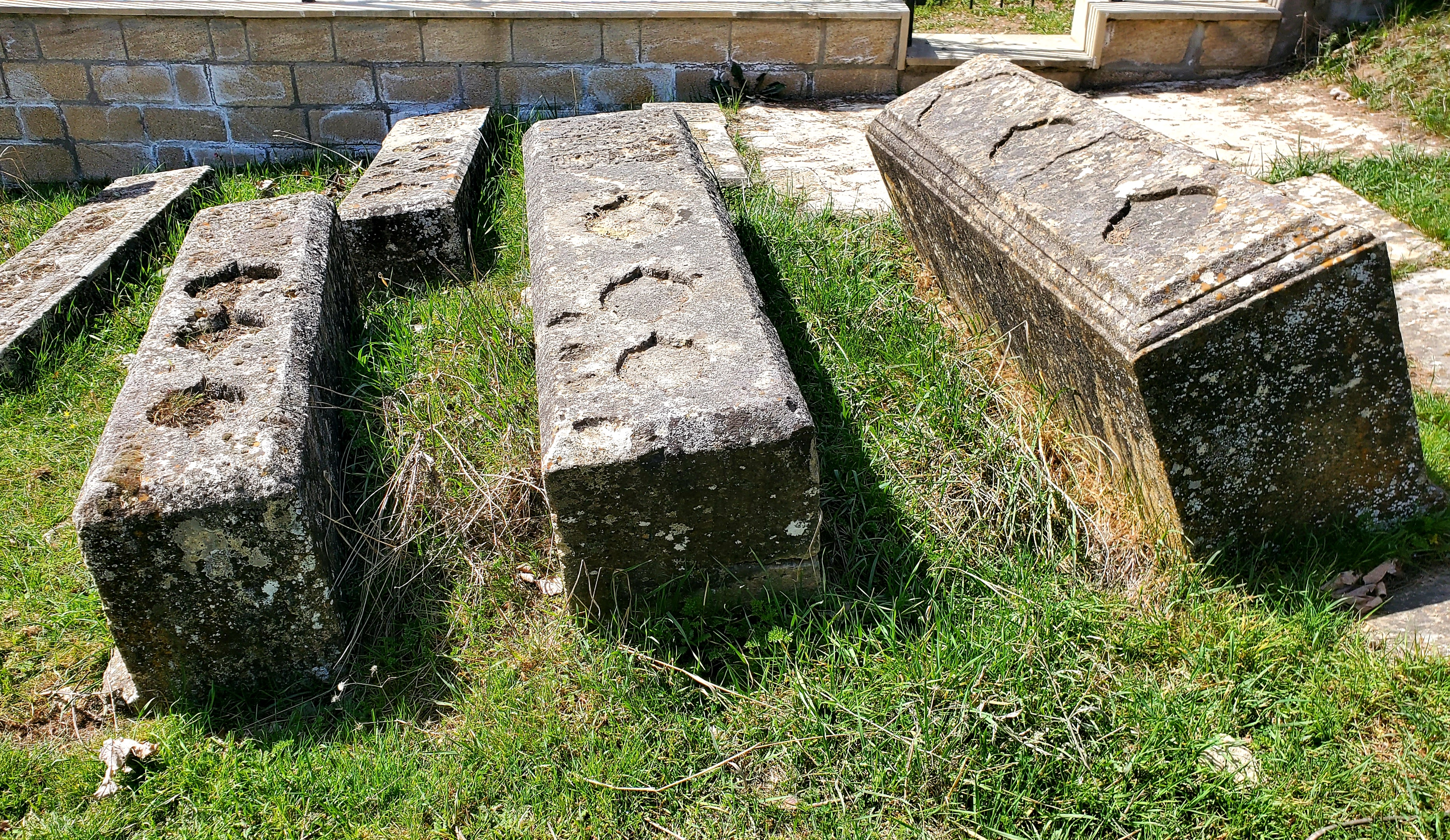

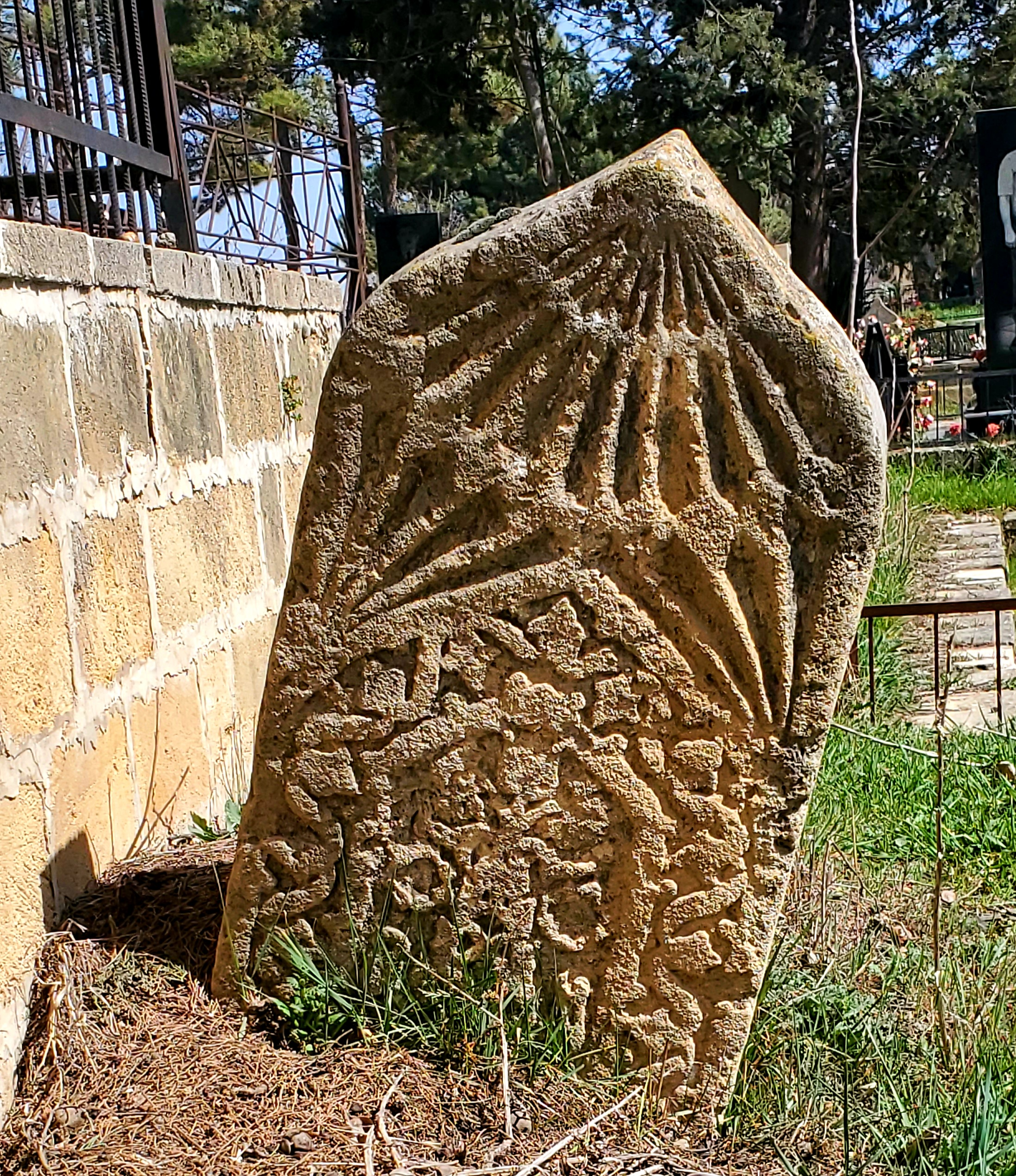

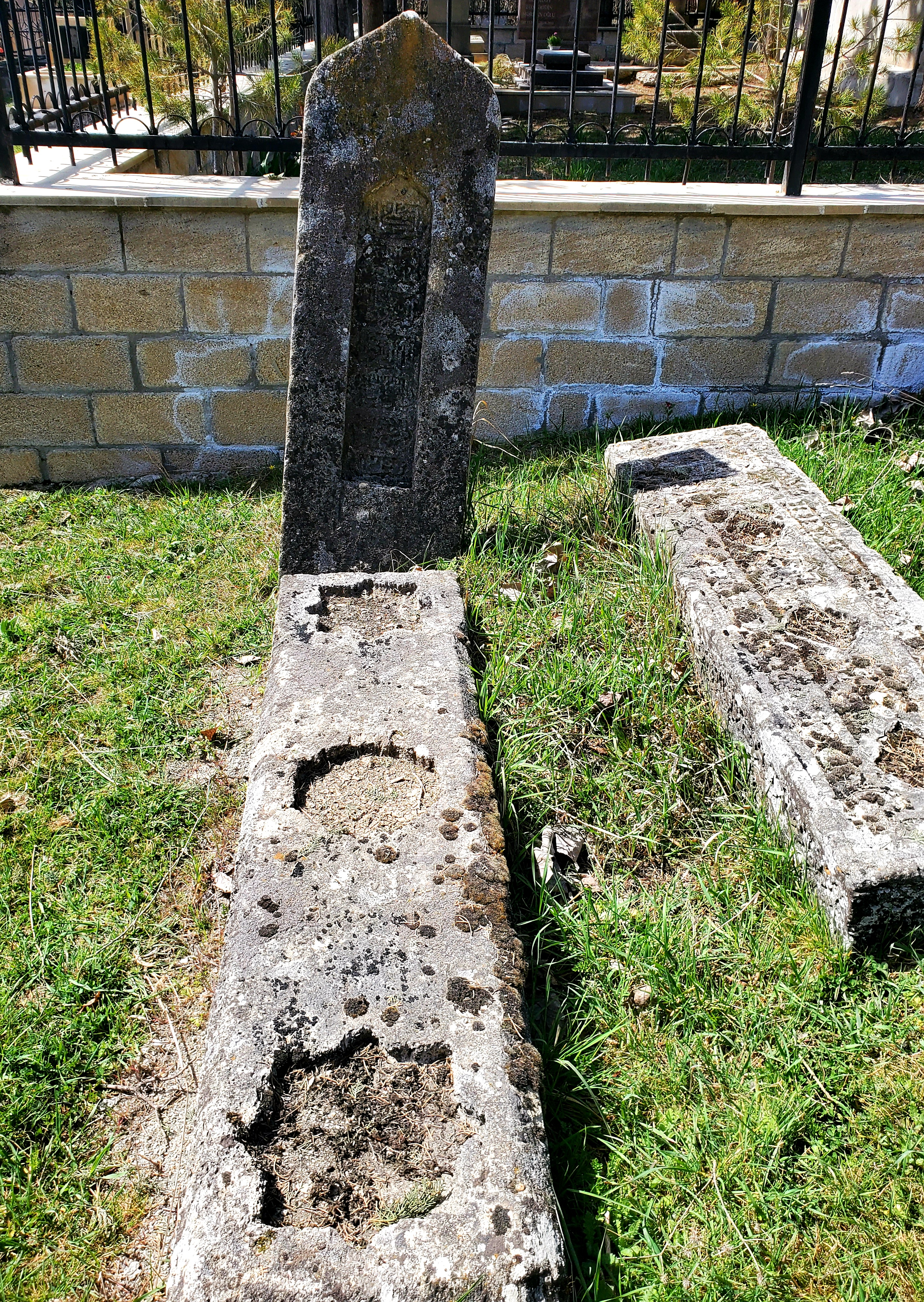

== See also ==
- Yeddi Gumbaz Mausoleum

== Literature ==
- Шахәндан // Azerbaijani Soviet Encyclopedia. Baku: Главная редакция Азербайджанской советской энциклопедии. 1987.
- Jiddi, Huseyn (1981). Средневековый город Шемахы (IX—XVII века) [The Medieval city of Shamakhi (IX-XVII centuries)] (in Russian). Baku: Elm.
