= Iegor Gran =

Russian-born French novelist

- In a 2024 interview
- Born: Iegor Andreyevich Siniavsky; 23 December 1964 (age 61); Moscow, Russia
- Education: École Centrale Paris
- Occupation: Businessman
- Spouse: Catherine Gran
- Parent(s): Andrei Sinyavsky; Maria Rozanova

Iegor Gran (born Iegor Andreyevich Siniavsky, 23 December 1964) is a Russian-born French novelist.

== Early life ==
Iegor Gran was born on 23 December 1964 in Moscow, Russia. His father, Andrei Sinyavsky, was a Russian writer and dissident who was jailed from 1964 to 1971. His mother, Maria Rozanova, was a publisher and an editor. His family moved to France in 1973, when he was nine years old. He graduated from the École Centrale Paris.

== Career ==
He published his first novel, Ipso facto, in 1998. He went on to write eleven more novels, some of which are critiques of political correctness. His twelfth novel, La Revanche de Kevin, is about a novelist who feels bad about being named Kevin.

He has written a bi-monthly column in Charlie Hebdo since 2011.

== Personal life ==
He is married to Catherine Gran, a painter. They live in Paris.

== Bibliography ==
- Ipso facto (Paris: Éditions P.O.L, 1998).
- Acné festival (Paris: P.O.L., 1999).
- Spécimen mâle (Paris: P.O.L., 2001).
- ONG ! (Paris: P.O.L., 2003).
- Le Truoc-Nog (Paris: P.O.L., 2003).
- Jeanne d'Arc fait tic-tac (Paris: P.O.L., 2005).
- Les Trois Vies de Lucie (Paris: P.O.L., 2006).
- Thriller (Paris: P.O.L., 2009).
- L’écologie en bas de chez moi (Paris: P.O.L., 2011).
- L'Ambition (Paris: P.O.L., 2013).
- Vilaines Pensées, Les Échappés (2014).
- La Revanche de Kevin (Paris: P.O.L., 2015).
- Le Retour de Russie (Paris: P.O.L, 2016).
- Écrire à l'élastique (Paris, P.O.L, 2017).
- Rêve plus vite, camarade ! L'industrie du slogan en URSS de 1918 à 1935 (Paris: Les Échappés, 2017).
- Les Services compétents (Paris: P.O.L, 2020).
- Ces casseroles qui applaudissent aux fenêtres (Paris: P.O.L, 2020)
- Le Journal d'Alix (Paris: P.O.L, 2022).
- Z Comme Zombie (Paris: P.O.L., 2022).
