= Michael Daniel (linguist) =

Russian linguist (born 1972)

- Born: 13 September 1972; Moscow

Academic background
- Education: Russian State University for the Humanities
- Thesis: (2000)
- Academic advisors: Vladimir Plungian, Aleksandr Barulin

Academic work
- Discipline: Linguist
- Main interests: linguistic typology, languages of Dagestan
- Website: Personal webpage

Michael Daniel (Russian: Михаил Aлександрович Даниэль; born 13 September 1972) is a linguist from Russia specializing in linguistic typology and the study of languages of Dagestan (Russia).

== Education and career ==
Daniel received his Candidate degree from the Russian State University for the Humanities in Moscow in 2001. He worked as an associate professor at Moscow State University and as a professor at HSE University. Since 2022, he has been a research fellow at the Collegium de Lyon.

== Scientific contributions ==
Daniel's contributions are primarily in the areas of linguistic typology and the study of the languages of Dagestan.

In the area of grammar, his contributions concern primarily the worldwide typology of grammatical number (e.g. Daniel & Moravcsik 2005; Acquaviva & Daniel 2022), the typology of personal pronouns (e.g. Daniel 2005), and the typology of case (e.g. Daniel & Ganenkov 2009).

For his dissertation on associative plurality, he won the Greenberg Award of the Association for Linguistic Typology.

== Personal life ==
Michael Daniel is the grandson of the well-known Soviet author Yuli Daniel.

== Selected works ==
=== Books ===
- Daniel, Michael & Dobrushina, Nina & Ganenkov, Dmitry (eds.). 2019. The Mehweb language: Essays on phonology, morphology and syntax. Berlin: Language Science Press.
- Acquaviva, Paolo & Daniel, Michael (eds.). 2022. Number in the world’s languages: A comparative handbook. Berlin: De Gruyter Mouton.

=== Selected articles ===
- Daniel, Michael. 2005. Plurality in independent personal pronouns. In Haspelmath, Martin & Dryer, Matthew S. & Gil, David & Comrie, Bernard (eds.), The World Atlas of Language Structures. Oxford: Oxford University Press.
- Daniel, Michael & Moravcsik, Edith A. 2005. The associative plural. In Haspelmath, Martin & Dryer, Matthew S. & Gil, David & Comrie, Bernard (eds.), The World Atlas of Language Structures. Oxford: Oxford University Press.
- Daniel, Michael & Ganenkov, Dmitrij. 2009. Case marking in Daghestanian. In Malchukov, Andrej & Spencer, Andrew (eds.), The Oxford Handbook on case, 668–685. Oxford: Oxford University Press.
- Daniel, Michael & Khalilova, Zaira & Molochieva, Zarina. 2010. Ditransitive constructions in East Caucasian: A family overview. In Malchukov, Andrej & Haspelmath, Martin & Comrie, Bernard (eds.), Studies in ditransitive constructions, 277–315. Berlin: De Gruyter Mouton.
- Daniel, Michael & Lander, Yury. 2011. The Caucasian languages. In Kortmann, Bernd & van der Auwera, Johan (eds.), The languages and linguistics of Europe: A comprehensive guide, 125–158. Berlin: De Gruyter Mouton.
- Daniel, Michael & Chechuro, Ilia & Verhees, Samira & Dobrushina, Nina. 2021. Lingua francas as lexical donors: Evidence from Daghestan. Language 97(3). 520–560. (doi:10.1353/lan.2021.0046)
- Acquaviva, Paolo & Daniel, Michael. 2022. Number in grammar: Results and perspectives. In Acquaviva, Paolo & Daniel, Michael (eds.), Number in the world's languages: A comparative handbook, 833–910. Berlin: De Gruyter Mouton. (doi:10.1515/9783110622713)
