= Maria Rozanova =

Soviet-era dissident and writer (1929–2023)

- Мария Васи́льевна Розанова
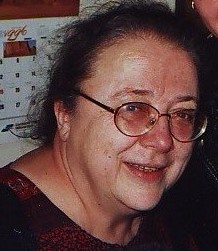
- Rozanova in 1994
- Born: Maria Vasilievna Kruglikova; 27 December 1929; Vitebsk, Byelorussian SSR, USSR
- Died: 13 December 2023 (aged 93); Fontenay-aux-Roses, France
- Education: Moscow State University
- Occupations: Writer, publisher of the Russian-language almanac Sintaksis
- Spouse: Andrei Sinyavsky
- Children: Iegor

Maria Vasilievna Rozanova (Russian: Мари́я Васи́льевна Ро́занова, Belarusian: Марыя Васільеўна Розанава, romanized: Maryja Vasiĺjeŭna Rozanava; née Kruglikova; 27 December 1929 – 13 December 2023) was a Russian publisher, editor, and Soviet-era dissident.

== Biography ==
Maria Vasilievna Rozanova was born on 27 December 1929 in Vitebsk. She graduated from the Moscow State University. In the Soviet Union, she worked as a tour guide and taught at the Gerasimov Institute of Cinematography and the Abramtsevo Art College. In 1973, following the release of her husband, writer Andrei Sinyavsky, from Soviet prison camps, the couple and their son, Iegor, left the USSR for Paris, France.

For many years, Rozanova served as the chief editor of Sintaksis, a literary journal. From 1977 to 1997 - publisher and co-editor, and later editor-in-chief of the Syntax magazine. She hosted the program "We Are Abroad" on Radio Liberty.

She died on 13 December 2023, at the age of 93.
