= Sintaksis =

Sintaksis: publitsistika, kritika, polemika (Russian: Синтаксис: публицистика, критика, полемика) was a journal published in Paris in 1978–2001 with Maria Rozanova as chief editor. A total of 37 issues of the journal were published before the journal was discontinued. According to Rozanova, there are no plans to resume publication.

The title of the publication references the samizdat poetry almanac Sintaksis edited by Alexander Ginzburg in 1959–1960.
