= Jurij A. Treguboff =

Russian writer

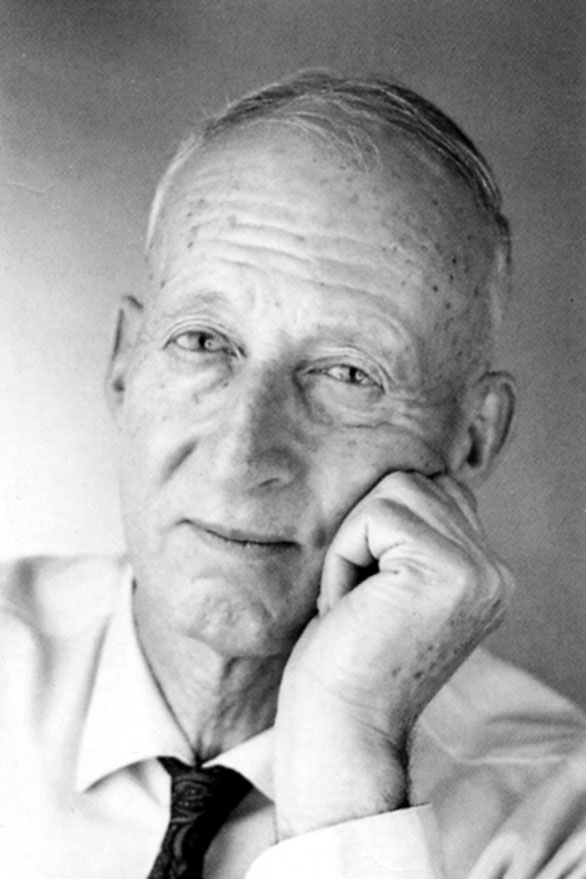
Jurij A. Treguboff

Jurij A. Treguboff (1913–2000) was a Soviet writer.

Media related to Jurij A. Treguboff at Wikimedia Commons
