= Mamlakat Nakhangova =

Mamlakat Akberdyevna Nakhangova
- Мамлакат Оқбердиевна Наҳангова
- Born: April 6, 1924; Shakhmansur, Uzbek SSR, Soviet Union
- Died: 2003 (aged 78-79); Dushanbe, Tajikistan
- Education: Candidate of philological sciences
- Alma mater: Dushanbe Pedagogical Institute
- Occupations: Scientist; Teacher
- Awards: Order of Lenin — No. 1327

Mamlakat Akberdyevna Nakhangova (Tajik: Мамлакат Оқбердиевна Наҳангова, Russian: Мамлака́т Акбердыевна Наха́нгова; 1924 — 2003) was a Soviet cotton picker, member of the Stakhanovite movement, and the youngest recipient of the Order of Lenin (1935).

During World War II she participated in a peace conference in London.

Nakhangova was a Soviet philologist, a candidate of philological sciences; and Associate Professor of the Tajik State Pedagogical University. From 1970-1977, she was the head of the department of foreign languages of the medical institute in Dushanbe.

She was the heroine Mirzo Tursunzoda's poem The Sun of the Country.

She was married and had two children, a daughter named Roxana and a son named Alisher.
