= Khizi =

Khizi Xızı
- City & Municipality
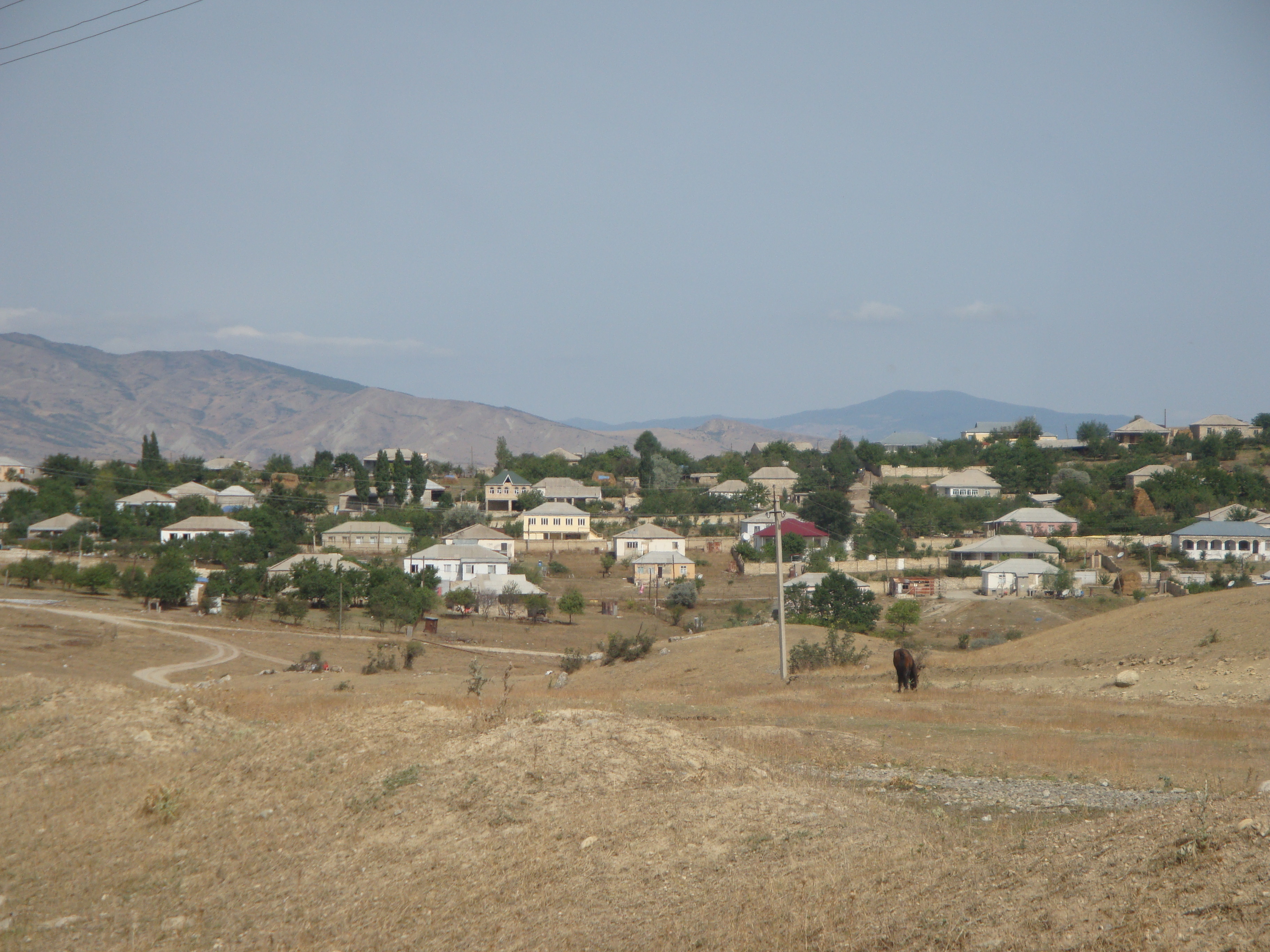

- Location within Azerbaijan
- Coordinates: 40°54′28″N 49°04′24″E
- Country: Azerbaijan
- District: Khizi

Population (2020)
  - Total: 1,600
- Time zone: UTC+4 (AZT)

Khizi (Azerbaijani: Xızı, Azerbaijani pronunciation: [xɯzɯ]) is the capital of the Khizi District of Azerbaijan. As of 2020, it has a population of 1,600.

The city of Khizi is located on the southern slope of the Greater Caucasus mountain range. However, the mountains located in the city are not high and the highest point is at an altitude of 958 meters above sea level - Mount Saraku and 2203 meters - Mount Dubrar. In several areas, the mountain slopes are used as winter pastures, while others are used as summer pastures.

== Notable natives ==
Some of the city's many prestigious residents include playwright Jafar Jabbarly, poets Mikayil Mushfig and Jabir Novruz, and wrestler Ashraf Aliyev.

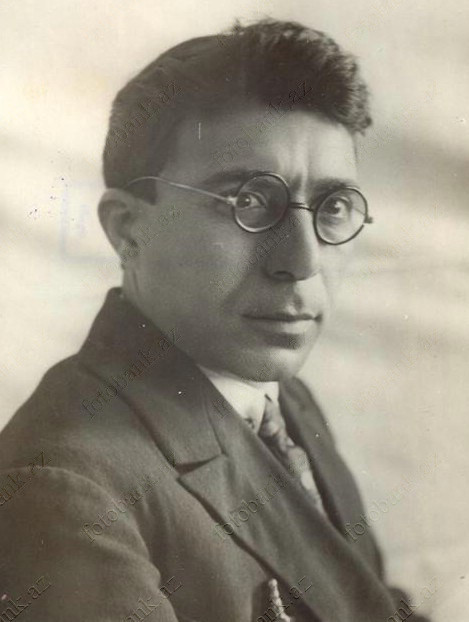
Jafar Jabbarly was known for founding screenwriting in Azerbaijan.
