= Deaths in December 2023 =

The following is a list of notable deaths in December 2023.

Entries for each day are listed alphabetically by surname. A typical entry lists information in the following sequence:

- Name, age, country of citizenship at birth, subsequent country of citizenship (if applicable), reason for notability, cause of death (if known), and reference.

== December 2023 ==
=== 1 ===
- Ezan Akélé, 85, Ivorian politician.
- Tony Allen, 78, English comedian and writer, co-founder of Alternative Cabaret.
- Burny Bos, 79, Dutch film producer (Miss Minoes, Mijn Franse tante Gazeuse), screenwriter and children's author, mesothelioma.
- Gérard Bramoullé, 78, French economist and politician.
- Shaun Davis, 57, British bodybuilder, Mr. Universe winner (1996). (death announced on this date)
- Leena de Silva, 87, Sri Lankan actress (Ganga Addara, Kaliyugaya, Awaragira).
- Bruce Dickson, 92, Canadian ice hockey player, Olympic champion (1952).
- Carissa Etienne, 71, Dominican physician, director of PAHO (2018–2023).
- Kiki Fatmala, 56, Indonesian actress (Pintu Hidayah), lung cancer.
- Brigit Forsyth, 83, Scottish actress (Whatever Happened to the Likely Lads?, Boon, Still Open All Hours).
- Heinz Gstrein, 81, Austrian-Swiss Oriental Orthodox theologian, foreign correspondent, and lecturer (University of Vienna).
- Douglas Gutwein, 75, American politician.
- Hamish Hardie, 95, British Olympic sailor (1948).
- Amira Hess, 80, Israeli poet, cancer.
- Joanne Hewson, 93, Canadian Olympic alpine skier (1952).
- Viktor Kalashnikov, 83, Russian politician, governor of Voronezh Oblast (1991–1992).
- Daniel Langlois, 66, Canadian computer graphics pioneer and businessman, founder of Excentris and Softimage.
- Michel Le Milinaire, 92, French football player (Laval) and manager (Rennes).
- Richard McKenzie, 93, American actor (It Takes Two, Being There, Corvette Summer).
- Sandra Day O'Connor, 93, American jurist, associate justice of the Supreme Court (1981–2006), member of the Arizona Senate (1969–1975) and chancellor of W&M (2005–2012), complications from dementia and respiratory illness.
- Charles Officer, 48, Canadian film director (Nurse.Fighter.Boy, Unarmed Verses, Akilla's Escape), screenwriter and actor.
- Winston Churchill Rea, 72, Northern Irish loyalist paramilitary commander.
- Lakhbir Singh Rode, 71, Indian Khalistani separatist, heart attack.
- Jerome K. Sherman, 98, American biologist.
- Lyle Elmer Strom, 98, American jurist, judge (since 1985) and chief judge (1987–1994) of the U.S. District Court for Nebraska.
- Vivi-Anne Wassdahl, 91, Swedish Olympic alpine skier (1956).
- Badar uz Zaman, 83, Pakistani classical singer.

=== 2 ===
- Medea Amiranashvili, 93, Georgian opera singer.
- Luís Araújo, 74, Portuguese military officer, chief of the general staff (2011–2014).
- Neville Callaghan, 77, Irish racehorse trainer.
- Maria Lisa Cinciari Rodano, 102, Italian politician, MP (1948–1972) and MEP (1979–1989).
- A. Deivanayagam, 88, Indian politician, Tamil Nadu MLA (1984–1989, 1991–2001).
- Felo García, 95, Costa Rican footballer (Deportivo Saprissa, Herediano, Hendon), painter, and architect.
- Roy Gerson, 64, American jazz pianist.
- Stanley Graham, 97, American psychologist, president of the American Psychological Association (1990).
- Walter Harms, 61, Paraguayan politician, deputy (since 2013), plane crash.
- Joe Hicks, 91, American baseball player (Chicago White Sox, Washington Senators, New York Mets).
- Wolfgang Hollegha, 94, Austrian painter.
- Clarence Kelly, 82, American sedevacantist traditionalist Catholic prelate, superior general of the Society of Saint Pius V (since 1983), cancer.
- V. Lakshmibai, 78, Indian mathematician.
- Maria Martin, 72, Mexican-American radio journalist (Latino USA), complications from surgery.
- Mike Maxfield, 79, English songwriter and guitarist (The Dakotas).
- Janet Panetta, 74, American dancer and choreographer, brain cancer.
- Roberto Pazzi, 77, Italian novelist and poet.
- Saulius Pečeliūnas, 67, Lithuanian politician, MP (1992–2000, 2004–2008) and signatory of the act of re-establishment.
- Edwin J. Peterson, 93, American jurist, justice (1979–1993) and chief justice (1983–1991) of the Oregon Supreme Court.
- Jean Ristat, 80, French poet and writer.
- Sufian Tayeh, 52, Palestinian scientist, president of the Islamic University of Gaza, airstrike.
- Faustin Twagiramungu, 78, Rwandan politician, prime minister (1994–1995).
- Jun Urbano, 84, Filipino actor (Magic Kingdom: Ang Alamat ng Damortis), film director and screenwriter (Juan Tamad at Mister Shooli: Mongolian Barbecue), ruptured abdominal aortic aneurysm.
- Concha Velasco, 84, Spanish actress (The Witching Hour, Esquilache, 32 Malasana Street), singer and television presenter.
- Ingrid Wigernæs, 95, Norwegian Olympic cross-country skier (1956, 1964).
- Edwin Wilson, 96, American theater critic (The Wall Street Journal).

=== 3 ===
- Avraham Avi-hai, 92, Israeli civil servant, journalist and author.
- Giuseppe Germano Bernardini, 95, Italian Roman Catholic prelate, archbishop of İzmir (1983–2004).
- Klaus Bernbacher, 92, German conductor.
- Chua Jui Meng, 80, Malaysian politician, minister of health (1995–2004) and MP (1986–2008), heart attack.
- Peter d'Hamecourt, 77, Dutch journalist and writer, heart attack.
- Thanga Darlong, 103, Indian folk musician.
- Claude Engle, 85, American electrical engineer.
- Malin Falkenmark, 98, Swedish hydrologist.
- Andrea Fay Friedman, 53, American actress (Life Goes On), complications from Alzheimer's disease.
- Léonard Gianadda, 88, Swiss journalist (TSR), engineer, and philanthropist, bone cancer.
- Gil Brother, 66, Brazilian humorist (Hermes & Renato), actor (Copa de Elite), and Internet personality, complications from prostate and bladder cancer.
- Gaetano Giuliano, 94, Italian politician, acting president of Sicily (1980).
- Myles Goodwyn, 75, Canadian musician (April Wine) and songwriter ("Tonite Is a Wonderful Time to Fall in Love", "Just Between You and Me").
- Major Hazelton, 80, American football player (Florida A&M, Chicago Bears, New Orleans Saints).
- Sigurður Helgason, 96, Icelandic mathematician.
- Elsi Hetemäki, 96, Finnish politician, MP (1970–1991).
- Kim Soo-yong, 94, South Korean film director (The Sea Village, Mist, The Land).
- Glenys Kinnock, Baroness Kinnock of Holyhead, 79, British politician, MEP (1994–2009), member of the House of Lords (2009–2021), and minister of state for Europe (2009), complications from Alzheimer's disease.
- Ma Sen, 91, Taiwanese playwright and literary critic.
- Terry Maple, 77, American ethologist.
- Doni Monardo, 60, Indonesian military officer, head of the NADC (2019–2021), commander of Kodam III/Siliwangi (2017–2018) and Kodam XVI/Pattimura (2015–2017), complications from a stroke.
- Jerome O'Neill, 77, American attorney, U.S. attorney for the District of Vermont (1981), cancer.
- Martin Patching, 65, English footballer (Wolverhampton Wanderers, Watford, Northampton Town).
- Santo Pezzutti, 101, Italian-American artist.
- Leontiy Sandulyak, 86, Ukrainian political figure, scientist, and diplomat.
- Yacouba Sawadogo, 77, Burkinabé farmer and agronomist.
- Lawrence Sifuna, 77, Kenyan politician, MP (1979–1988, 1992–1997).
- James Robert Slagle, 89, American computer scientist.
- Idrissa Traoré, 79, Burkinabé footballer.
- Valery Vishnichenko, 74, Kazakh politician, MP (2007–2011).

=== 4 ===
- Abang Abu Bakar, 82, Malaysian politician, MP (1982–1999).
- Peter R. Adam, 66, German film editor (An American Werewolf in Paris, Good Bye, Lenin!, Anonymous).
- Zdzisław Antolski, 70, Polish poet.
- Suren Babayan, 73, Armenian film director (The 13th Apostle) and actor.
- Juanita Castro, 90, Cuban political dissident.
- David Colander, 76, American economist.
- Gerald Comeau, 77, Canadian politician, MP (1984–1988) and senator (1990–2013), cancer.
- Lütfi Doğan, 93, Turkish theologian and politician, senator (1973–1980) and MP (1991–2002), president of the Diyanet (1968–1972).
- James L. Easton, 88, American businessman, philanthropist, and Hall of Fame archer, president of the World Archery Federation (1989–2005).
- Marius Frattini, 82, French rugby league player (Avignon, Entraigues, national team).
- Erol Madison Gwion, 59, Liberian politician, member of the House of Representatives (since 2021).
- Hadžem Hajdarević, 67, Bosnian writer.
- Grete Knudsen, 83, Norwegian politician, MP (1981–2001), minister of social affairs (1992–1994) and three-times of trade (1994–1997, 2000–2001).
- Sakari Knuuttila, 93, Finnish politician, MP (1966–1991).
- Queta Lavat, 94, Mexican actress (Las tandas del principal, Cruz de amor, Clase 406).
- Stefano Menicacci, 92, Italian politician, deputy (1968–1979).
- Peta Murphy, 50, Australian politician, MP (since 2019), breast cancer.
- Norman F. Ness, 90, American geophysicist.
- David Powell, 79, Welsh footballer (Wrexham, Sheffield United, national team).
- Vlado Pravdić, 73, Bosnian keyboardist (Bijelo Dugme).
- Suminda Sirisena, 75, Sri Lankan actor (Duhulu Malak, Saptha Kanya, Yakada Pihatu).
- Josef Vacenovský, 86, Czech footballer (Dukla Prague, Gent, Czechoslovakia national team).
- Volodia Vaisman, 85, Romanian-born French chess player.
- Edgar S. Woolard Jr., 89, American businessman (DuPont).

=== 5 ===
- Juan Pablo Adame, 38, Mexican politician, deputy (2012–2015), stomach cancer.
- Prince Constantin of Liechtenstein, 51, Liechtensteiner royal.
- Lionel Dahmer, 87, American chemist and writer (A Father's Story), heart attack.
- Richard J. Daschbach, 87, American politician, commissioner of the Federal Maritime Commission (1977–1982) and member of the New Hampshire House of Representatives (1986–1988).
- Mama Diabaté, 63, Guinean singer and musician.
- Paul Dibble, 80, New Zealand sculptor.
- Ron Fernandes, 72, American football player (Baltimore Colts).
- Jean Garnault, 98, French politician, mayor of Auxerre (1998–2001).
- Vojislav Govedarica, 82–83, Serbian-American actor (Rambo: First Blood Part II, Little Nikita, Lionheart). (death announced on this date)
- Mirush Kabashi, 75, Albanian actor.
- Denny Laine, 79, English Hall of Fame musician (Wings, The Moody Blues) and songwriter ("Mull of Kintyre"), interstitial lung disease.
- Norman Lear, 101, American Hall of Fame television writer and producer (All in the Family, Maude, The Jeffersons), cardiac arrest.
- Abdul Malik, 94, Bangladeshi cardiac surgeon, minister of health and family welfare (2001), national professor (since 2006).
- Lawrence Steven Meyers, 67, American actor (Dick Tracy, Battle Beyond the Stars) and film producer (Unfaithful).
- Kojiro Nakamura, 87, Japanese Islamic scholar, subdural hematoma.
- Dinesh Phadnis, 57, Indian actor (C.I.D., Sarfarosh, Super 30), liver damage.
- John Poston, 65, American politician, complications from amyotrophic lateral sclerosis.
- John Rumble, 90, Canadian equestrian, Olympic bronze medallist (1956).
- Rosemary Smith, 86, Irish rally driver, cancer.
- Ranjit Singh Talwandi, 67, Indian politician, Punjab MLA (2012–2017).
- Aatqall Taúaa, 74, Iraqi sculptor, film critic and novelist.
- Wolfgang Wieland, 75, German lawyer and politician, MP (2005–2013).

=== 6 ===
- Refaat Alareer, 44, Palestinian writer, professor and activist, airstrike.
- Tore Aleksandersen, 55, Norwegian volleyball coach (Allianz MTV Stuttgart, women's national team, Finland women's national team), prostate cancer.
- Joseph Bernardo, 94, French swimmer, Olympic bronze medallist (1948, 1952).
- Fran Bladel, 90, Australian politician, Tasmania MHA (1986–2002).
- Natalya Bogomolova, 83, Russian animator (Winnie-the-Pooh, The Blue Bird, Alice's Birthday).
- Alfredo Bonanno, 86, Italian anarchist.
- Ennio Candotti, 81, Italian-born Brazilian physicist and scientific leader.
- Dean Crawford, 65, Canadian rower, Olympic champion (1984).
- Cilly Dartell, 66, Dutch television presenter (Hart van Nederland) and actress, lung cancer.
- Vic Davalillo, 84, Venezuelan baseball player (Cleveland Indians, Pittsburgh Pirates, Los Angeles Dodgers).
- Emmanuelle Debever, 60, French actress (Danton, Sweet Inquest on Violence), drowned.
- Edmundo Desnoes, 93, Cuban writer.
- Amos Ettinger, 86, Israeli poet, songwriter, and radio presenter.
- Neville Hayes, 88, Australian rules footballer (Port Adelaide).
- Jack Hogan, 94, American actor (Combat!, The Bonnie Parker Story, Jake and the Fatman).
- Ellen Holly, 92, American actress (One Life to Live, School Daze, Cops and Robbers).
- Arve Johnsen, 89, Norwegian politician and industrial executive, chief executive of Statoil (1972–1987).
- Noël Kinsella, 84, Canadian politician, senator (1990–2014) and speaker of the Senate (2006–2014).
- Michael A. Knibb, 84, English biblical scholar.
- Mirosława Krajewska, 83, Polish actress (How to Be Loved, Brunet wieczorową porą).
- Illia Kyva, 46, Ukrainian politician, people's deputy (2019–2022), shot.
- Barbara Levick, 92, British historian and epigrapher.
- Marisa Pavan, 91, Italian actress (The Rose Tattoo, I Chose Love, Drum Beat).
- Richard Pilbrow, 90, British stage lighting designer, author and theatre design consultant.
- Michel Sardaby, 88, French jazz pianist.
- John Brooks Slaughter, 89, American electrical engineer (National Science Foundation).
- Michael H. Stone, 90, American forensic psychiatrist and writer, complications from a stroke.
- Jimmy Villotti, 79, Italian musician.
- Mike Wegener, 77, American baseball player (Montreal Expos), non-Hodgkin lymphoma.
- Dave Wehrmeister, 71, American baseball player (San Diego Padres, Chicago White Sox, Philadelphia Phillies).
- Kevin Wylie, 90, Australian footballer (Collingwood).
- Yang Ching-shun, 45, Taiwanese pool player, world champion (2001), cancer.
- Nur Yasin, 69, Indonesian politician, MP (2009–2014, since 2018).

=== 7 ===
- Bijan Allipour, 74, Iranian petroleum executive, chairman of NISOC (2014–2018).
- Ramón Ayala, 96, Argentine poet, singer and writer, pneumonia.
- Terry Baucom, 71, American bluegrass singer and banjo player (Russell Moore and IIIrd Tyme Out), Lewy body dementia.
- Pierre Berthelot, 80, French mathematician.
- Christopher Bulstrode, 72, British academic.
- Zita Carno, 88, American pianist.
- Lola Dee, 95, American singer.
- Aleksandr Dronov, 77, Russian chess grandmaster.
- Jacques Duquesne, 83, Belgian footballer (Olympic Charleroi, La Gantoise, national team).
- David Ellenson, 76, American rabbi and academic administrator, president of HUC-JIR (2001–2013, 2018).
- Bent Fuglede, 98, Danish mathematician.
- George Goninon, 96, Australian rules footballer (Geelong, Essendon).
- Hamka Haq, 71, Indonesian academician and politician, MP (2014–2019).
- Ann Hardy, 90, American computer programmer.
- Ernst Jansen Steur, 78, Dutch neurologist, pneumonia.
- Bob Jones, 72, American football player (Cincinnati Bengals, Atlanta Falcons).
- Thomas Kilroy, 89, Irish playwright and novelist (The Big Chapel).
- Jean-Claude Lecourieux, 66–67, French road racing cyclist.
- Ken Long, 70, American football player (Detroit Lions).
- Alan Longhurst, 98, British-born Canadian oceanographer.
- John McBeth, 79, New Zealand author and journalist.
- Jacqueline Mesmaeker, 93, Belgian plastic artist.
- Emiko Miyamoto, 86, Japanese volleyball player, Olympic champion (1964), sepsis.
- Vera Molnár, 99, Hungarian media artist.
- Gerhard Reber, 86, German organizational theorist and professor of management and organizational behavior (Johannes Kepler University of Linz).
- Stan Rogow, 75, American television producer (Lizzie McGuire, Flight 29 Down, Fame).
- Alberto Ruz Buenfil, 78, Mexican environmental activist.
- Sang Guowei, 82, Chinese pharmacologist and politician, vice chairperson of the SCNPC (2008–2013) and member of the Chinese Academy of Engineering.
- Guy Stern, 101, German-American intelligence officer (Ritchie Boys).
- Şükrü Yürür, 79, Turkish politician and economist, minister of industry and technology (1987–1991), MP (1983–2002).
- Benjamin Zephaniah, 65, British poet, writer (Face, Refugee Boy) and actor (Peaky Blinders), brain tumour.

=== 8 ===
- Clyde Butts, 66, Guyanese cricketer (West Indies), traffic collision.
- Itziar Castro, 46, Spanish actress (Locked Up, Skins, Champions), cardiac arrest.
- Michel Dovaz, 95, Swiss wine critic (Guide Hachette des Vins) and food writer.
- Frank Fiscalini, 101, American politician and educator.
- David Gell, 94, Canadian radio and television presenter.
- Carlos Jurado, 76, Uruguayan football player (national team) and manager (Cienciano, Tampico Madero), cardiac arrest.
- Richard Kerr, 78, English singer, songwriter ("Brandy", "I'll Never Love This Way Again", "Looks Like We Made It") and composer.
- Peter-Michael Kolbe, 70, German rower, Olympic silver medalist (1976, 1984, 1988).
- Leelavathi, 86, Indian actress (Bhakta Kumbara, Mana Mecchida Madadi, Santha Thukaram).
- Charles A. Legge, 93, American jurist, judge (1984–2001) and of the U.S. District Court for Northern California.
- Jack Martin, 83, Canadian ice hockey player (Toronto Maple Leafs).
- Marlene McDonald, 64, Trinidadian politician, MP (2007-2020)
- Junior Mehmood, 67, Indian actor (Johar Mehmood in Hong Kong, Mohabbat Ke Dushman, Ramgarh Ke Sholay) and singer, stomach cancer.
- Luigi Milan, 85, Italian footballer (Fiorentina, Atalanta) and manager (Olbia).
- Jean-Pierre Moulin, 101, Swiss journalist (Le Matin), writer and author.
- Ryan O'Neal, 82, American actor (Love Story, Barry Lyndon, Paper Moon) and boxer, congestive heart failure.
- Pino Pagani, 86, Italian radio host and journalist, cancer.
- Kanam Rajendran, 73, Indian politician, Kerala MLA (1982–1991), heart attack.
- Alan Raph, 90, American trombonist, composer and arranger, traffic collision.
- Mohan Singh Rawat, Indian politician, Uttarakhand MLA.
- Joe Solomon, 93, Guyanese cricketer (West Indies).
- Speightstown, 25, American Thoroughbred racehorse, euthanized.
- Tony Tarantino, 83, American actor (It's the Rage) and producer.
- Len Templar, 92, Australian rules footballer (North Melbourne).
- Yayu Unru, 61, Indonesian actor (Lovely Man, Night Bus, Posesif) and acting coach.
- Paul Unruh, 95, American college basketball player (Bradley Braves).
- Paul Webb, 94, American college basketball coach (Randolph–Macon Yellow Jackets, Old Dominion Monarchs).
- Wei Jinshan, 96, Chinese vice admiral, political commissioner of PLAN (1990–1993), and deputy (1978–1983).

=== 9 ===
- Rehmat Shah Afridi, 74, Pakistani journalist (The Frontier Post).
- Gene Aubry, 88, American architect.
- Edward Baugh, 87, Jamaican poet and scholar.
- George Getzel Cohen, 96, South African-Australian radiologist.
- Paul F. Crowley, 89, American politician, member of the Pennsylvania House of Representatives (1969–1972).
- Mort Engelberg, 86, American film producer (Smokey and the Bandit) and advance man (Walter Mondale 1984 presidential campaign, Bill Clinton 1992 presidential campaign).
- Larisa Gershtein, 72, Soviet-born Israeli politician, deputy mayor of Jerusalem (1993–2003).
- Raymond E. Goedert, 96, American Roman Catholic prelate, auxiliary bishop of Chicago (1991–2003).
- Dærick Gröss Sr., 76, American illustrator (The Guide to Getting it On) and writer, cancer.
- Maxim Gustik, 35, Belarusian Olympic freestyle skier (2018, 2022), traffic collision.
- Mary Ann Handley, 87, American politician, member of the Connecticut State Senate (1997–2011).
- Thomas Haug, 96, Norwegian-Swedish electrical engineer.
- Jim Heighton, 79, Canadian football player (Winnipeg Blue Bombers, Hamilton Tiger-Cats, Montreal Alouettes), complications from dementia.
- Mainul Hosein, 83, Bangladeshi lawyer and politician, MP (1973–1975), cancer.
- Walter Leiser, 92, Swiss rower, Olympic silver medalist (1952).
- Willie McCulloch, 75, Scottish football player (Alloa Athletic, Airdrieonians) and manager (Cowdenbeath).
- Hartland Monahan, 72, Canadian ice hockey player (Washington Capitals, St. Louis Blues, Los Angeles Kings).
- Carles Soler Perdigó, 91, Spanish Roman Catholic prelate, auxiliary bishop of Barcelona (1991–2001) and bishop of Girona (2001–2008).
- Graham Petrie, 83, Scottish-Canadian author and academic.
- Kenneth Ringsrød, 54, Norwegian footballer (Sarpsborg, Kongsvinger, Fredrikstad).
- Reiner Stenzel, 84, German-born American plasma physicist.
- Mike Urquhart, 65, Canadian-British Hall of Fame ice hockey player (Kamloops Chiefs, Nottingham Panthers, Chelmsford Chieftains).
- Gordon Vejprava, 90, Canadian ice hockey player (Cleveland Barons, Providence Reds).
- Charlie Wallace, 75, American basketball player.
- Frank Wycheck, 52, American football player (Washington Redskins, Houston / Tennessee Oilers / Titans), complications from a fall.

=== 10 ===
- Michel Bertraneu, 74, French Olympic equestrian (1984).
- Michael Blakemore, 95, Australian theatre director.
- Philip Bushill-Matthews, 80, British businessman and politician, MEP (1999–2009).
- Julian Carroll, 92, American politician, governor (1974–1979) and lieutenant governor (1971–1974) of Kentucky, member of the Kentucky Senate (2005–2021).
- Chen Lip Keong, 75, Malaysian gambling industry executive, founder of NagaCorp.
- Michael L. Cowan, 78, American navy admiral.
- David Drake, 78, American writer (Hammer's Slammers, RCN Series).
- James P. Dunleavy, 84, American politician.
- Shirley Anne Field, 87, English actress (The Entertainer, The Damned, Alfie).
- Gao Yaojie, 95, Chinese gynecologist and dissident.
- Barbara Iglewski, 85, American microbiologist.
- Jonathan Irwin, 82, British-Irish auctioneer and philanthropist.
- Orland Lindsay, 95, Antiguan Anglican clergyman, bishop of Antigua and archbishop of the West Indies (1970–1996).
- Graziella Magherini, 96, Italian psychiatrist (Stendhal syndrome).
- Edna Mazia, 74, Israeli playwright.
- Bill McCarthy, 87, Irish hurler and Gaelic footballer.
- Syd Millar, 89, Northern Irish rugby union player (Ballymena, Ireland national team), coach (British & Irish Lions), and executive, chairman of the IRB (2003–2007).
- Theo Öhlinger, 84, Austrian constitutional scholar and educator.
- Mariya Pisareva, 90, Russian athlete, Olympic silver medallist (1956).
- James L. Robertson, 83, American jurist, justice of the Supreme Court of Mississippi (1983–1992).
- Melker Schörling, 76, Swedish businessman.
- Cliff Simpson, 95, New Zealand middle-distance runner.
- Bert Stenfeldt, 90, Swedish Air Force officer.
- Chuck Stern, 44, American composer, musician (Time of Orchids), and writer.
- Mark Villiger, 73, Swiss judge, justice of the European Court of Human Rights (2006–2015).
- Norby Walters, 91, American music and sports agent.

=== 11 ===
- Shūji Abe, 74, Japanese film producer (Godzilla Minus One, The Eternal Zero, Bayside Shakedown 2).
- Mahlon Apgar IV, 82, American government and business consultant, cancer.
- Andre Braugher, 61, American actor (Homicide: Life on the Street, Brooklyn Nine-Nine, Glory), Emmy winner (1998, 2006), lung cancer.
- Ivan Čeliković, 34, Croatian footballer (NK Konavljanin, Inter Zaprešić, Lokomotiva).
- Alain Chartrand, 77, Canadian film director (Ding et Dong) and screenwriter.
- Paul Chevigny, 88, American lawyer and author.
- Kathy Chow, 57, Hong Kong actress (Time Before Time, E.U., The Breaking Point) and singer, lupus.
- Phil Cooley, 72, Australian rugby league referee.
- Jeffrey Foskett, 67, American singer, songwriter, and producer (The Beach Boys), thyroid cancer.
- Ian Gibson, 77, British comic book artist (2000 AD, Judge Dredd, The Ballad of Halo Jones), cancer.
- Kenny Graham, 82, American football player (San Diego Chargers, Cincinnati Bengals, Pittsburgh Steelers).
- Abdelhafid Kadiri, 96, Moroccan politician,.
- Ferdinand Keller, 77, German footballer (TSV 1860 Munich, Hannover 96, West Germany national team).
- Ken Kelsch, 76, American cinematographer (Bad Lieutenant, The Driller Killer, Big Night), COVID-19 and pneumonia.
- Osamu Kido, 73, Japanese professional wrestler (NJPW, UWF), cancer.
- Randy Legge, 77, Canadian ice hockey player (New York Rangers, Winnipeg Jets).
- Essra Mohawk, 75, American singer-songwriter (Primordial Lovers, "Change of Heart").
- Paulin Obame-Nguema, 88, Gabonese politician, prime minister (1994–1999).
- Jim Paronto, 80, American football player and coach (Adams State Grizzlies).
- Edgar Quinteros, 83, Bolivian footballer (national team).
- Renée, 94, New Zealand feminist writer and playwright (Wednesday to Come, Pass It On).
- Eduard Rius, 70, Spanish physician, minister of health and social assistance of Catalonia (1996–2002) and member of the Catalan parliament (1996–2003).
- Ahmad Salim, 78, Pakistani poet and literary scholar.
- John "Rambo" Stevens, 66, English music producer and manager, aortic dissection.
- Camden Toy, 68, American actor (The Bay, Buffy the Vampire Slayer, ChromeSkull: Laid to Rest 2) and film editor, pancreatic cancer.
- Frank Twomey, 68, Irish children's television entertainer (Bosco, Bull Island).
- Zahara, 36, South African singer ("Phendula", "Loliwe"), liver disease.

=== 12 ===
- Bob Allen, 86, American baseball player (Cleveland Indians).
- Johari Amini, 88, American author and poet.
- Babken Ararktsyan, 79, Armenian politician, president of the National Assembly (1995–1998) and chairman of the Supreme Council (1991–1995).
- Jean-François Bach, 83, French medical professor, biologist and immunologist.
- Shirley Barber, 88, English author.
- Yevgeny Belousov, 61, Russian luger, Olympic silver medallist (1984).
- Yitzhak Ben-Bashat, 44, Israeli IDF officer (Yiftach Brigade, Paran Brigade), killed in action.
- Ama Bame Busia, 87, Ghanaian politician, member of the Council of State (2001–2009).
- William G. Connolly, 86, American newspaper editor (The New York Times), complications from a fall.
- Jakob Margido Esp, 80, Norwegian actor and writer.
- Richard Gaddes, 81, English arts administrator (Santa Fe Opera, Opera Theater of St. Louis).
- Hiroshi Hasegawa, 89, Japanese Grand Prix motorcycle racer.
- Zurab Karumidze, 66, Georgian writer (Dagny, or a Love Feast) and culturologist.
- Adriano Marques de Magallanes, 98, Spanish businessman, diplomat and politician, deputy (1986–1989) and senator (1998–2000).
- Larry Miggins, 98, American baseball player (St. Louis Cardinals).
- Kostas Nestoridis, 93, Greek football player (AEK Athens, national team) and manager (Paniliakos).
- Ole Paus, 76, Norwegian singer ("Innerst i sjelen", "Mitt lille land") and songwriter.
- J. G. A. Pocock, 99, New Zealand historian of political thought.
- Albert Stone, 95, American businessman and philanthropist.
- Mario Valdemarin, 96, Italian actor (Hercules and the Conquest of Atlantis, Sandokan the Great, The End of the Night), COVID-19.
- Craig Watkins, 56, American lawyer and politician, district attorney for Dallas County, Texas (2007–2015).

=== 13 ===
- Charlie Allan, 84, Scottish farmer, athlete and economist.
- Yılmaz Atadeniz, 91, Turkish film director (Killing in Istanbul, The Deathless Devil), producer (A Season in Hakkari) and screenwriter, COVID-19.
- Hermann Brede, 100, German architect.
- Bill Burgess, 82, American football player (Auburn Tigers) and coach (Jacksonville State).
- Gene Carr, 72, Canadian ice hockey player (New York Rangers, Los Angeles Kings, St. Louis Blues).
- Anda Caropol, 84, Romanian actress (The Snails' Senator).
- Kenny DeForest, 37, American comedian, traffic collision.
- Julia Gentleman, 92, American politician, member of the Iowa State House of Representatives (1975–1979) and Iowa State Senate (1979–1991).
- Wolfgang Glück, 94, Austrian film director and screenwriter (Endangered Girls, The Count of Luxemburg, '38 – Vienna Before the Fall).
- Peter Godsoe, 85, Canadian banker, CEO of Scotiabank (1992–2003).
- Mike Grgich, 100, Croatian-American winemaker.
- Ernő Gubányi, 73, Hungarian Olympic handball player (1976, 1980).
- Antonio Juliano, 80, Italian footballer (Napoli, Bologna, national team).
- Steve Junker, 88, American football player (Detroit Lions, Washington Redskins).
- Lech Konopiński, 92, Polish poet and writer.
- K. Kunhiraman, 80, Indian politician, Kerala MLA (2006–2016).
- Wojciech Łazarek, 86, Polish footballer (ŁKS Łódź, Lechia Gdańsk) and football manager (Lech Poznań).
- Paul Litjens, 76, Dutch Olympic field hockey player (1972, 1976).
- Wilf Lunn, 81, British inventor, prop maker and TV presenter (Vision On).
- Roger McMurrin, 84, American conductor and pastor.
- Zofia Merle, 85, Polish actress (The Codes, Nights and Days, Chopin: Desire for Love).
- Ted Morgan, 91, French-American historian, complications from dementia.
- Verica Nedeljković, 94, Serbian chess player.
- Ann Newdigate, 89, South African-born Canadian fibre artist.
- Maâmar Ousser, 88, Algerian footballer (USM Blida).
- Geraldine Peten, 75, American politician, member of the Arizona House of Representatives (2017–2021).
- Ram Prakash, 84, Indian politician, MP (2007–2014) and Haryana MLA (1991–1996).
- Arfanul Haque Rifat, 65, Bangladeshi politician, mayor of Cumilla (since 2022).
- Maria Rozanova, 93, Russian publisher, editor (Sintaksis), and political dissident.
- Derek Stirling, 62, New Zealand cricketer (Central Districts, Wellington, national team), cancer.
- Dick Tommel, 81, Dutch politician, MP (1981–1994).
- Ramón Enrique Torres, 71, Puerto Rican journalist and news anchor (Las Noticias, Tu Mañana), throat cancer.
- John Wade, 95, American Olympic rower (1948).
- Wolfram Waibel Sr., 76, Austrian five-time Olympic sports shooter.
- Des White, 96, New Zealand Hall of Fame rugby league player (Auckland, national team) and coach.
- Margaret Whiting, 90, British actress (Sinbad and the Eye of the Tiger, The Secret Garden, The Password Is Courage).

=== 14 ===
- Selma Archerd, 98, American actress (Die Hard, Lethal Weapon, Melrose Place).
- Qapik Attagutsiak, 103, Canadian Inuit World War II war effort contributor.
- Cari Beauchamp, 74, American author, journalist, and documentary filmmaker.
- Clyde Berry, 92, American football and baseball player and coach (Henderson State).
- Hasan Bitmez, 53, Turkish politician, MP (since 2023), complications from a heart attack.
- Curt Brunnée, 95, German physicist.
- Chen Wen-hui, 80, Taiwanese educator and politician, member of the Legislative Yuan (1996–1999), liver cancer.
- Betty Cooper Hearnes, 96, American politician, first lady of Missouri (1965–1973) and member of the Missouri House of Representatives (1979–1989).
- Ghislain de Diesbach, 92, French writer and biographer.
- Willie Dunne, 90, Irish Olympic runner.
- Chukwuemeka Ezeife, 86, Nigerian politician, governor of Anambra State (1992–1993).
- Rudolf Hrubý, 69, Slovak businessman (ESET), president of HC Slovan Bratislava, stroke.
- Tomáš Janovic, 86, Slovak writer, playwright and poet.
- Allen Kerr, 97, Scottish-born Australian biologist.
- Lance Kinder, 88, British tennis player.
- Liu Ho-chien, 97, Taiwanese admiral, commander of the navy (1983–1988) and chief of the general staff (1991–1995).
- Ken MacKenzie, 89, Canadian baseball player (Milwaukee Braves, New York Mets, St. Louis Cardinals).
- Hanzala Malik, 67, Scottish politician, MSP (2011–2016). (death announced on this date)
- George McGinnis, 73, American Hall of Fame basketball player (Indiana Pacers, Philadelphia 76ers, Denver Nuggets), complications from cardiac arrest.
- Gus Morrison, 88, American politician, mayor of Fremont, California (1985–1989, 1994–2004, 2012–2013).
- Yevgeniy Perventsev, 97, Russian government official, head of the KGB of the Tajik SSR (1975–1985).
- Lee Redmond, 82, American world record holder, longest fingernails on both hands.
- Ra. Sankaran, 92, Indian film director (Then Sindhudhe Vaanam) and actor (Mouna Ragam, Pondatti Thevai).
- James Templer, 87, British Olympic equestrian (1964) and army officer, complications of Alzheimer's disease.
- Amerigo Thodé, 73, Curaçaoan politician, president of the Parliament (2012, 2017).
- Marge Villa, 98, American baseball player (Kenosha Comets).
- Howard Weaver, 73, American journalist and newspaper executive (McClatchy), Pulitzer Prize winner (1976, 1989), pancreatic cancer.
- Yehuda Yannay, 86, Israeli composer.

=== 15 ===
- Samer Abu Daqqa, 46, Palestinian-Belgian video journalist, airstrike.
- Jim Ashmore, 88, American basketball player (Mississippi State Bulldogs).
- Abdulaziz Al-Babtain, 87, Kuwaiti poet.
- Sir Tim Brighouse, 83, British educator.
- Anup Ghoshal, 78, Indian playback singer and film composer (Sagina Mahato).
- Steve Halliwell, 77, English actor (Emmerdale, Coronation Street) and singer (The Woolpackers).
- Bob Johnson, 79, British guitarist, singer and songwriter (Steeleye Span).
- Sherryl Jordan, 74, New Zealand writer (Winter of Fire).
- Guy Marchand, 86, French actor (Coup de Torchon, Family Business, My New Partner II), musician and singer.
- Bruno Santon, 81, Italian footballer (Venezia, Livorno, Lucchese).
- Hans Selander, 78, Swedish football player (Helsingborg, national team) and manager (Falkenberg).
- Tang Xiao'ou, 55, Chinese computer scientist, founder of SenseTime.
- Hannu Vaahtoranta, 80, Finnish Olympic swimmer (1964).
- K. P. Viswanathan, 83, Indian politician.

=== 16 ===
- Óscar Agudelo, 91, Colombian musician, complications from Parkinson's and Alzheimer's diseases.
- Sailakshmi Balijepally, 48, Indian paediatrician.
- Colin Burgess, 77, Australian rock drummer (The Masters Apprentices, AC/DC).
- Peter Bush, 93, New Zealand photographer and sportswriter (The New Zealand Herald).
- Ann Elizabeth Carson, 94, Canadian poet.
- Jayanta Das, 54, Indian actor (Raamdhenu, Kanyadaan, Bharaghar), liver disease.
- Beatriz Abril de Leal, 84, Colombian politician and lawyer, governor of Meta Department (1983–1984).
- Larry V. Faircloth, 75, American politician, member of the West Virginia House of Delegates (1980–2012).
- Joseph Finnegan, 81, Irish jurist, judge (1999–2006) and president (2001–2006) of the High Court, judge of the Supreme Court (2006–2012).
- Rolando Garbey, 76, Cuban boxer, Olympic silver medalist (1968), amateur world champion (1974), cardiac arrest.
- Richard Hunt, 88, American sculptor (A Bridge Across and Beyond, Wing Generator, Build-Grow).
- Scott Lautenbaugh, 59, American politician, member of the Nebraska Legislature (2007–2014).
- Sebastiano Lo Monaco, 65, Italian actor (La piovra, I Viceré, Where Are You? I'm Here).
- Carlos Lyra, 90, Brazilian singer and composer ("Maria Ninguém").
- Mike McRae, 68, American Olympic long jumper.
- Nawaf Al-Ahmad Al-Jaber Al-Sabah, 86, Kuwaiti royal, emir (since 2020).
- Antonio Negri, 90, Italian philosopher (Empire) and politician, deputy (1983–1987) and founder of Potere Operaio.
- Rosita Pelayo, 64, Mexican actress (Las amazonas, Salomé, Sortilegio), colon cancer.
- Bert Peletier, 86, Dutch mathematician.
- Lorenzo Riva, 85, Italian fashion designer.
- Oleg Ryakhovskiy, 90, Russian triple jumper.
- Kenpachiro Satsuma, 76, Japanese actor (Godzilla vs. Hedorah, The Return of Godzilla, Godzilla vs. Destoroyah) and stuntman, pneumonia.
- Mathieu Segers, 47, Dutch historian, colorectal cancer.
- Bernd Siebert, 74, German politician, MP (1994–2009, 2010–2017, 2020–2021).
- Gyula Szabó Nagy, 79, Hungarian Olympic boxer (1968).
- Theodore Y. Wu, 99, Chinese-born American engineer.

=== 17 ===
- José Luis Abellán, 90, Spanish philosopher.
- John Ashford, 79, British theatre director (The Place, London), prostate cancer.
- Norma Barzman, 103, American screenwriter (Finishing School, The Locket, Never Say Goodbye).
- John Biehl, 84, Chilean lawyer, political scientist, and diplomat, minister secretary-general of the Presidency (1998–1999).
- Florence de la Courtie-Billat, 88, French tennis player.
- Linda van Dyck, 75, Dutch actress (10:32, A Gangstergirl, De grens).
- Amp Fiddler, 65, American musician (Enchantment, Parliament, Funkadelic), composer, and record producer.
- Gurdev Singh Gill, 92, Indian-born Canadian physician.
- Otar Iosseliani, 89, Georgian film director and screenwriter (Pastorale, Favorites of the Moon, Monday Morning).
- Reggie Lacefield, 78, American basketball player (Kentucky Colonels, Wilmington Blue Bombers).
- Jim Ladd, 75, American disc jockey (KMET, KLOS, SiriusXM), radio producer and writer, heart attack.
- Hwa-Wei Lee, 92, Chinese-born American librarian.
- Kuntoro Mangkusubroto, 76, Indonesian politician, minister of energy and mineral resources (1998–1999).
- Philippe Martin, 57, French economist, chairman of the Conseil d'Analyse Économique (2008–2012).
- James McCaffrey, 65, American actor (Max Payne, Rescue Me, Viper), multiple myeloma.
- Eric Montross, 52, American basketball player (North Carolina Tar Heels, Boston Celtics, Detroit Pistons), cancer.
- Nikola Padevsky, 90, Bulgarian chess grandmaster.
- Camillus Perera, 84, Sri Lankan cartoonist.
- Roy Roebuck, 94, British journalist (News Chronicle, Daily Express) and politician, MP (1966–1970).
- Oleg Rukhlevich, 49, Belarusian Olympic swimmer (1996, 2000).
- Sam Silas, 83, American football player (St. Louis Cardinals, San Francisco 49ers, New York Giants).
- Maureen Flavin Sweeney, 100, Irish postmistress.
- Terao Tsunefumi, 60, Japanese sumo wrestler.
- Ronaldo Valdez, 76, Filipino actor (The Mad Doctor of Blood Island, Karma, Cedie), suicide by gunshot.
- Robert Wahl, 96, American football player (Michigan Wolverines, Chicago Bears).
- Lionel Wickrama, 77, Sri Lankan actor (Sanda Yahanata, Mathu Yam Dawasa, Sangili).

=== 18 ===
- Sulaiman Abdullah, 77, Malaysian lawyer.
- Giovanni Anselmo, 89, Italian visual artist.
- Sir Norman Arthur, 92, British military officer and Olympic equestrian (1960), GOC Scotland (1985–1988) and Lord Lieutenant of Kirkcudbright (1996–2006).
- Ronnie Caryl, 70, English guitarist (Flaming Youth, Phil Collins).
- Olive Clarke, 101, English farmer.
- Irwin Cohen, 90, American real estate developer.
- Bronislovas Genzelis, 89, Lithuanian politician, MP (1992–1996) and signatory of the Act of Re-Establishment.
- John Godfrey, 81, Canadian politician, MP (1993–2008).
- Dan Greenburg, 87, American writer (How to Be a Jewish Mother, The Zack Files, Maximum Boy), complications from a stroke.
- Jaakko Hämeen-Anttila, 60, Finnish Islamic scholar.
- Dmitry Krasilov, 29, Russian dancer (Little Big), endocrinopathy.
- Valery Lagunov, 81, Russian ballet dancer and choreographer.
- Lao Rongzhi, 48, Chinese serial killer, executed.
- Bo Larsson, 79, Swedish footballer (Malmö, VfB Stuttgart, national team).
- David Maxwell, 72, British rower, Olympic silver medalist (1976).
- Arno J. Mayer, 97, Luxembourgish-born American historian.
- Abderrahim Ouakili, 53, Moroccan footballer (Mainz 05, Karlsruher SC, national team).
- Susanna Parigi, 62, Italian singer-songwriter and pianist.
- Lewis Pragasam, 66, Malaysian jazz fusion drummer, heart attack.
- Brian Price, 86, Welsh rugby union player (Newport, British Lions, national team).

=== 19 ===
- Ed Budde, 83, American football player (Kansas City Chiefs).
- Andy Clements, 68, English footballer (York City, Bolton Wanderers, Port Vale).
- Frank Collazo Jr., 92, American politician, member of the Texas House of Representatives (1977–1993).
- Darryl Cowie, 62, Australian footballer (Central Districts, St Kilda, South Australia).
- Giulio De Stefano, 94, Italian sailor, Olympic bronze medallist (1960).
- Mark Elvin, 85, Australian Sinologist.
- Oliver Emanuel, 43, English playwright and radio dramatist, brain cancer.
- Gunther Emmerlich, 79, German operatic bass and television presenter.
- Bruce Gilberd, 85, New Zealand Anglican clergyman, bishop of Auckland (1985–1994).
- V. Mohini Giri, 85, Indian social worker, chairperson of the National Commission for Women (1995–1998).
- Janusz Gortat, 75, Polish boxer, Olympic bronze medallist (1972, 1976).
- Lyda Green, 85, American politician, member (1995–2009) and president (2007–2009) of the Alaska Senate.
- Edith Hemenway, 96, American composer and pianist.
- Charles H. Holbrow, 88, American physicist.
- Bram Inscore, 41, American musician, songwriter ("Youth", "Don't Give Up on Me") and producer, suicide.
- Jiang Ping, 93, Chinese legal scholar, president of the CUPL (1988–1990).
- Boro Jovanović, 84, Croatian tennis player.
- Stefan Olszowski, 92, Polish politician, minister of foreign affairs (1971–1976, 1982–1985).
- K. M. Peyton, 94, British author (Flambards, Fly-by-Night, Pennington's Seventeenth Summer).
- Joseph Henry Smith, 78, Ghanaian military officer and diplomat, minister for defence (2009–2013) and chief of army staff (1996–2001).
- Bryan Thomas, 95, English architect.
- Karl Volkmer, 101, Swiss Olympic sprinter (1948).

=== 20 ===
- Dennis Avoth, 76, Welsh boxer.
- Andrea Barberi, 44, Italian sprinter.
- Carl Barzilauskas, 72, American football player (New York Jets, Green Bay Packers).
- Mohammad Youssef Beydoun, 92, Lebanese politician.
- Antonio Burgos, 80, Spanish journalist, novelist, and multi-media writer.
- Franco Cozzo, 88, Italian-Australian businessman.
- Khadijo Mohamed Diriye, 74, Somali politician, minister for women and human rights (2014–2015) and youth and sports (2017–2020).
- Johnny Flaherty, 74, Irish hurler (Kinnitty, Offaly).
- Philip H. Hayes, 83, American politician, member of the U.S. House of Representatives (1975–1977) and Indiana Senate (1970–1974).
- Tambusamy Krishnan, 79, Malaysian Olympic sprinter (1972).
- James Kelsey McConica, 93, Canadian Roman Catholic priest and academic.
- Eric Moyo, 41, Zimbabwean gospel singer, brain bleed.
- Jeff Oaks, 59, American poet and essayist.
- Yıldıray Pağda, 85, Turkish Olympic athlete (1960). (death announced on this date)
- Pat Quartermain, 86, English footballer (Oxford United, Cambridge United).
- Atiqur Rahman, 92, Bangladeshi lieutenant general, chief of army staff (1986–1990) and director general of Bangladesh Rifles (1977–1982), heart attack.
- Frank Riggs, 73, American politician and charter school executive, member of the U.S. House of Representatives (1991–1993, 1995–1999).
- Harrie Smeets, 63, Dutch Roman Catholic prelate, bishop of Roermond (2018–2023), brain tumour.
- Torben Ulrich, 95, Danish tennis player, writer and musician.

=== 21 ===
- Carmen Barros, 98, Chilean actress (La Fiebre del Loco, The Guest), singer and theatre director.
- David Donachie, 79, British historical novelist, cancer.
- Martin Feeley, 73, Irish Olympic rower (1976) and surgeon.
- Rebekka Habermas, 64, German historian (University of Göttingen).
- Robert Harland, 88, American actor (Target: The Corruptors!).
- Lenka Hlávková, 49, Czech musicologist, music historian and academic, shot.
- Camille Huyghe, 93, French racing cyclist.
- Norbert Kindlmann, 79, German Olympic rower (1972).
- John C. Kornblum, 80, American diplomat, ambassador to Germany (1997–2001).
- Paula Murphy, 95, American Hall of Fame racing driver.
- David L. Norvell, 88, American politician, attorney general of New Mexico (1971–1975) and member of the New Mexico House of Representatives (1962–1970).
- Cristina Pacheco, 82, Mexican journalist (La Jornada) and television presenter.
- Roger Pomerleau, 76, Canadian politician, MP (1993–1997, 2008–2011).
- Frederic Raurell, 93, Spanish Capuchin and theologian, co-founder of the Catalan Journal of Theology.
- Josefa Saniel, 98, Filipino scholar, dean of University of the Philippines Asian Center (1980–1985).
- Robert Solow, 99, American economist (Solow–Swan model), Nobel Prize laureate (1987).
- Alexei Starobinsky, 75, Russian astrophysicist and cosmologist (Starobinsky inflation).
- Ricardo Taja Ramírez, 40, Mexican politician, deputy (2015–2018), shot.
- Dick Thoenen, 79, American baseball player (Philadelphia Phillies).
- Carlos Eugenio Vides Casanova, 86, Salvadoran military officer, head of the national guard (1979–1983) and minister of national defense (1983–1989).
- Carl Webb, 42, Australian rugby league player (Brisbane Broncos, North Queensland Cowboys, national team), complications from amyotrophic lateral sclerosis.

=== 22 ===
- Tom Bogs, 79, Danish Olympic boxer (1964).
- Andy Brandt, 85, Canadian politician, Ontario MPP (1981–1990).
- Frank Cassenti, 78, French stage and film director and screenwriter (The Song of Roland).
- Jorge Cauas, 89, Chilean economist and politician, minister of finance (1974–1976) and ambassador to the United States (1977–1978).
- Aleksei Chernavskii, 85, Russian mathematician.
- Oliver Everett, 80, British diplomat and public servant, Royal Librarian (1985–2002).
- Howard Fargo, 95, American politician, member of the Pennsylvania House of Representatives (1981–2000).
- Dimas Filgueiras, 79, Brazilian Olympic footballer (1964).
- Eva Hauserová, 69, Czech journalist and writer.
- Imroz, 97, Indian visual artist and poet.
- Sajid Khan, 71, Indian actor and singer, cancer.
- John Mairai, 78, French Polynesian poet, actor, and playwright.
- Micha Michaely, 95, Israeli economist.
- Heike Matthiesen, 59, German classical guitarist, cancer.
- Ryan Minor, 49, American baseball player (Baltimore Orioles), colon cancer.
- Ian Punnett, 63, American radio broadcaster (Coast to Coast AM), author and academic, liver disease.
- Armando Sardi, 83, Italian Olympic sprinter (1960).
- Ruth Seymour, 88, American radio executive (KCRW).
- Garly Sojo, 24, Venezuelan basketball player (Cocodrilos de Caracas, Broncos de Caracas, Capitanes de la Ciudad de México), complications from an epileptic seizure.
- Pratap Narayanrao Sonawane, 75, Indian politician, MP (2009–2014) and Maharashtra MLC (1998–2009).
- Ingrid Steeger, 76, German actress (Nurse Report, Three Men in the Snow, Andre Handles Them All), intestinal obstruction.
- Naser Tahmasb, 84, Iranian actor and voice actor (Princess of Rome), stroke.
- Giancarlo Tesini, 94, Italian politician, minister of transport (1992–1993) and deputy (1972–1992).
- Thomas Williams, 93, New Zealand Roman Catholic cardinal, archbishop of Wellington (1979–2005).
- Zhu Ling, 50, Chinese thallium poisoning victim, brain cancer.

=== 23 ===
- Iván Almeida, 45, Paraguayan football player (Sportivo Patria) and manager (Sportivo Trinidense, Resistencia), complications from aortic valve surgery.
- Hugh Aynesworth, 92, American journalist (Dallas Times Herald, Dallas Morning News, The Washington Times) and author.
- Bernard Bem, 87, Polish footballer (Ruch Chorzów, BKS STAL).
- Paul Cameron, 91, American football player (BC Lions, Pittsburgh Steelers).
- Izabella Cywińska, 88, Polish theater and film director, and film critic.
- John Greenwood, 89, Australian politician.
- Fredrik Heffermehl, 85, Norwegian peace activist, president of the Norwegian Peace Council (1988–2004).
- Murad Kajlayev, 92, Russian composer and conductor, People's Artist of the USSR (1981).
- Rihupisa Justus Kandando, 60, Namibian politician, president of SWANU (1998–2007).
- Roman Krutsyk, 78, Ukrainian politician, MP (1994–1998), director of Museum of Soviet Occupation (since 2007).
- Dejumo Lewis, 80, Nigerian actor (The Village Headmaster, A Place in the Stars, Agogo Eewo).
- Samboy Lim, 61, Filipino basketball player (San Miguel Beermen, Welcoat House Paints, national team).
- Lynn Loring, 80, American actress (Splendor in the Grass, Pressure Point, Doppelgänger) and television and film producer.
- Bonda Mani, 60, Indian actor (Muthu, Sundara Travels, Winner) and comedian, kidney failure.
- David W. McAlpin, 78, American linguist.
- Lisandro Meza, 86, Colombian singer and accordionist, complications from a stroke.
- Mike Nussbaum, 99, American actor (Fatal Attraction, Field of Dreams, Men in Black).
- Frank Okey, 104, American tennis and squash player.
- Harold Osher, 99, American cardiologist.
- William Pope.L, 68, American visual artist.
- Michael Radulescu, 80, Romanian-German composer.
- M. M. Rajendran, 88, Indian civil servant, governor of Odisha (1999–2004).
- Richard Rampton, 82, British libel lawyer.
- Richard Romanus, 80, American actor (Mean Streets, Strike Force, Wizards).
- Peter Schiller, 92, German-born American neuroscientist.
- Yoshikatsu Takeiri, 97, Japanese politician, MP (1967–1990), pneumonia.
- Lynne Zylstra, 78, New Zealand artist.

=== 24 ===
- Cheri Barry, 68, American politician, mayor of Meridian, Mississippi (2009–2013).
- Joseph Berger, 99, American sociologist and social psychologist (Expectation states theory).
- David Bookbinder, 82, British politician.
- Richard Bowes, 79, American science fiction author.
- Len Cella, 86, American actor and director, traffic collision.
- Tibor Czibere, 93, Hungarian engineer, university professor, minister of education (1988–1989).
- Troy Dargan, 26, Australian rugby league player (South Sydney Rabbitohs, Cook Islands national team), traffic collision.
- Mary Dawson, 81, Canadian lawyer and civil servant, conflict of interest and ethics commissioner (2007–2018).
- Kamar de los Reyes, 56, Puerto Rican actor (One Life to Live, Sleepy Hollow, Call of Duty: Black Ops II), cancer.
- Naomi Feil, 91, American gerontologist.
- Richard Franklin, 87, English actor (Doctor Who, Crossroads, Emmerdale), writer and director.
- Eveline Gottzein, 92, German engineer and university professor.
- José Haring, 83, German Roman Catholic prelate, bishop of Limoeiro do Norte (2000–2017).
- Vasilis Karras, 70, Greek laïko singer, complications from cancer and COVID-19.
- Rex Kodippili, 85, Sri Lankan actor (Kauda Bole Alice, Sonduru Dadabima, Ohoma Harida).
- Miro Kwasnica, 88, Canadian politician.
- David Leland, 82, British film director (Wish You Were Here, Virgin Territory), screenwriter (Mona Lisa), BAFTA winner (1988), and actor.
- David Libai, 89, Israeli jurist and politician, MK (1984–1996), minister of justice (1992–1996) and interior (1995).
- Melika Mohammadi, 23, Iranian footballer (Bam Khatoon, national team), traffic collision.
- Ron Nelson, 94, American composer.
- Ngethe Njoroge, 95, Kenyan diplomat, high commissioner to the United Kingdom (1970–1979).
- Alice Parker, 98, American composer, arranger, and choral conductor.
- Nisar Qadri, 82, Pakistani actor (Khamosh Pani, Hum Ek Hain).
- Kazimieras Ragulskis, 97, Lithuanian engineer, member of the Lithuanian Academy of Sciences.
- Harry Rosen, 92, Canadian menswear retailer, founder of Harry Rosen Inc.
- Hazel Rossotti, 93, British chemist.
- Willie Ruff, 92, American jazz musician and educator.
- Reggie Savage, 53, Canadian ice hockey player (Washington Capitals, Quebec Nordiques), cancer.
- Bjørn Skogstad Aamo, 77, Norwegian politician and economist, director of the Financial Supervisory Authority of Norway (1993–2011).
- Sherif Sonbol, 67, Egyptian photographer.
- Paul Tapponnier, 76, French geologist.
- Mike Weston, 85, English rugby union player (national team, British & Irish Lions).
- Milan Zeleny, 81, Czech-American economist.

=== 25 ===
- Yehoshua Ben-Arieh, 95, Israeli geographer, rector of the Hebrew University of Jerusalem (1993–1997).
- Frieder Birzele, 83, German politician, member of the Landtag of Baden-Württemberg (1976–2006).
- Anthony Dias Blue, 82, American author and columnist.
- Jim Breaks, 83, British professional wrestler.
- Vinie Burrows, 99, American stage actress.
- Pamela Cluff, 92, British-born Canadian architect.
- Élise Fischer, 75, French writer, journalist and novelist.
- David Freeman, 84, American record label owner (County Records) and music historian, Alzheimer's disease.
- Bill Granger, 54, Australian chef and food writer (The Independent), cancer.
- Alain Laurier, 79, French Olympic football player (1968) and manager (Istres).
- Razi Mousavi, 59–60, Iranian major general, airstrike.
- Robert Porter, 81, Australian rules footballer (Hawthorn).
- Tom Priestley, 91, British film and sound editor (Deliverance, The Great Gatsby, 1984).
- Eugenio Riccomini, 87, Italian art historian.
- Henry Sandon, 95, English antique expert (Antiques Roadshow), stroke.
- Susan K. Sell, 65, American scholar.
- Thanh Điền, 56, Vietnamese guitarist, anemia.
- Larry Walker, 88, American visual artist.
- Thomas Walter Warnes, 84–85, English gastroenterologist.

=== 26 ===
- Edwin Amidon, 89, American politician.
- Bandit, 38, Thai drag queen (Drag Race Thailand), costume designer, and stylist.
- Jolly Bastian, 57, Indian stunt director (Putnanja, Annayya, Super Ranga), heart attack.
- Patrick Buisson, 74, French journalist (Minute, Valeurs actuelles, Le Crapouillot) and political advisor.
- Lukas Enembe, 56, Indonesian politician, governor of Papua (2013–2023), kidney failure.
- John Fernandez, 82, Malaysian politician, MP (2008–2013).
- Armando Guadiana Tijerina, 77, Mexican politician, member of the Congress of Coahuila (1973–1976) and senator (since 2018), prostate cancer.
- Joseph Hendrie, 98, American physicist, chairman of the Nuclear Regulatory Commission (1977–1979).
- David Kernan, 85, British actor (Mix Me a Person, Zulu, Carry On Abroad).
- Riaz Khokhar, 80, Pakistani diplomat, foreign secretary (2002–2005), ambassador to the United States (1997–1999) and China (1999–2002).
- Elsa Lystad, 93, Norwegian actress (Hurra for Andersens!, Deilig er fjorden!, Smuglere).
- Salmi Manja, 86, Malaysian novelist, poet, and journalist.
- Lesley McNaught-Mändli, 59, British-born Swiss show jumper, Olympic silver medallist (2000).
- Ronald Mehlich, 54, Polish athlete.
- Yaşar Okuyan, 73, Turkish politician, writer, and journalist, minister of labour and social security (1999–2002) and MP (1996–2002), lung disease.
- Tony Oxley, 85, English free improvising drummer, co-founder of Incus Records.
- Sir Gurney Pease, 5th Baronet, 96, British hotelier and politician.
- Noel Peyton, 88, Irish footballer (Leeds United, Shamrock Rovers, national team).
- James Ray, 66, American basketball player (Denver Nuggets, Berloni Torino, Fenerbahçe), complications from surgery.
- Bobby Rivers, 70, American television personality (WISN-TV, WPIX, VH1), cancer.
- Wolfgang Schäuble, 81, German politician and lawyer, minister of finance (2009–2017), president (2017–2021) and member of the Bundestag (since 1972), cancer.
- Tom Smothers, 86, American comedian, musician (Smothers Brothers) and actor (Get to Know Your Rabbit, Serial), lung cancer.

=== 27 ===
- Rotimi Akeredolu, 67, Nigerian lawyer and politician, governor of Ondo State (since 2017), leukemia.
- Yuri Arabov, 69, Russian screenwriter (The Lonely Voice of Man, Days of Eclipse, Moloch), writer and poet.
- Ken Bowman, 81, American football player (Green Bay Packers).
- Juliette Carré, 90, French actress.
- Jackie D'Amico, 87, American mobster (Gambino crime family).
- Darchhawna, 87, Indian writer.
- Jacques Delors, 98, French economist and politician, minister of finance (1981–1984), MEP (1979–1981), and president of the European Commission (1985–1995).
- Éamonn Draper, 83, Irish actor (Ros na Rún).
- Patricia Ferreira, 65, Spanish film and television director and screenwriter (I Know Who You Are, The Wild Ones).
- Forestry, 27, American Thoroughbred racehorse.
- Gaston Glock, 94, Austrian engineer and weapons industry executive, founder of Glock.
- Martin Hatcher, 96, American politician.
- Fred Kaufman, 99, Canadian jurist, judge of the Quebec Court of Appeal (1973–1991) and acting chief justice of Quebec (1990–1991).
- Herb Kohl, 88, American politician, businessman (Kohl's), and sports team owner (Milwaukee Bucks), member of the U.S. Senate (1989–2013).
- Maria Laina, 76, Greek poet.
- Sir Martin Laing, 81, British construction executive.
- Lee Sun-kyun, 48, South Korean actor (My Mister, Parasite, Paju), suicide by carbon monoxide poisoning.
- Itzhak Levanon, 79, Israeli diplomat, ambassador to Egypt (2009–2011).
- Ignacio E. Lozano Jr., 96, American diplomat, ambassador to El Salvador (1976–1977).
- Jack McLean, 77, Scottish journalist and art teacher.
- Ghali Umar Na'Abba, 65, Nigerian politician, speaker of the House of Representatives (1999–2003).
- Mbongeni Ngema, 68, South African playwright (Sarafina!, Woza Albert!), traffic collision.
- Michael Kwabena Ntumy, 65, Ghanaian Pentecostal televangelist, chairman of the Church of Pentecost (1998–2008).
- Bob Panasik, 82, Canadian golfer.
- Robert Andrew Parker, 96, American illustrator.
- Lydia Puccinelli, 93, American artist and art curator.
- Frederick Sachs, 82, American biologist.
- Odete Santos, 82, Portuguese politician, MP (1980–2007).
- María Seoane, 75, Argentine economist, journalist, and writer, director of LRA Radio Nacional (2009–2015).
- Leonard Singer, 80, British-born Manx politician, member of the House of Keys (2001–2006, 2011–2016).
- PC Siqueira, 37, Brazilian Internet personality, actor (Internet – O Filme), and television presenter, suicide by hanging.

=== 28 ===
- Shaharuddin Abdullah, 75, Malaysian footballer (Penang, national team, 1972 Olympic team).
- Norair Arakelian, 87, Armenian mathematician. (death announced on this date)
- Elmer Austin, 74, American basketball player (North Carolina A&T Aggies)
- Dave Bailey, 97, American jazz drummer.
- François Bracci, 72, French football player (Marseille, national team) and manager (Rouen).
- Francis Dhomont, 97, French composer.
- Kelly Doran, 66, American businessman and real estate developer, cancer.
- Alda Grimaldi, 104, Italian television director and actress.
- Hardi, 72, Indonesian visual artist.
- Günter Hirschmann, 88, German footballer (1. FC Magdeburg, East Germany national team).
- Frank Kaderabek, 94, American trumpeter.
- Eduard Khamitov, 86, Russian scientist and politician, MP (2005–2007).
- Tandy Marlin, 53, American racing driver.
- Hernán Martínez, 81, Colombian chemical engineer and politician, minister of mines and energy (2006–2010).
- Dick Marty, 78, Swiss politician, member of the Council of States (1995–2011).
- Jacquelyn Mattfeld, 98, American musicologist and academic administrator.
- Bill McColl, 93, American football player (Chicago Bears).
- Dermot Meagher, 83, American lawyer and judge.
- Sanford K. Moats, 102, American lieutenant general.
- Per Myrberg, 90, Swedish actor (A Handful of Love, The Simple-Minded Murderer, The Girl with the Dragon Tattoo).
- Carlos Pulido, 52, Venezuelan baseball player (Minnesota Twins).
- Herman Raucher, 95, American writer (Summer of '42, Watermelon Man, The Other Side of Midnight).
- Michael Sacco, 86, American labor leader.
- Abubakar Siddique, 89, Bangladeshi poet, writer and critic.
- Pedro Suárez-Vértiz, 54, Peruvian singer-songwriter (Arena Hash), heart attack.
- Tommy Talton, 74, American guitarist (We the People, Cowboy).
- Vijayakanth, 71, Indian actor (Senthoora Poove, Thayagam) and politician, Tamil Nadu MLA (2006–2016), pneumonia and COVID-19.
- Bill Voss, 80, American baseball player (Chicago White Sox, California Angels, Milwaukee Brewers).
- Kurt Wagner, 70, German actor, cancer.
- Patrick Walsh, 92, Northern Irish Roman Catholic prelate, bishop of Down and Connor (1991–2008).
- Lloyd R. Welch, 96, American information theorist.
- Donald Wildmon, 85, American United Methodist minister, author, and radio host, founder of the American Family Association, Lewy body dementia.

=== 29 ===
- Mike Barnett, 77, English-born Australian politician, member (1974–1996) and speaker (1986–1993) of the Western Australian Legislative Assembly, complications from dementia.
- Hermann Baumann, 89, German horn player.
- Greg Boester, 55, American Olympic ski jumper (1994).
- John M. Burns, 84–85, English comics artist (The Seekers, Modesty Blaise, Judge Dredd).
- Kurtis Chapman, 26, English professional wrestler (Revolution Pro Wrestling), suicide by hanging.
- Gustavo Cisneros, 78, Venezuelan conglomerate industry executive, president of Grupo Cisneros (since 1970).
- Gil de Ferran, 56, French-born Brazilian racing driver, CART champion (2000, 2001), 2003 Indianapolis 500 winner, heart attack.
- Sir Michael Hardie Boys, 92, New Zealand lawyer, jurist, and vice-regal representative, judge of the High Court (1980–1989), governor-general (1996–2001), privy counsellor (since 1989).
- Maurice Hines, 80, American dancer, singer and actor (The Cotton Club).
- Killer Khan, 76, Japanese professional wrestler (Mid-South, Stampede, WWF), aortic dissection.
- Marceli Kosman, 83, Polish historian.
- Roland Leong, 78, American drag racer.
- Les McCann, 88, American jazz pianist, pneumonia.
- Rossy Mendoza, 80, Mexican vedette, actress (Sweetly You'll Die Through Love), and dancer, heart attack.
- Joey Meyer, 74, American basketball coach (DePaul Blue Demons).
- Khaled Nezzar, 86, Algerian military officer, chief of staff (1988–1990).
- Sandra Reaves-Phillips, 79, American actress (Ma Rainey's Black Bottom, Round Midnight, Lean on Me), writer, and singer.
- Lammie Robertson, 76, Scottish footballer (Halifax Town, Exeter City, Brighton & Hove Albion), prostate cancer.
- A. Kimball Romney, 98, American social sciences professor (University of California, Irvine), co-founder of cognitive anthropology.
- Toshio Sakata, 82, Japanese comedian.
- Ramzi T. Salamé, 70, Lebanese writer and artist.
- Ron Stockman, 89, Australian rules footballer (Footscray, South Melbourne).
- Ron Taylor, 91, Australian rugby league player (Eastern Suburbs, South Sydney, New South Wales).
- Mosese Tikoitoga, Fijian soldier and diplomat, commander of the Military Forces (2014–2015).
- Roger Vowles, 91, English cricketer.

=== 30 ===
- Bryan Ansell, 68, British game designer (Warhammer).
- Paul Buysse, 78, Belgian businessman.
- Jean-Gabriel Castel, 95, French-Canadian law professor.
- Nelma Costa, 101, Brazilian actress.
- Martha Diamond, 79, American painter.
- Dennis Edney, 77, Scottish-born Canadian lawyer, complications from dementia.
- Bernie Fagan, 74, English footballer (Los Angeles Aztecs, Portland Timbers).
- Keith Fowler, 84, American actor.
- Chuck Harrison, 82, American baseball player (Houston Astros, Kansas City Royals).
- Yehudith Huebner, 102, Austrian-born Israeli civil servant and diplomat.
- Norma Izard, 90, English cricketer (national team).
- Khachim Karmokov, 82, Russian politician, MP (1993–1995) and senator (2001–2009).
- Roger E. Kirk, 93, American psychologist.
- Luboš Kohoutek, 88, Czech astronomer, discoverer of Comet Kohoutek.
- Harvey S. Leff, 86, American physicist.
- Robin McEwan, Lord McEwan, 80, Scottish judge, senator of the College of Justice (2000–2008).
- Cindy Morgan, 69, American actress (Tron, Caddyshack, Falcon Crest).
- Paddy Murphy, 89, Irish Gaelic footballer.
- Red Paden, 67, American juke joint owner, complications following heart surgery.
- Douglas J. J. Peters, 60, American politician, member (2007–2021) and majority leader (2016–2019) of the Maryland Senate, multiple myeloma.
- John Pilger, 84, Australian documentary filmmaker (Year Zero: The Silent Death of Cambodia, Death of a Nation, The Secret Country: The First Australians Fight Back) and journalist, pulmonary fibrosis.
- Leo Prabhu, 90, Indian dramatist, playwright and novelist.
- Pierre Pranchère, 96, French politician, deputy (1956–1958) and MEP (1979–1989).
- Ali Sharif al-Rifi, Libyan major general, commander of the Libyan Air Force.
- Bhavani Shankar, 66–67, Indian pakhawaj drum player, cardiac arrest.
- Sir Moray Stewart, 85, British civil servant, Second Permanent Secretary of the Ministry of Defence (1990–1996).
- Mick Wheble, 74, British racing manager, author and charity advocate, oesophageal cancer.
- Tom Wilkinson, 75, British actor (The Full Monty, In the Bedroom, Michael Clayton), BAFTA winner (1998), cardiac arrest.
- Ian Wingrove, 79, English visual effects artist (Return to Oz, The Dark Crystal, The Wolfman).
- Aki Yashiro, 73, Japanese singer, interstitial pneumonia.

=== 31 ===
- Luís Blanco Vila, 87, Spanish journalist.
- June Jackson Christmas, 99, American psychiatrist, heart failure.
- Jay Clayton, 82, American jazz vocalist, small-cell lung cancer.
- Colita, 83, Spanish photographer, peritonitis.
- Shecky Greene, 97, American comedian and actor (History of the World, Part I, Splash, Tony Rome).
- Edith Halbert, 92, American physicist.
- Kariman Hamza, 81, Egyptian journalist and presenter.
- Dale Hodges, 82, Canadian politician, Calgary city councillor (1983–2013).
- Melissa Hoskins, 32, Australian Olympic cyclist (2012), traffic collision.
- Eddie Bernice Johnson, 88, American politician, member of the U.S. House of Representatives (1993–2023) and Texas Senate (1987–1993).
- Amir Banoo Karimi, 92, Iranian academic, pulmonary heart disease.
- Mathieu Khedimi, 59, French rugby league footballer (AS Saint-Estève, national team) and coach (AS Saint-Estève).
- Benjamin Kiplagat, 34, Ugandan Olympic long-distance runner (2008, 2012, 2016), stabbed.
- Maunu Kurkvaara, 97, Finnish film director (Yksityisalue, 4x4) and producer (Let Not One Devil Cross the Bridge).
- Jaerock Lee, 80, South Korean Christian pastor and convicted sex offender, founder of the Manmin Central Church.
- Erik Meyn, 68, Norwegian journalist and television director.
- Ana Ofelia Murguía, 90, Mexican actress (The Queen of the Night, Nobody Will Speak of Us When We're Dead, Coco).
- Susi Newborn, 73, New Zealand environmental activist.
- Oscar Quitak, 97, British actor (Yes, Prime Minister, Howards' Way, A Very British Coup).
- Pranab K. Sen, 87, Indian-American statistician and academic.
- O. S. Thyagarajan, 76, Indian Carnatic musician.
- Cale Yarborough, 84, American Hall of Fame racing driver and founder of Cale Yarborough Motorsports, NASCAR Cup Series champion (1976, 1977, 1978).
