= Edith Halbert =

American physicist

Edith Conrad Halbert
- Born: April 23, 1931; New York City, NY
- Died: December 31, 2023 (aged 92); Oak Ridge, TN
- Education: Cornell University; University of Rochester
- Spouse: Melvyn Halbert (m. 1951)
- Children: 3
- Scientific career
- Workplaces: Oak Ridge National Laboratory
- Thesis: A shell model for the even-parity states of N¹⁵ and general results for states of parity ( - )A̳¹ in the nuclei 5 ≤A ≤ 16 (1957)
- Doctoral advisor: James Bruce French

Edith Conrad Halbert (23 April 1931 – 31 December 2023) was an American physicist, elected a Fellow of the American Physical Society in 1972. She worked on computations in the nuclear shell model at the Oak Ridge National Laboratory.

== Education ==
Halbert attended Cornell University, where she was elected to Sigma Xi and graduated with a bachelor's degree in 1951. She then went to the University of Rochester to pursue graduate studies in physics. At Rochester, she was the student of James Bruce French. She earned a doctorate in 1957 with a PhD thesis entitled A Shell Model for the Even-Parity States of Nitrogen-15.

== Career ==
She worked at the Oak Ridge National Laboratory, where she directed the development of the Oak Ridge–Rochester Multi-Shell Program, a computer program used to compute the properties of atomic nuclei based on the nuclear shell model. While at Oak Ridge, she also worked as a visiting scientist in the low energy nuclear theory group at the Brookhaven National Laboratory and the nuclear theory group at Stony Brook University.

== Personal life ==
Halbert came from a Forest Hills, New York family. She married Melvyn Halbert of Jamaica, New York, also a Cornell and University of Rochester physics student and later an Oak Ridge researcher.

== Selected publications ==
- Zucker, A.; Howard, F. T.; Halbert, E. C., eds. (1961). Proceedings of the 2nd Conference on Reactions Between Complex Nuclei, May 2–4, 1960, Gatlinburg, Tennessee. New York & London: John Wiley & Sons.
- Halbert, E. C. (January 1964). "Optical-model analysis of elastic deuteron scattering". Nuclear Physics. 50: 353–402. Bibcode:1964NucPh..50..353H. doi:10.1016/0029-5582(64)90216-0.
- Austern, N.; Drisko, R. M.; Halbert, E. C.; Satchler, G. R. (1964-01-13). "Theory of finite-range distorted-waves calculations". Physical Review. 133 (1B): B3–B16. Bibcode:1964PhRv..133....3A. doi:10.1103/PhysRev.133.B3. ISSN 0031-899X.
- McGrory, J. B.; Wildenthal, B. H.; Halbert, E. C. (1970-07-01). "Shell-model structure of ^{42−50}Ca". Physical Review C. 2 (1): 186–212. Bibcode:1970PhRvC...2..186M. doi:10.1103/PhysRevC.2.186. ISSN 0556-2813.
- Ichimura, Munetake; Arima, Akito; Halbert, E. C.; Terasawa, Tokuo (April 1973). "Alpha-particle spectroscopic amplitudes and the SU(3) model". Nuclear Physics A. 204 (2): 225–278. Bibcode:1973NuPhA.204..225I. doi:10.1016/0375-9474(73)90272-8. OSTI 4564483.
