= Howard Weaver =

American journalist (1950 – 2023)

Howard Weaver (October 15, 1950 – December 14, 2023) was an American journalist and newspaper executive for McClatchy. He was the winner of the Pulitzer Prize in 1976 and 1989. Weaver died due to complications of pancreatic cancer on December 14, 2023, at the age of 73.
