= Frederick Sachs =

American biologist (1941–2023)

- Born: January 8, 1941; Hudson Valley, New York, U.S.
- Died: December 27, 2023 (aged 82); Buffalo, New York, U.S.

Academic background
- Education: BA, Physics, 1962, University of Rochester; PhD, Physiology, 1971, State University of New York Upstate Medical University
- Thesis: Electrophysiological properties of tissue cultured heart cells grown in a linear array (1970)

Frederick Sachs (January 8, 1941 – December 27, 2023) was an American biologist. He was a SUNY Distinguished Professor in the University at Buffalo's Department of Physiology and Biophysics.

== Biography ==
Frederick Sachs was born on January 8, 1941. He grew up on a farm in Hudson Valley, where he learned how to milk cows, raise chickens, and pigs. He completed his Bachelor of Arts degree in physics from the University of Rochester in 1962 and his PhD in physiology at the State University of New York Upstate Medical University in 1971. Sachs died in Buffalo, New York, on December 27, 2023, at the age of 82.

== Career ==
=== Tonus Therapeutics ===
After completing his formal education, Sachs taught organic chemistry at Chaminade College School followed by a position as a staff fellow at the National Institutes of Health. In 1978, he accepted an assistant professor position in the University at Buffalo's Department of Pharmacology. In this role, Sachs discovered mechanosensitive ion channels which are sensors for systems including the senses of hearing, touch, and balance. As a result of his discovery, he also created the only drug to inhibit these channels. Sachs believed that spider venom could contain molecular compounds that could block the ion channels.

After discovering the possibility of a drug, he was contacted by several large pharmaceutical companies but none offered to adopt the drug. He eventually co-launched Rose Pharmaceuticals in 2009, which was named after Sachs’ pet tarantula and grandmother, with a stockbroker named Harvey whose grandson had had Duchenne muscular dystrophy. The following year, the Food and Drug Administration designated the firm’s peptide, called GsMTx4, as an orphan drug for Duchenne muscular dystrophy.

In 2012, Sachs and Harvey opened their first-ever headquarters in UB’s New York State Center of Excellence in Bioinformatics and Life Sciences and re-named the company Tonus Therapeutics. Within two years, the company sold the rights to their drug to Akashi Therapeutics. He also began studying AT-300’s effectiveness in dystrophic mice. By 2018, Sachs demonstrated that the drug significantly reduced loss of muscle mass and susceptibility to muscle damage from repeated stimulation in an advanced animal model of DMD.

=== Other research ===
In 2001, Sachs led a research team at UB which found that a chemical isolated from the venom of the Chilean tarantula could calm abnormal rhythms induced in rabbit hearts. Sachs said the result of this study showed that the protein could herald a new class of compounds that could be targeted at treating the causes, rather than the symptoms, of atrial fibrillation. Following this discovery, Sachs was named a UB Distinguished Professor and honored by Buffalo Business First for his invention.

In 2013, Sachs and his research team identified that familial xerocytosis causes symptoms, such as the shortness of breath seen in anemic patients. This identification marked the first time defects in a mechanosensitive ion channel were implicated as the cause of a disease.

Beyond spider venom, Sachs also conducted the first voltage clamp studies of isolated adult heart cells. He was also responsible for the first single-channel recording from tissue cultured cells.

=== Awards and honors ===
Sachs won the 2013 Kenneth S. Cole Award from the Biophysical Society "for his significant contributions to the understanding of cell membrane biophysics." Sachs also received an Entrepreneurial Spirit Award at UB’s annual Inventors and Entrepreneurs Reception in 2015.
