= Kenneth Ringsrød =

Norwegian footballer (1969–2023)

Personal information
- Full name: Lars Kenneth Ringsrød
- Date of birth: 22 February 1969
- Place of birth: Sarpsborg, Norway
- Date of death: 9 December 2023 (aged 54)
- Place of death: Sarpsborg, Norway
- Position: Goalkeeper

Youth career
- Sarpsborg

Senior career*
Years	Team	Apps	(Gls)
–1990	Sarpsborg		
1990	Kvik Halden		
1991–1992	Borgen		
1993–1994	Sarpsborg		
1995	Kongsvinger	21	(0)
1996	Fredrikstad		
1997	Sarpsborg		
1999–2000	Sarpsborg		
2000	→ Moss (loan)		
2001	Borgen		
- * Club domestic league appearances and goals

Kenneth Ringsrød (22 February 1969 – 9 December 2023) was a Norwegian footballer who played as a goalkeeper.

== Career ==
Ringsrød started his career in Sarpsborg FK. He signed for Kvik Halden in the autumn of 1990, but instead joined Borgen IL before the start of the 1991 season. Ahead of the 1995 season he went from Sarpsborg to first-tier club Kongsvinger, where he played the season as first-choice goalkeeper. He especially became known for crucial saves during a late-season game against Rosenborg, securing one point for Kongsvinger as well as a renewed spot in Eliteserien.

Despite good performances on the pitch, Ringsrød's contract was terminated by Kongsvinger after the 1995 season because of non-football related issues. He moved back to Østfold and joined second-division Fredrikstad the following season. In 1997 he returned to Sarpsborg for a spell in the 1997 1. divisjon. In 2000 he was picked up by Moss FK as second-choice goalkeeper while Per Morten Kristiansen suffered from mononucleosis, but never played an official match for the club.

== Death ==
Ringsrød died in Sarpsborg on 9 December 2023, at the age of 54.
