= Edith Hemenway =

American composer and pianist (1926–2023)

Edith Hemenway (née Fitz, December 23, 1926 – December 19, 2023) was an American composer and pianist. Hemenway was born in Boston on December 23, 1926, and died on December 19, 2023, at the age of 96.

== Recordings ==
- Edith Hemenway - To Paradise for Onions / Songs and Chamber Works - Doors (2010) - Questions of Travel (1999, arr. 2007) - To Paradise for Onions (2001) - A Child's Garden of Verses (1984) - Asian Figures (1979) - Four Poems of Langston Hughes (± 1980–1985) Claron McFadden and Roberta Alexander, Nancy Braithwaite, Michael Stirling, Vaughan Schlepp Et'cetera KTC 1632 72' (2018)
