= James Bruce French =

Canadian and American theoretical physicist

J. Bruce French
- Born: November 13, 1921; St. John's, Newfoundland
- Died: February 1, 2002 (aged 80); St. Petersburg, Florida
- Education: Dalhousie University; Massachusetts Institute of Technology
- Known for: Oak Ridge-Rochester shell-model code
- Awards: Guggenheim Fellowship (1977)
- Scientific career
- Fields: Nuclear physics
- Workplaces: University of Rochester
- Doctoral advisor: Victor Weisskopf

James Bruce French (1921–2002) was a Canadian and American theoretical physicist, specializing in nuclear physics.

J. Bruce French received in 1942 his bachelor's degree in physics from Dalhousie University and served during WWII in the Royal Canadian Navy, performing acoustical studies related to antisubmarine warfare. He received his Ph.D. from MIT in 1948 with a thesis on relativistic calculation of the Lamb shift. From 1948 to 1950 French was a research associate at MIT. At the University of Rochester, he was from 1950 to 1951 a research fellow, from 1951 to 1956 an assistant professor, from 1956 to 1960 an associate professor, and from 1960 to 1992 a full professor, retiring in 1992 as professor emeritus.

He did pioneering research on deuteron stripping (direct reactions), the nuclear shell model, and statistical spectroscopy. He and his student Malcolm H. Macfarlane (1933–2008) published in 1960 the extensive review article Stripping reactions and the structure of light and intermediate nuclei, which has been cited over 700 times.

Bruce introduced formalism based on tensorial operators, which incorporated the methods of group theory and second quantization into shell-model theory. ... Through these methods, he derived sum rules and particle–hole relations, which he could use to connect seemingly disparate spectroscopic data.

In the last stage of his career he did research on "development and application of central limit theorems on groups for studying the "smoothed" behavior of complicated quantum systems; and extended random-matrix and related methods for studying quantum chaos." He was a co-author of a highly cited (2700 citations) review article on random-matrix physics, published in 1981.

J. Bruce French was the author or co-author of about 130 research articles and reviews. He was the thesis supervisor for 23 doctoral students. In April 1993 the University of Rochester held a symposium in his honor. He was predeceased by his wife and survived by a daughter and two sons.
