= Volodia Vaisman =

Romanian-French chess player (1937–2023)

- Vaisman in 1998
- Born: 25 December 1937; Bălți, Romania
- Died: 4 December 2023 (aged 85)
- Education: Alexandru Ioan Cuza University
- Occupation: Chess player

Volodia Vaisman (25 December 1937 – 4 December 2023) was a Romanian-French chess player. He became an International Master in 1975.

== Biography ==
Born in Bălți on 25 December 1937, Vaisman evacuated from the Eastern Front in World War II with his mother, going to Central Asia. He lost his father during the war and survived a land mine explosion which killed two other children. After the war, he returned to Romania and settled in Botoșani. He attended the Alexandru Ioan Cuza University in Iași and thereafter became a Romanian teacher and chess player. He achieved the rank of International Master in 1975 and could subsequently play in tournaments.

In 1984, Vaisman took advantage of a tournament to escape the Nicolae Ceaușescu regime with his wife, settling in Montpellier. He was granted political asylum and obtained French citizenship in 1986. He trained chess players such as Sophie Milliet. He joined Échecs Club Montpellier, which moved up to the first division in 1987. He left following the death of Jean-Claude Loubatière and the arrival of Sylvaine Milliet.

Volodia Vaisman died on 4 December 2023, at the age of 85.

== Books ==
- O idee străbate deschiderile: zece idei şi combinaţii tipice (1983)
- Stratégies de jeu en début de partie (2000)
- L'Intermède logistique, début-milieu de partie (2001)
- Stratégies de jeu positionnel en milieu de partie (2002)
- Méthodologie de l'entrainement échiquéen (2012)
- Rememorări şahiste (2013)
