= Bernard Bem =

Polish footballer (1936–2023)

Personal information
- Full name: Bernard Ludwik Bem
- Date of birth: 29 September 1936
- Place of birth: Dąbrówka Mała, Poland
- Date of death: 23 December 2023 (aged 87)
- Height: 1.66 m (5 ft 5 in)
- Position: Striker

Youth career
- KS 22 Dąbrówka Mała

Senior career*
Years	Team	Apps	(Gls)
1956–1957	Kolejarz Katowice		
1958–1971	Ruch Chorzów	262	(26)
1972	BKS Stal Bielsko-Biała		
- * Club domestic league appearances and goals

Bernard "Berek" Ludwik Bem, born Bernard Böhm (29 September 1936 – 23 December 2023), was a Polish footballer who played as a striker.

Bem was born in Dąbrówka Mała on 29 September 1936. Between 1958 and 1971 he made 308 appearances in total and scored 28 goals, of which 262 were in the top flight in which he scored 26 goals, and won 2 Polish Championships in 1960 and 1968; all with Ruch Chorzów. He died on 23 December 2023, at the age of 87. He was buried on 29 December 2023 at the Wróblewskiego Street Cemetery in Katowice.

== Honours ==
Ruch Chorzów

- Ekstraklasa: 1960, 1967–68
