= Eugenio Riccomini =

Italian art historian (1936–2023)

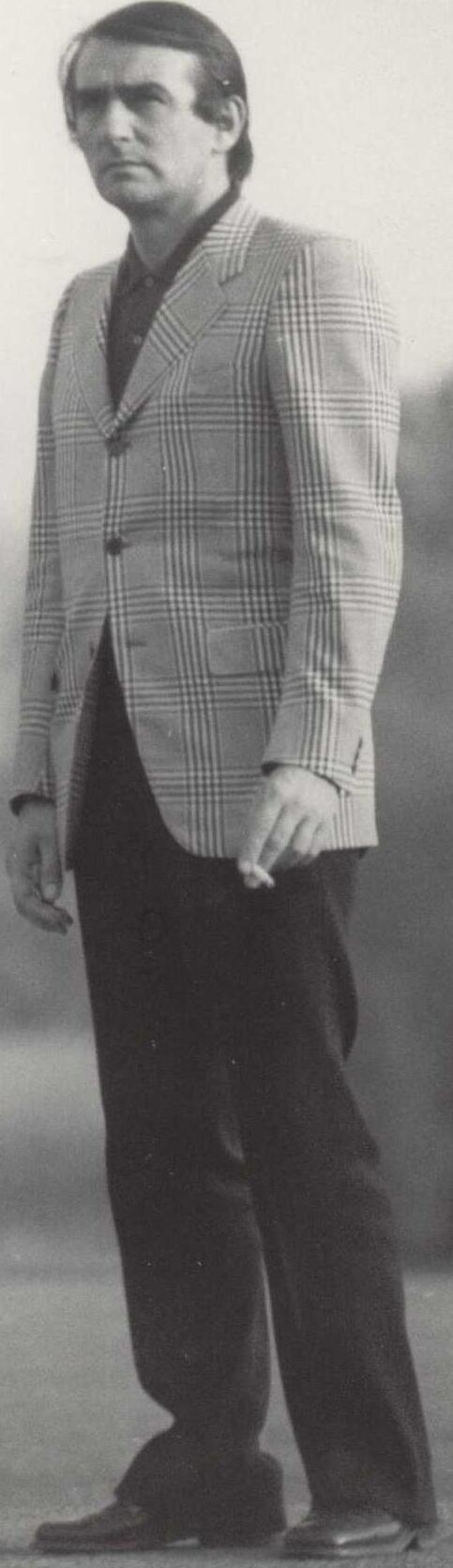

Eugenio Riccomini (5 May 1936 – 25 December 2023) was an Italian art historian. He died on 25 December 2023, at age of 87.

== Publications ==
- Il Seicento ferrarese. Ferrara: Cassa di Risparmio di Ferrara. 1969. SBN: IT\ICCU\NAP\0165805.
- Settecento ferrarese. Ferrara: Cassa di Risparmio di Ferrara. 1970. SBN: IT\ICCU\NAP\0165814.
- Ordine e vaghezza. La scultura in Emilia nell'età barocca, Zanichelli Editore, Bologna, 1972.
- Italianskaja zivopis' XVIII vieka (catalogo della mostra di Leningrado, Mosca e Varsavia), edizione italiana: Pittura italiana del Settecento, pubblicata nella collana Rapporto della soprintendenza alle gallerie di Bologna, 20, 1974.
- Vaghezza e furore: la scultura del Settecento in Emilia, Zanichelli Editore, Bologna, 1977.
- I fasti, i lumi, le grazie. Pittori del Settecento parmense, Silvana editoriale d'arte, Milano, 1978.
- Arte del Settecento emiliano (catalogo della mostra di Bologna, Parma e Faenza), 5 volumi, Nuova Alfa Editore, Bologna, 1979.
- La più bella di tutte. La cupola del Correggio nel duomo di Parma, Amilcare Pizzi, Cinisello Balsamo, 1983.
- "Il Correggio e il suo lascito: storia di un'eredità perduta e ritrovata", in (catalogo della mostra di Washington e Parma), Edizioni Artegrafica Silva, Parma, 1984.
- "Gli affreschi parmensi del Correggio e del Parmigianino: vicende del gusto, tra bellezza ed eleganza", in Nell'età di Correggio e dei Carracci. Pittura in Emilia dei secoli XVI e XVII (catalogo della mostra di Bologna), Nuova Alfa Editoriale, Bologna, 1986.
- "La pittura del Cinquecento nelle province occidentali dell'Emilia", in La pittura in Italia. Il Cinquecento, I, Electa, Milano, 1987.
- Il perditempo. Passeggiate per Bologna, Edizioni Tipoarte, Bologna, 1989 (ristampa, 2000).
- "Un miracol d'arte senza esempio", in Un miracol d'arte senza esempio. La cupola del Correggio in San Giovanni Evangelista a Parma, Tipolitografia Benedettina Editrice, Parma, 1990.
- 1789 e dintorni. L'arte negli anni della rivoluzione francese, Editoriale Mongolfiera, Bologna, 1990.
- "Gli inizi del Crespi: « Una maniera affatto nuova, tratta però da lunghi studi»", in Giuseppe Maria Crespi 1665-1747 (catalogo della mostra di Bologna), Nuova Alfa Editoriale, Bologna, 1990.
- Il perditempo, 2. Altre passeggiate per Bologna, Nuova Alfa Editoriale, Bologna, 1991.
- Aprilocchio. Un itinerario per scoprire le cinquanta cose più belle della città di Bologna, Nuova Alfa Editoriale, Bologna, 1991 (ristampa, 2000).
- A caccia di farfalle. Manuale semplice e breve per guardare quadri e sculture senza complessi d'inferiorità, Nuova Alfa Editoriale, Bologna, 1994 (II edizione Zanichelli, Bologna, 2005).
- "La scultura farnesiana nel tempo barocco", in I Farnese. Arte e collezionismo. Studi, Edizioni Electa, Milano, 1995.
- "Le variate e novissime invenzioni. Permanenze e mutamenti del gusto: gli affreschi nelle “magnifiche stanze” del palazzo di Zola", in Le magnifiche stanze. Paesaggio, architettura, decorazione e vita nella villa Palazzo degli Albergati, Edizioni Bolis, Bergamo, 1995.
- "Una visita alla Galleria nazionale", in Galleria nazionale di Parma. Catalogo delle opere dall'antico al Cinquecento, FMR, Milano, 1997.
- "Introduzione", in Donato Creti, Melanconia e perfezione (Donato Creti: Melancholy and Perfection; catalogo della mostra di New York e Los Angeles), Edizioni Olivares, Milano, 1998.
- Giovanni Antonio Burrini, (collana Pittori d'Italia, 2), Edizioni Tipoarte, Ozzano Emilia, 1999.
- "Il Barocco in geometria. Un paio di considerazioni sui Bibiena", I Bibiena, una famiglia europea (catalogo della mostra di Bologna), Marsilio editori, Venezia, 2000.
- "Sette saggi sul Correggio", in Quaderni della Fondazione Il Correggio, 5, 2003.
- L'arte a Bologna. Dalle origini ai giorni nostri, Editoriale Bologna srl, Bologna, 2003 (II edizione: Edizione Pendragon, Bologna, 2011).
- Correggio (collana I maestri, 22), Electa, Milano (Corrège, edizione francese, Gallimard, Parigi), 2005.
- "Annibale. Studiosa letizia del dipingere all'italiana", in Annibale Carracci – catalogo della mostra di Bologna e Roma, Electa, Milano, 2006.
- L'Ercole trionfante. I tre Carracci a Casa Sampieri, Edizioni Minerva, Bologna, 2006.
- "Wolfango. Grandi dipinti" (1986), "Aggiunte a Wolfango" (1991), "Giocattoli vecchi nuovi, far la pasta in cucina e altro" (2004), in Wolfango (catalogo della mostra di Bologna), Bonomia University Press, Bologna, 2008.
- "Antiraphael. Tre contrasti circa la lingua italiana dell'arte", in Amico Aspertini 1474-1552. Artista bizzarro nell'eta di Dürer e Raffaello (catalogo mostra di Bologna), Silvana Editoriale, Cinisello Balsamo, 2008.
- Bologna narrata, Poligrafici Editoriale S.p.A., Bologna, 2010.
- Giacomo De Maria. Dodici pensieri fatti con le mani, Bonomia University Press, Bologna, 2010.
