= June Jackson Christmas =

American psychiatrist (1924–2023)

June Jackson Christmas (June 7, 1924 – December 31, 2023) was an American psychiatrist. She served as New York City Commissioner of Mental Health and Mental Retardation Services, member of President Jimmy Carter transition team, the beneficiary of Human-Services Award, the founder of a community psychiatric program in Harlem - Harlem Rehabilitation Center. Christmas served as a member of Governor Mario Cuomo's Advisory Committee on Black Affairs.

Christmas served as vice-president of the American Psychiatric Association and the president of the Public Health Association of NYC. In 1999, she received the Lifetime Achievement Award by the National Medical Fellowships. She also was a member of Vassar's Board of Trustees from 1978 to 1989. She was an executive director of the Urban Issues Group, an organization with focus on issues specific to New Yorkers of African descent.

== Early life and education ==
June Jackson Christmas was born in Cambridge, Massachusetts on June 7, 1924. She experienced racism during her childhood, including being denied a prize for selling the most Girl Scout cookies, denied entrance to a roller skating rink, and denied membership in the National Honor Society despite being class salutatorian.

Christmas was one of the first Black students admitted to Vassar College, where she graduated with a B.S. in zoology. She then earned a medical degree from Boston University School of Medicine. She also earned a certificate in psychoanalysis from the William Alanson White Institute.

== Career ==
Christmas left private practice to set up the Harlem Hospital Rehabilitation Center and to teach at Columbia University. Her achievements with the Rehabilitation Center were later honored with awards:

- in 1974 with Human Services Award
- in 1976 with Award for Excellence in the Field of Domestic Health of the American Public Health Association

Christmas was appointed Commissioner of Mental Health and Mental Retardation Services on August 16, 1972, by New York Mayor John Lindsay. In 1976 she was part of the Jimmy Carter presidential campaign as a health advisor, and subsequently as part the Carter transition team, leading the transition of the Department of Health, Education and Welfare from Republican to Democratic hands. In 1978 Mayor Ed Koch reappointed Christmas as the city's Commissioner of Mental Health, Mental Retardation.

== Personal life and death ==
Christmas and her husband Walter had three children and four grandchildren. She died of heart failure in The Bronx, New York City, on December 31, 2023, at the age of 99.
