= Kojiro Nakamura =

Japanese scholar of Islam (1936–2023)

Kojiro Nakamura (中村 廣治郎, Nakamura Kōjirō; 1936 – 5 December 2023) was a Japanese scholar of Islam. He was professor emeritus of Islamic studies at both Tokyo University and Oberlin University. Tokyo University's Department of Islamic Studies was the first such department in Japan, established in 1982 with Nakamura appointed its first professor.

Nakamura translated and commented on portions of Al-Ghazali's Revival of Religious Sciences, his most important work, for the Islamic Texts Society in 1992. Much of Nakamura's effort had been spent on analysis of al-Ghazali's works, a number of which Nakamura has translated to the Japanese language. Nakamura's Islam and Modernity also focuses on what he held are four main streams of modern Islamic thought in order to frame Islamic studies within the wider field of religious studies. He also served as a conference chair at the first al-Manar conference organised by Routledge.

Nakamura received his PhD from Harvard University in 1970.

Nakamura died from a subdural hematoma on 5 December 2023, at the age of 87.
