= Paul Chevigny =

American lawyer and author (– 2023)

Paul G. Chevigny (1934/1935 – December 11, 2023) was an American lawyer and author. He was the Anne and Joel Ehrenkranz Professor of Law Emeritus at the New York University School of Law. He graduated from Yale College and Harvard Law School.

== Books ==
- Police Power: Police Abuses in New York City (1969)
- Cops and Rebels (1972)
- More Speech: Dialogue Rights and Modern Liberty
