= Darryl Cowie =

Australian rules footballer (1961–2023)

Personal information
- Full name: Darryl Cowie
- Born: 15 March 1961
- Died: 19 December 2023 (aged 62)
- Original team: Central Districts (SANFL)
- Height: 196 cm (6 ft 5 in)
- Weight: 90 kg (198 lb)
- Position: Ruck

Playing career^{1}
Years	Club	Games (Goals)
1979-81	Central Districts	40 (13)
1982–85	St Kilda	56 (8)
1986–87	Richmond	7 (1)
Total		103 (22)

Representative team honours
Years	Team	Games (Goals)
1981	South Australia	1 (1)
- ^{1} Playing statistics correct to the end of 1987.

Darryl Cowie (15 March 1961 – 19 December 2023) was an Australian rules footballer who played with St Kilda and Richmond in the Victorian Football League (VFL) and Central Districts in the South Australian National Football League (SANFL).

A ruckman, Cowie was recruited from South Australian Amateur Football League club Gawler Central and made his senior SANFL debut in 1979.

Cowie died on 19 December 2023, at the age of 62.

== Sources ==
- Hornsey, A. (ed.) (1980) Football Times Year Book 1980, South Australian National Football League: Adelaide.
