= Harvey S. Leff =

American physicist and physics teacher (1937–2023)

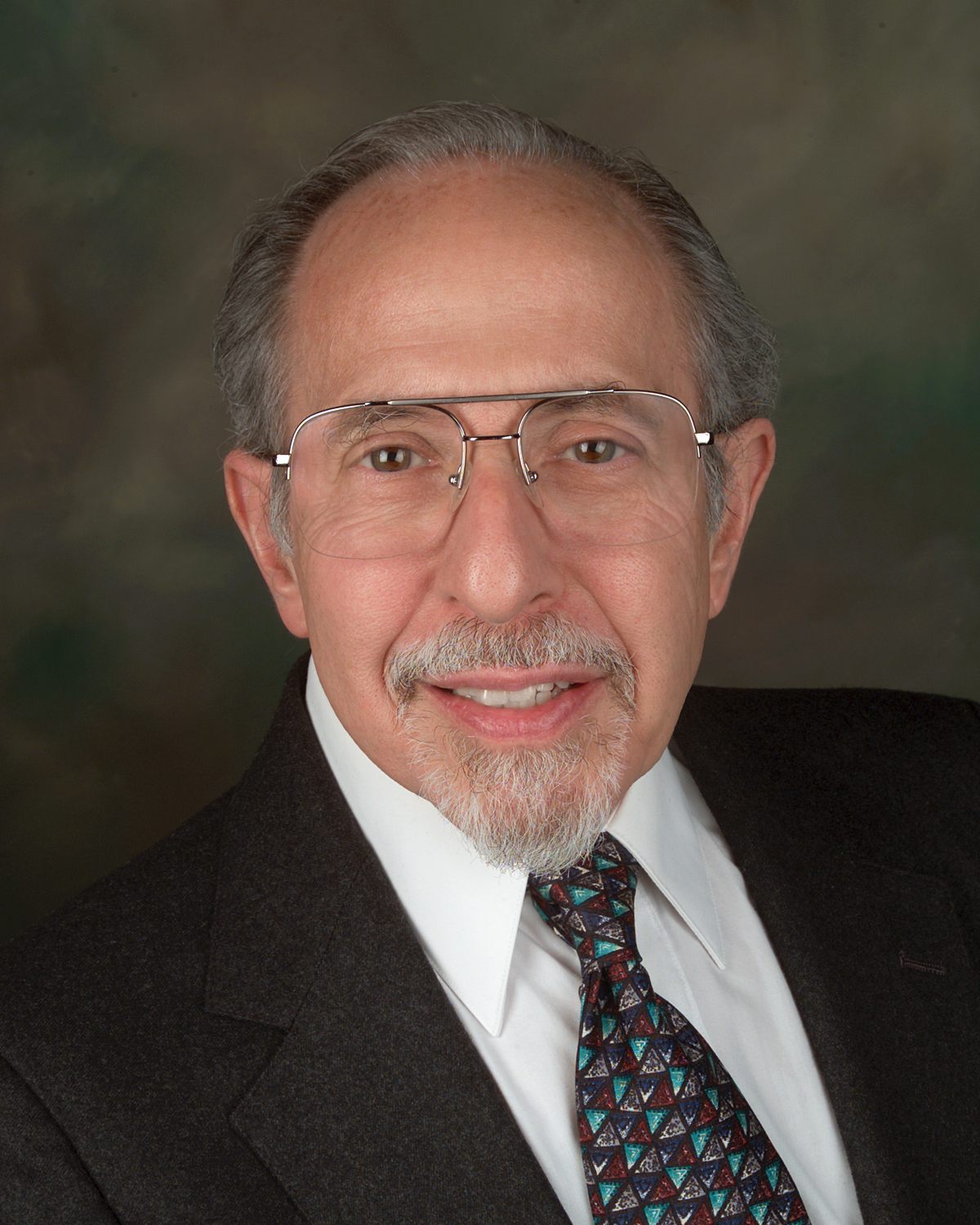
- Born: July 24, 1937; Chicago, Illinois, U.S.
- Died: December 30, 2023 (aged 86); Portland, Oregon, U.S.
- Known for: Physics, focusing on: energy, entropy, Maxwell's demon, and the foundations of thermodynamics.

Harvey S. Leff (July 24, 1937 – December 30, 2023) was an American physicist and physics teacher who is known primarily for his research and expository articles in physics, focusing on energy, entropy, Maxwell's demon, and the foundations of thermodynamics. He introduced the 'energy spreading' metaphor for entropy change. Leff died on December 30, 2023, at the age of 86.

== Career ==
Leff was a faculty member at the Case Institute of Technology and Case Western Reserve University, Chicago State University, Harvey Mudd College and was a scientist and energy policy analyst at the Institute for Energy Analysis at Oak Ridge Associated Universities. For most of his career, he was professor at California State Polytechnic University-Pomona. In 2010, he became a visiting scholar at Reed College.

== Publications ==
Leff was author of a monograph on energy and entropy, co-edited two editions of a book on Maxwell's demon, published research articles, and a website on energy and entropy.

== Honors ==
Leff was a Fellow of the American Association of Physics Teachers and a Fellow of the American Physical Society. He was an associate editor and consulting editor for the American Journal of Physics, and was president of the American Association of Physics Teachers.
