= Beatriz Abril de Leal =

Colombian lawyer and politician (1939–2023)

Governor of Meta Department
- In office 25 August 1983 – 16 August 1984

Personal details
- Born: 1939 Colombia
- Died: 16 December 2023 (aged 84) Villavicencio, Colombia
- Party: Liberal
- Occupation: Lawyer, politician

Beatriz Abril de Leal (1939 – 16 December 2023) was a Colombian lawyer and politician.

A member of the Colombian Liberal Party, Abril de Leal was the first female governor of the Meta Department from 25 August 1983 to 16 August 1984. She died on 16 December 2023 at the Servimedicos Clinic in Villavicencio, at the age of 84.
