= Jacqueline Mesmaeker =

Belgian plastic artist (1929–2023)

- Born: 1929; Uccle, Belgium
- Died: 7 December 2023 (aged 93); Brussels, Belgium
- Occupation: Artist

Jacqueline Mesmaeker (1929 – 7 December 2023) was a Belgian artist who worked in plastic. She died in Brussels on 7 December 2023, at the age of 93.

After working in fashion, architecture and design for two decades in her early career, Mesmaeker redirected her practice towards visual arts at the beginning of the 1970s.

== Exhibitions ==
- Hôtel Van de Velde - ENSAAV, Brussels (1975)
- Hôtel Van de Velde - ENSAAV, Brussels (1976)
- Une Serre, Botanical Garden of Brussels (1977)
- La Couleur et la Ville, ISELP, Jeunesse et Arts Plastiques, Brussels (1978)
- Aktuele Kunst in Belgïe, Inzicht/overzicht – overzicht/inzicht, Museum of Fine Arts, Ghent (1979)
- La Grande Absente, Musée d'Ixelles (1979)
- Bru '81 Trans Art Express, ISACF, Brussels (1981)
- Transparence et Lumière, Le Botanique, Brussels (1984)
- Tectonic '84 Musée d'Architecture, Liège (1984)
- Articulture, Parc du Musée Royal, Mariemont (1985)
- Place Saint-Lambert Investigations, Espace 251 Nord, Liège (1985)
- Maison de la Culture, Tournai (1986)
- Initatief d'Amis, Vooruit, Ghent (1986)
- Arte in Situazione Belgica, Espace 251 Nord – Academia Belgica, Rome (1987)
- États Limites, Archives des Passions, Espace 251 Nord, Liège (1988)
- Belgicismes, Espace 251 Nord – Casa Frollo, Venice (1988)
- Onbegrensd Beeld, Augustijnenkerk, Maastricht (1989)
- Antwerpen-Haarlem, Frans Hals Museum, Haarlem (1990)
- Matériau Photo – Un certain Regard Pictural, Galerie Guy Ledune, Brussels (1991)
- Identification, Musée d'Art Ancien, Brussels (1991)
- Le Jardin de la Vierge, Espace 251 Nord, Liège et Place Royale, Brussels (1993)
- A Sentimental Journey, Atelier Sainte Anne, Brussels (1996)
- East International, Sainsbury Center for Visual Arts, Norwich Gallery, Norwich (1996)
- Slight, Norwich Gallery, Norwich (1997)
- Magritte en Compagnie. Du bon usage de l'irrévérence, Galerie Zachęta, Warsaw (1997)
- Secret Outlines, Collective Gallery, Edinburgh (1998)
- Restez Calmes, La Glacière de Liège, Liège (1999)
- Super ∞, Lycée Claude Forest, Maubeuge (1999)
- Speelhoven 99, Woonhuis, Speelhoven (1999)
- Pièces à conviction, Espace 251 Nord, Liège (2000)
- World Wild Flags, Liège (2000)
- Intervalles, Chappelle de Monty (2000)
- N.I.C.C. television program-telenicc 1’, Bruxelles Euro 2000
- Instabilité, Institut Saint-Luc, Brussels (2001)
- Ici et maintenant, Belgian System, Tour & Taxi, Brussels (2001)
- Tout juste Instable, Libraire Quartier Latin, Brussels (2002)
- Festival International du Film, Argos, Bruxelles (2002)
- Miscellaneous - Jacqueline Mesmaeker, Benoit Platéus, La Raffinerie/Plan-K, Brussels (2002)
- Refuge, La Raffinerie/Plan-K (2003)
- V 1. 1944 Héritage de l'Ermitage Herinneringen aan de Kluizenaars, Galerie-1 CIVA, Brussels (2005)
- Biennale de la Photographie, Film en projection dans le Chœur de l'Église Saint André, Liège (2006)
- Ici… et là, Librairie Quartier Latin, Brussels (2008)
- Le miroir et les chemins, Mac's, Grand-Hornu (2012)
- Repeat/repeat, Galerie Nadja Vilenne, Liège (2013)
- Conversation Piece, Mu.Zee, Ostende (2013)
- L’image suivante, Mac's, Grand Hornu (2014)
- Allegory of the Cave Painting, Extra City, Antwerp (2014)
- Off(icielle) FIAC 2014 – Les Docks, Galerie Nadja Vilenne, Paris (2014)
- La Mer – Salut d’honneur Jan Hoet, Mu.ZEE, Ostende (2014)
- A Breathcrystal', Project ArtsCentre, Dublin (2015)
- Why are you Angry, Stedelijk Museum voor Actuele Kunst, Ghent (2021)

== Publications ==
- De page en page, Pendants et vis en France (1990)
- Miscellaneous (2002)
- Après lecture des Mémoires d'Outre-tombe (2005)
- I'm a Foot Fan (2006)
- Until it Fitted! L'innocence (2010)
- Jacqueline Mesmaeker. Œuvres 1975-2011 (2011)

== DVD ==
- Les Péripéties (2010)
