= Harold Osher =

American cardiologist and philanthropist

- Osher in 2011
- Born: January 11, 1924; Portland, Maine
- Died: December 23, 2023 (aged 99)
- Occupations: cardiologist, philanthropist
- Known for: Osher Map Library

Harold L. Osher (January 11, 1924 - December 23, 2023) was an American cardiologist, philanthropist, and map collector.

== Early life and education ==
Osher was born in Portland, Maine to Leah Lazarovich Osher and Samuel Osher (née Osherowitz) one of five children. He grew up in Biddeford working at his parents' hardware store. He graduated from Biddeford High School. He attended Bowdoin College and received medical training at Boston University School of Medicine. He married Peggy Liberman and the couple moved back to Maine where he opened a private practice. They had four children.

== Career ==
Osher was a cardiologist. He served as director of Maine Medical Center's division of cardiology and held faculty appointments at several New England medical schools. He was the president of the Maine chapter of the American Heart Association.

== Map collecting ==
As he approached retirement, Osher began collecting maps in 1974, an interest which he had had since childhood. He and his wife had traveled to London and she had convinced him to purchase a historic map which became the beginnings of their collection.

The collection he accumulated with his wife, 10,000 maps cataloged by Osher, became "one of the finest map collections in the world." Chromolithography was a particular interest area in which Osher collected. Osher and his wife Peggy donated their collection to the University of Southern Maine in 1989 after another donation by Eleanor Houston Smith who had her own extensive collection. They stipulated that the maps "not only be used for teaching at the university and in educational outreach programs for public schools but be made accessible to the general public."

This donation, combined with USM's existing collections and additional resources provided by the Oshers, became the Osher Map Library and Smith Center for Cartographic Education in 1994. In 2012 Osher was awarded the International Map Collectors’ Society Helen Wallis Award. In 2018, Osher formally turned over the remainder of his and his wife's entire collection to the Osher Map Library, a collection "loosely valued at $100 million." As of 2024, the collection had half a million items with over 75,000 available in digitized format.
