= Valery Lagunov =

Russian choreographer (1942–2023)

- Валерий Лагунов
- Born: 2 June 1942; Moscow, Russian SFSR, USSR
- Died: 18 December 2023 (aged 81)
- Education: Moscow State Academy of Choreography; Russian Institute of Theatre Arts
- Occupation: Choreographer
- Years active: 1962–2023
- Honours: Merited Artist of the Russian Federation (1976)

Valery Stepanovich Lagunov (Russian: Валерий Степанович Лагунов; 2 June 1942 – 18 December 2023) was a Soviet and Russian ballet dancer and choreographer.

== Biography ==
Valery Stepanovich Lagunov was born in Moscow, Russian SFSR, USSR. In 1962 he graduated from the Moscow State Choreographic Academy where his teacher was Aleksey Yermolayev, and same year joined Bolshoi Ballet. He first appeared in Scriabiniana as Garland in 1962 and next year played in The Sleeping Beauty as Prince. In 1966 he played one of the shepherd boys in the Nutcracker and five years later appeared as Archon in Icarus. In 1972 he participated in the Swan Lake where he played a role of the evil genius and the same year played a role as a dance teacher in Cinderella. Three years later he appeared as Albrecht in Giselle and by 1976 had played in Mozart and Salieri. The same year he was named Honored Artist of the RSFSR and also appeared as Don Juan in Love for Love.

In 1979, he graduated from the Russian University of Theatre Arts and retired as a dancer in 1983. Since 1996, he had taught future ballet dancers, such as Mikhail Lobukhin and Vladislav Lantratov. Lagunov died on 18 December 2023, at the age of 81.
