= Red Paden =

American juke joint owner (1956–2023)

Red Paden (November 27, 1956 – December 30, 2023) was an American juke joint owner. He was the owner of Red’s Lounge in Clarksdale, Mississippi, one of the "last places in the United States to offer authentic Delta blues in its natural setting" according to The New York Times. Paden died on December 30, 2023, at the age of 67.
