= Eduard Khamitov =

Russian politician (1937–2023)

Eduard Khamitov (22 September 1937 – 28 December 2023) was a Russian scientist and politician. He was an MP from 2005 to 2007. Khamitov died on 28 December 2023, at the age of 86.
