= Ramzi T. Salamé =

Lebanese writer and painter (1953–2023)

Ramzi Toufic Salamé (17 July 1953 – 29 December 2023) was a Lebanese writer and painter.

== Biography ==
Salamé's parents were Lebanese immigrants in Liberia, but his early years were spent in Lebanon. He studied management studies at the American University of Beirut and law at the Saint Joseph University.

Salamé died on 29 December 2023, at the age of 70.

== Literary career ==
Salamé wrote the following works in French. They have been translated into Arabic.

- Le Prince des cyniques, édition FMA, Buchet Chastel, 1999
- Trésor, édition FMA, 2003
- La pierre m'a parlé, édition FMA, L'Harmattan, 2005
- La Caste supérieure, édition FMA, L'Harmattan, 2007
- La République des Paysans, édition FMA, L'Harmattan, 2011

His novels criticize a society dominated by selfishness and careerism where man is managed by his instincts of power and domination. His writing is "simple and straightforward. He relies heavily on dialogue to convey his ideas, rather than narration or description". His work is a historical study in the guise of a novel.

Salamé listed Gerard Mordillat, Sun Tse, Jacques Baudouin and Guillaume Musso as his literary influences.

== Art ==
Salamé's paintings depict serene nature in cheerful and lively colors, in a personal and naive style. He exhibited in Lebanon, Paris, Switzerland and Belgium.
