= Lech Konopiński =

Polish poet and writer (1931–2023)

- Born: 16 March 1931; Poznań
- Died: 13 December 2023 (aged 92)
- Citizenship: Poland
- Education: Higher Economic School
- Occupations: Writer, poet
- Writing career
- Notable awards: Gloria Artis Medal for Merit to Culture, Order of the Smile

Lech Konopiński (16 March 1931 – 13 December 2023) was a Polish poet and writer. Born in Poznań on 16 March 1931, he died on 13 December 2023, at the age of 92.

== Publications ==
- Akcje i reakcje
- Amoreski
- Diabelskie sztuczki
- Bajeczne historie
- Pawie oczka
- Alfabet amora
- Co pełza i hasa po polach i lasach
- Figlarne listki
- Śmieszne pretensje
- Z kwiatka na kwiatek
- Zwierzątka i zwierzęta na sześciu kontynentach
- Książę Lech i druhów trzech
- Od bieguna do bieguna
- Przez dżungle i pustynie
- Skrzydełka Erosa
- Konopiński dzieciom
- Tutaj hasa nasza klasa
- Tak się kręci świat zwierzęcy
- Oczarowani limerykami
