= Franco Cozzo =

Australian businessman (1935–2023)

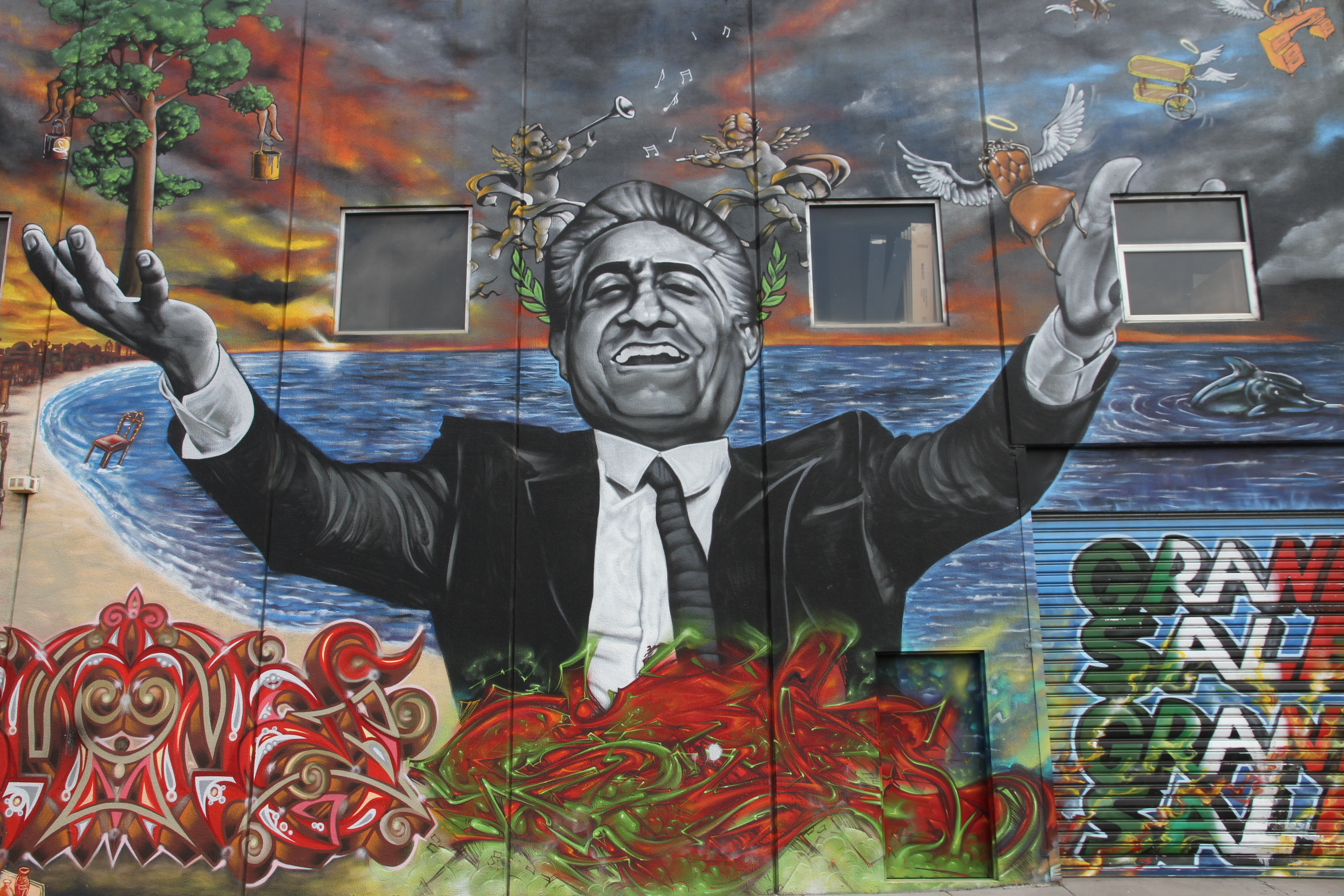
- Mural of Cozzo on the side of his Footscray premises
- Born: 2 October 1935; Ramacca, Italy
- Died: 20 December 2023 (aged 88); Melbourne, Victoria, Australia
- Occupation: Businessman
- Years active: 1955–2023
- Spouse: Assunta
- Children: 10

Franco Cozzo (2 October 1935 – 20 December 2023) was an Italian-Australian businessman. After moving to Melbourne from Sicily in 1955, Cozzo became known for his television advertisements, in which he would speak in English, Greek, and Italian. He later produced Australia's first non-English TV show, Carosello, which was broadcast in Italian.

Cozzo was a local celebrity in Melbourne, especially the suburb of Footscray, for over 50 years, and was a prominent ethnic minority TV personality of the era in Victoria.

== Biography ==
Born in 1935, Cozzo grew up with his family in Sicily, where his father was a horse trader. When Cozzo was 12, his younger sister died of a heart attack.

After migrating to Australia in January 1956, Cozzo initially worked as a door-to-door salesman selling baroque furniture and other products. His first shop in North Melbourne also sold whitegoods, and he also briefly had a Fiat dealership.

In the late 1960s, Cozzo produced a TV show featuring local Italian-Australian musical acts on Channel 0, which he used as an advertising space for his furniture business. This was the first non-English Australian TV show, pre-dating ethnic broadcasting on the government's Special Broadcasting Service by more than a decade. Around this time, he also purchased what would become his flagship store in Footscray.

In 1981, Cozzo was awarded a plaque by the local council in recognition of his contribution to the local community.

== Personal life and death ==
Cozzo divorced his first wife during the 1980s. He remarried and had further children with his second wife.

Cozzo's son, Luigi, was jailed in 1992 for drug trafficking, alleged to have imported cocaine hidden in his father's furniture shipments.

Cozzo died at his home in Melbourne on 20 December 2023, at the age of 88.

== Legacy ==
Cozzo was a local celebrity in his adoptive home of Melbourne (especially the suburb of Footscray, which he pronounced distinctively as Footisgray in his TV adverts) thanks to his distinctive Italian accent and trilingual ads. He was one of the most prominent ethnic TV personalities prior to the launch of the government-funded Special Broadcasting Service.

Norda Melbin E Footisgray by Tony Cursio is a stereotypically Italian tune with lyrics based on Cozzo's television advertisements, recorded during the 1980s.

Cozzo was the subject of Palazzo di Cozzo, a biographical documentary film about his life and experiences as an Italian-Australian businessman from the 1950s to 2020s.
