= Yevgeniy Perventsev =

Soviet politician (1926–2023)

Yevgeniy Ivanovich Perventsev (Russian: Евгений Иванович Первенцев; 22 June 1926 – 14 December 2023) was a Soviet and Russian government official. He was the head of the KGB of the Tajik SSR from 1975 to 1985. He died on 14 December 2023, at the age of 97.
