= Adriano Marques de Magallanes =

Spanish businessman and politician (1925–2023)

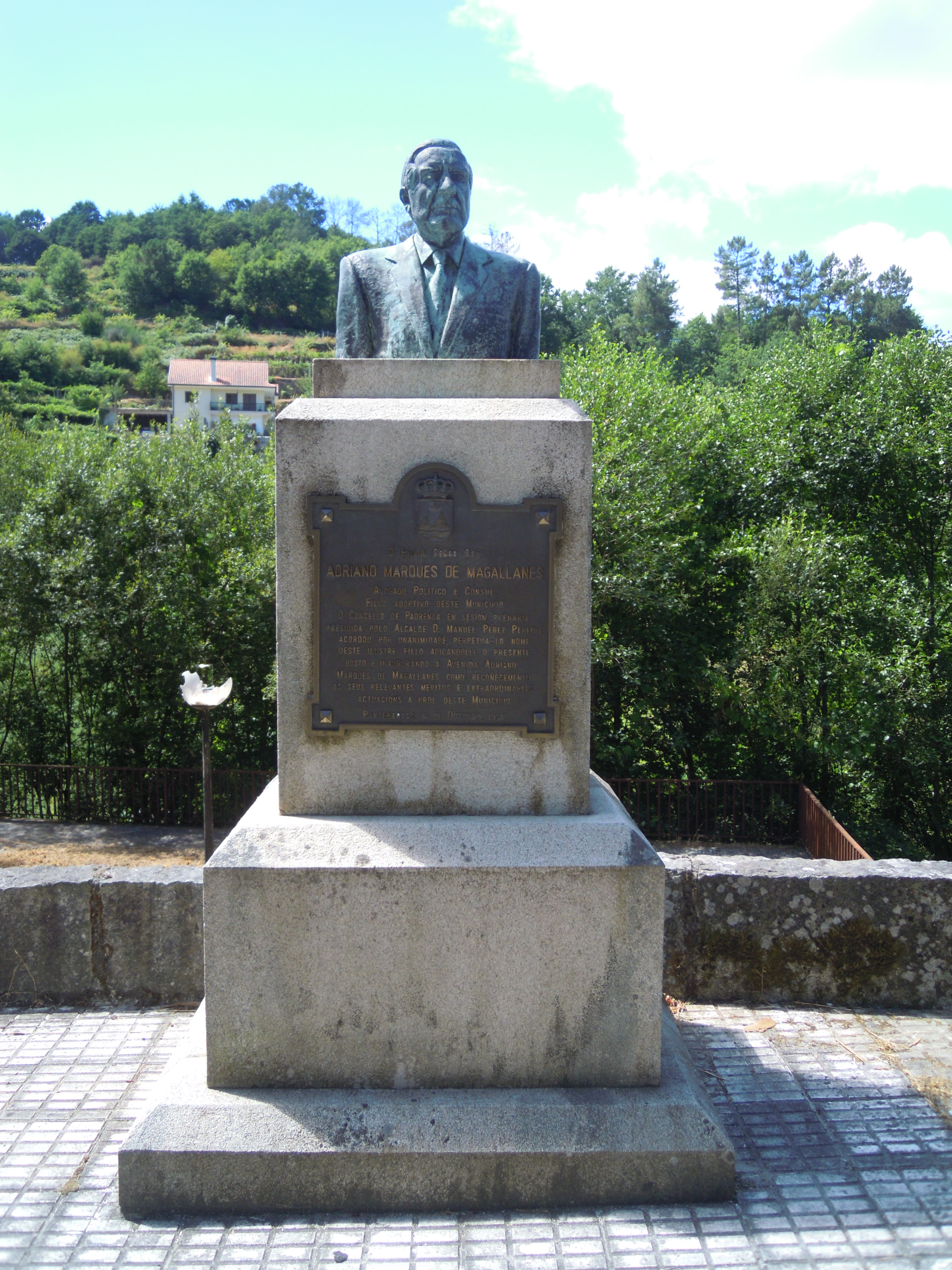
- A bust of Magallanes in Padrenda

Member of the Congress of Deputies for Pontevedra
- In office 16 December 1986 – 2 September 1989
- Preceded by: Mariano Rajoy

Member of the Senate of Spain for Pontevedra
- In office 14 January 1998 – 18 January 2000
- Preceded by: Manuel Pérez Álvarez

Personal details
- Born: Adriano Antonio Marques de Magallanes; 10 July 1925 Melgaço, Portugal
- Died: 12 December 2023 (aged 98) A Cañiza, Spain
- Party: PPdeG
- Occupation: Businessman

Adriano Antonio Marques de Magallanes (10 July 1925 – 12 December 2023) was a Spanish businessman and politician. A member of the People's Party of Galicia, he served in the Congress of Deputies from 1986 to 1989 and the Senate from 1998 to 2000.

Marques died in A Cañiza on 12 December 2023, at the age of 98.
