= Edwin Amidon =

American politician (1934–2023)

Member of the Vermont House of Representatives from the Chittenden 1-2 district
- In office 2000–2004

Personal details
- Born: December 8, 1934 Syracuse, New York, U.S.
- Died: December 26, 2023 (aged 89)
- Party: Republican
- Education: Williams College; Harvard Law School

Edwin Henry Amidon Jr. (December 8, 1934 – December 26, 2023) was an American politician. He served as a Republican member for the Chittenden 1-2 district of the Vermont House of Representatives from 2000 to 2004. Amidon died on December 26, 2023, at the age of 89.
