= Stefano Menicacci =

Italian politician (1931–2023)

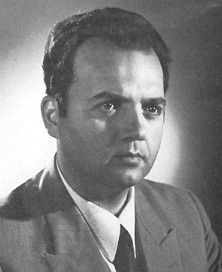
Menicacci in 1976

Stefano Menicacci (4 October 1931 – 4 December 2023) was an Italian politician. He was a deputy from 1968 to 1979. Menicacci was born on 4 October 1931 in Foligno, and died on 4 December 2023, at the age of 92.
