= Ezan Akélé =

Ivorian politician (died 2023)

- Akélé in 2021

Minister of Equipment, Transport and Telecommunications
- In office 7 November 1990 – 22 October 1995
- Preceded by: Bamba Vamoussa
- Succeeded by: Théophile Ahoua N'Doli

Personal details
- Born: 1937 or 1938
- Died: 1 December 2023 (aged 85) Paris, France
- Party: PDCI

Ezan Akélé (1937 or 1938 – 1 December 2023) was an Ivorian politician of the Democratic Party of Ivory Coast (PDCI).

== Career ==
Akélé served as Minister of Equipment, Transport and Telecommunications under Prime Ministers Alassane Ouattara and Daniel Kablan Duncan.

== Death ==
Akélé died in Paris on 1 December 2023, at the age of 85.
