= Kariman Hamza =

Egyptian journalist and presenter (1942–2023)

- Born: 8 February 1942
- Died: 31 December 2023 (aged 81)
- Education: Cairo University
- Occupations: Media personality, news presenter
- Father: Abdel Latif Hamza

Kariman Hamza (8 February 1942 – 31 December 2023) was an Egyptian journalist and presenter. She worked in religious programs on television from 1970 to 1999. Her father is Abdel Latif Hamza, professor of journalism at the Faculty of Information. She was the first veiled broadcaster on Egyptian television.

== Death ==
Kariman Hamza he died on December 31, 2023 and go to afterlife

== Biography ==
Hamza began her work by presenting a program for children entitled “The Qur’an of My Lord.” She presented more than 1,500 television episodes over the course of her long history with various Islamic religious scholars, including Sheikh Yusuf Al-Qaradawi, Sheikh Muhammad Al-Ghazali, and Sheikh Muhammad Metwally Al-Shaarawi, in addition to writing many books, including: من أجل الله, زامري, نيجار And الغابة سيد الخلق. It also presented many programs such as: الرضا والنور، بالحق أنزلنا، وبالحق نزل، كلمة طيبة.

Hamza wrote the encyclopedia “أناقة و حشمة,” which displays some of the elegant clothes of veiled women, and gave the desired image of veiled women’s clothing. She worked on the Iqra TV channel and provided an interpretation of the Qur’an for young people under the title “تفسير القرآن الواضح للشباب.”
