= Wing Generator =

Public sculpture in Indiana

- Artist: Richard Hunt
- Year: 1982-2010
- Type: welded corten steel
- Dimensions: 149.86 cm × 121.92 cm × 152.4 cm (149.86 cm × 121.92 cm × 152.4 cm)
- Location: University of Notre Dame, Notre Dame, Indiana, United States; 41°41′36″N 86°13′57″W
- Owner: University of Notre Dame, Snite Museum of Art

Wing Generator is an outdoor sculpture by the Chicago-born sculptor Richard Hunt (b. 1935). Wing Generator is located on the University of Notre Dame Campus in Notre Dame, Kundan

IN, near the city of South Bend, and is owned by the Snite Museum of Art of the University of Notre Dame. The large sculpture of corroded steel incorporates an abstract wing shape formed of several smaller sculpted pieces on top of a rectangular base.

== Description ==
Wing Generator is an outdoor sculpture featuring smaller abstract sculpted pieces implicative of industrial and biomorphic forms welded together to form a larger shape evocative of a wing. The largest piece of Wing Generator extends approximately three feet from the center of the sculpture while a smaller spade-shaped piece extends one foot from the center in the opposite direction. A distinct gear shape can be found on the lower right side of the object if one is facing the sculpture head-on. The sculpture is mounted on a large podium with a rectangular base. The base and sculpture are made out of corten steel pieces welded together, which have been artificially corroded to appear highly rusted. The sculpture measures 59 x 48 x 60’’.

== Historical information ==
Wing Generator (1980) was originally conceived as a gravesite monument commissioned for Hunt's deceased friend Hobart Taylor Jr. through his will. According to Hunt, Wing Generator is a hybridization of the winged sculptures of Nike, the deity of victory, found in Greco-Roman sculpture such as the famous Winged Victory of Samothrace, and the avian motifs found on the iron staffs of the Yoruba culture in Africa. Hunt owned several Yoruba staffs in his private collection of African art, the forms of which he strove to replicate in Wing Generator. Hunt has also stated that the theme of victory in the work can be extended to the Christian idea of the victory of life after death. The theme of victory was employed in the sculpture to symbolize the victories of Taylor during his career as a civic lawyer. The various sculpted forms of mechanical appearance found in Wing Generator, contributing to the Generator aspect of its title, relate to Taylor's involvement in cases surrounding General Electric, U.S. Steel, and Eastern Airlines. Hunt made a replica of the sculpture, later sold to the Snite Museum of Art at the University of Notre Dame [1].

=== Location history ===
In 2010, the Snite Museum of Art contacted Richard Hunt in order to express their interest in purchasing one of his sculptures.[2] Other works by Hunt owned by the Snite Museum of Art include Hybrid Form (1986), Untitled (1968), Standing Form #5 (1962), and Natural Form (1969).[3] The sculpture is one of five contemporary sculptures (George Rickey's Two Lines Oblique, Deborah Butterfield's Tracery, Stephen DeStaebler's Single Winged Figure on Plinth and Peter Randall-Page's Little Seed comprising the other four works) curated for the Charles B. Hayes Sculpture Park that would be completed in the late fall of 2012.[4] Wing Generator was purchased in September 2010 for $70,000.[5] Before delivering the sculpture to the Snite Museum, Hunt attached the sculpture to a large rectangular base that placed the work approximately three feet above ground in order to allow for a higher degree of air circulation through the steel pieces of the sculpture to maximize the health and longevity of the corten steel.[6] The changes to the sculpture were completed September 20 and the work was placed in the Charles B. Hayes Sculpture Park upon the park's completion.[7]

In July 2014, Wing Generator suffered severe damage from a falling tree during a thunderstorm. The proper right side of the sculpture was crushed; the metal pieces were folded over one another, the center was turned counterclockwise upon the base, and several of the welds were broken.[8] Hunt visited the University of Notre Dame to access the damage of the piece and to provide a list of materials that would be needed for its repair.[9] Wing Generator was sent to McKay Lodge Conservation Laboratory in Oberlin, Ohio for repairs that were completed the following September 2015.[10] Since the return of the repaired sculpture to campus, the Snite Museum of Art has kept the work in the museum's courtyard, as opposed to the sculpture park, in order to protect Wing Generator from further damage from the current landscaping and construction taking place in the park.

=== Acquisition ===
On September 17, 2010, the University of Notre Dame purchased Wing Generator from the artist himself for $70,000.[11] This purchase price was suggested by Richard Raymond Alasko from the American Society of Appraisers (ASA) in August 2010 and was accepted by both the Hunt and the Snite Museum.[12] A smaller maquette of the sculpture by Hunt, Maquette for Wing Generator, was purchased immediately before the larger sculpture.[13] The work was part of a collection of sculpture acquired by the museum to fill the Charles B. Hayes Sculpture Park, completed in 2012 and situated on the edge of campus near the Compton Family Ice Arena and Eddy Street Commons.[14] Within the collection of the Snite Museum of Art, Wing Generator received the accession number 2010.030. Wing Generator is credited as a gift from Judith H. Kinney of St. Joseph, Michigan.[15] The current monetary value of Wing Generator is unknown the Snite Museum of Art has not conducting a reappraisal of the sculpture as of 2016.[16]

== Artist ==
Richard Hunt is a celebrated African-American sculptor born in 1935 in Chicago, IL. He attended the School of the Art Institute of Chicago where he received his B.A.E. in 1957. In 1962, Hunt was the youngest artist exhibited at the Seattle World's Fair, and in 1971, Hunt became the first African-American sculptor to receive a retrospective exhibition of his work at the Museum of Modern Art in New York. Hunt has received a series of 15 international fellowships and awards, 14 honorary degrees, and has completed professorships and artist residencies at 21 universities in the United States. His sculptures can be found in the Art Institute of Chicago, the National Gallery and National Museum of American Art in Washington, DC, and the Metropolitan Museum of Art and the Museum of Modern Art in New York. [17] William S. Liberman (art critic and previous director of MoMa) declared Hunt to be, “one of America’s foremost living sculptors.”[18]

Hunt has described his work as following the sculptural movement of “direct metal” and “open form” sculpture resonating in the 1950s, these types of sculptures featuring open interiors, negative spaces within the object, and various linear planes often projecting from the center of the object. Hunt uses raw industrial materials, particularly steel, to create his sculptures. He avoids coating his works with chemical patinas so as to primacy the rough, corroded appearance of the steel. It is typical of a Hunt sculpture to show welding lines and discolorations from the forgery in order to draw the viewer's attention to his artistic process and craft. In addition to being placed in the context of Abstract Expressionism due to his use of unworked materials, Hunt as also been understood by art historians in the context of Surrealism as several of his sculptures feature an outlandish combination of industrial and biomorphic forms such as gears, wheels, and machinery pieces juxtaposed to metal forms resembling antennae, wings, and insect legs.[19]

== Condition ==
The current condition of Wing Generator has no further structural damages as of 2016. In July 2014, Wing Generator received severe damage from a falling tree (see Location History). The sculpture was sent to McKay Lodge Conservation Laboratory in Ohio where the sculpture was separated into various portions. The portions were reshaped using an oxyacetylene torch and a forge. The portions were then reassembled using Corton welding wire. The welds were chased back to match the contours of the original sculpture, and the entire sculpture was then artificially corroded in order to obtain its original orange-colored, heavily rusted surface. The price of these conservation treatments and repairs amounted to $27,432. [20]
