= Valery Vishnichenko =

Kazakh politician (1949–2023)

- Валерий Вишниченко
- Vishnichenko in 2020

Member of the Mäjilis
- In office 27 August 2007 – 16 December 2011

Personal details
- Born: 1 February 1949 Kosoba, Komsomolskiy District, Kostanay Region, Kazakh SSR, Soviet Union
- Died: 3 December 2023 (aged 74)
- Party: Nur Otan
- Education: Kostanay State Pedagogical Institute
- Occupation: Schoolteacher

Valery Georgievich Vishnichenko (Russian: Валерий Георгиевич Вишниченко; 1 February 1949 – 3 December 2023) was a Kazakh schoolteacher and politician. A member of Nur Otan, he served in the Mäjilis from 2007 to 2011.

Vishnichenko died on 3 December 2023, at the age of 74.
