= Abdelhafid Kadiri =

Moroccan politician (1927–2023)

Minister of Youth and Sport
- In office 10 October 1977 – 5 October 1981
- Preceded by: Mohamed Arsalane El Jadidi
- Succeeded by: Abdelouahed Belkeziz

Personal details
- Born: 1927
- Died: 11 December 2023 (aged 96)
- Party: Istiqlal Party

Abdelhafid Kadiri (1927 – 11 December 2023) was a Moroccan politician of the Istiqlal Party.

Kadiri served as Secretary of State for Agriculture in the government of President of the Governing Council Ahmed Balafrej. He was Minister of Youth and Sport under Prime Minister Maati Bouabid from 1977 to 1981.

Kadiri died on 11 December 2023, at the age of 96.
