= Gérard Bramoullé =

French economist and politician (1944–2023)

Member of the Municipal Council of Aix-en-Provence
- In office 23 March 2014 – 17 July 2020

Member of the Council of the Aix-Marseille-Provence Metropolis
- In office 1 January 2016 – 1 December 2023

Personal details
- Born: 17 December 1944 Aix-en-Provence, France
- Died: 1 December 2023 (aged 78)
- Party: LR
- Education: Paris-Sorbonne University; Sciences Po
- Occupation: Economist

Gérard Bramoullé (17 December 1944 – 1 December 2023) was a French economist and politician of The Republicans (LR). He also taught applied economics at Aix-Marseille University.

Bramoullé was a member of the Association pour la liberté économique et le progrès social (ALEPS) and the Nouveaux économistes with liberal views. He was responsible for the budget and finances of the mayor of Aix-en-Provence from 1983 to 1989.

== Biography ==
Born in Aix-en-Provence on 17 December 1944, Bramoullé graduated from the Sciences Po in 1968 and earned a doctorate in economics from Paris-Sorbonne University in 1972.

After working for the French National Centre for Scientific Research, Bramoullé taught economics and finances at Paris-Sorbonne University, Paris Dauphine University, and the University of Picardy Jules Verne. He then joined Aix-Marseille University in 1973, teaching there until 2012. From 1976 to 1979, he was dean of applied economics at the university. He specialized in topics of social justice and economic methodology and epistemology. He followed the Austrian school of economics and was a member of the Mont Pelerin Society.

In 1991, Bramoullé published a 220-page pamphlet in which he denied that climate change and the hole in the ozone layer was caused by mankind. He was highly critical of Michel Serres and the green movement, which he believed extorted "irrational" fears of the public. He directed the Provençal circle of the Club de l'Horloge before being replaced by Jean-Louis Garello.

Bramoullé was committed to the public affairs of Aix-en-Provence, advocating for fiscal moderation, fighting public waste, and local autonomy. He served on the municipal council from 2014 to 2020 and served as interim mayor following Maryse Joissains's resignation for health reasons.

Gérard Bramoullé died on 1 December 2023, at the age of 78.

== Works ==
- Analyse du déséquilibre (1981)
- La Peste Verte (1991)
- La Monnaie
- Économie politique : la monnaie, la répartition, les échanges internationaux
- Économie monétaire (1998)
- Finances et Libertés locales, pourquoi l'explosion des impôts locaux ? (2006)
- 50 ans d'urbanisme en Pays d'Aix (2011)
- Metropolis, Le scénario de la Métropole Aix-Marseille 2017 (2017)
