= Erik Meyn =

Norwegian journalist (1955–2023)

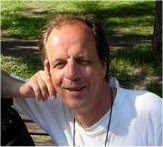
Meyn in 2006

Erik Halfdan Meyn (3 July 1955 – 31 December 2023) was a Norwegian journalist, television host and director. He worked in Norwegian Broadcasting Corporation in Norway. In 1996, Meyn was one of the first to attempt to use the Internet as a source of entertainment (rather infotainment) in the live television show "Spider" or "NRK2 Spider".

== Biography ==
Erik Meyn was probably the first contemporary Norwegian television personality who understood the new possibilities of the World Wide Web. Meyn tried to explain this to a television audience through the TV series "Spider" - and was met with skepticism.

Today, NRK (the Norwegian state, public television channel), use internet to broadcast television. Meyn composed music in his own band.

Meyn's television series about internet was flawed by the fact that he only had a download ratio of a few Kb pr second - and his efforts to explain internet was lost to the general public. However, Meyn was also known as a truly original television character. The show aired on Norwegian Broadcasting Corporation's channel NRK2 from September to December 1996.

The "NRK2 Spider" (first season) was presented at the TV-festival INPUT in Nantes, France, in 1997. In January 2011 the Norwegian Broadcasting Corporation republished all the 16 episodes of "NRK2 Spider" on their Internet video service called "NRK Nett-TV" in Norwegian.

Meyn died on 31 December 2023, at the age of 68.
