= Zdzisław Antolski =

Polish poet (1953–2023)

Zdzisław Antolski (16 January 1953 – 4 December 2023) was a Polish poet. Antolski was born in Skalbmierz on 16 January 1953, and died on 4 December 2023, at the age of 70.

== Publications ==
- Samosąd (1978)
- Sam w tłumie (1980)
- Do snu przebieram sobowtóra (1981)
- Okolica Józefa (1985)
- Sejsmograf (1990)
- Józefy (1993)
- Walka Stulecia (1993)
- Moje Ponidzie. Historia intymna. (1994)
- Ściąga z miłości (Zapiski z okresu dojrzewania) [opowiadania] (1995)
- Maszyna metafizyczna (2012)
- Furtka w czasie (2013)
- Moje Kielce literackie (2016), zbiór wspomnień i esejów
- Ojczyzna papierowych żołnierzyków (2016)
- Dzidziuś (2017)
- fejsbyczki czyli posty i aforyzmy (Kielce 2018)
- Ostatni podryw (Kielce 2020), zbiór opowiadań
- Kapsuła Czasu (Warszawa 2021)
