= Susan K. Sell =

Political Science Professor

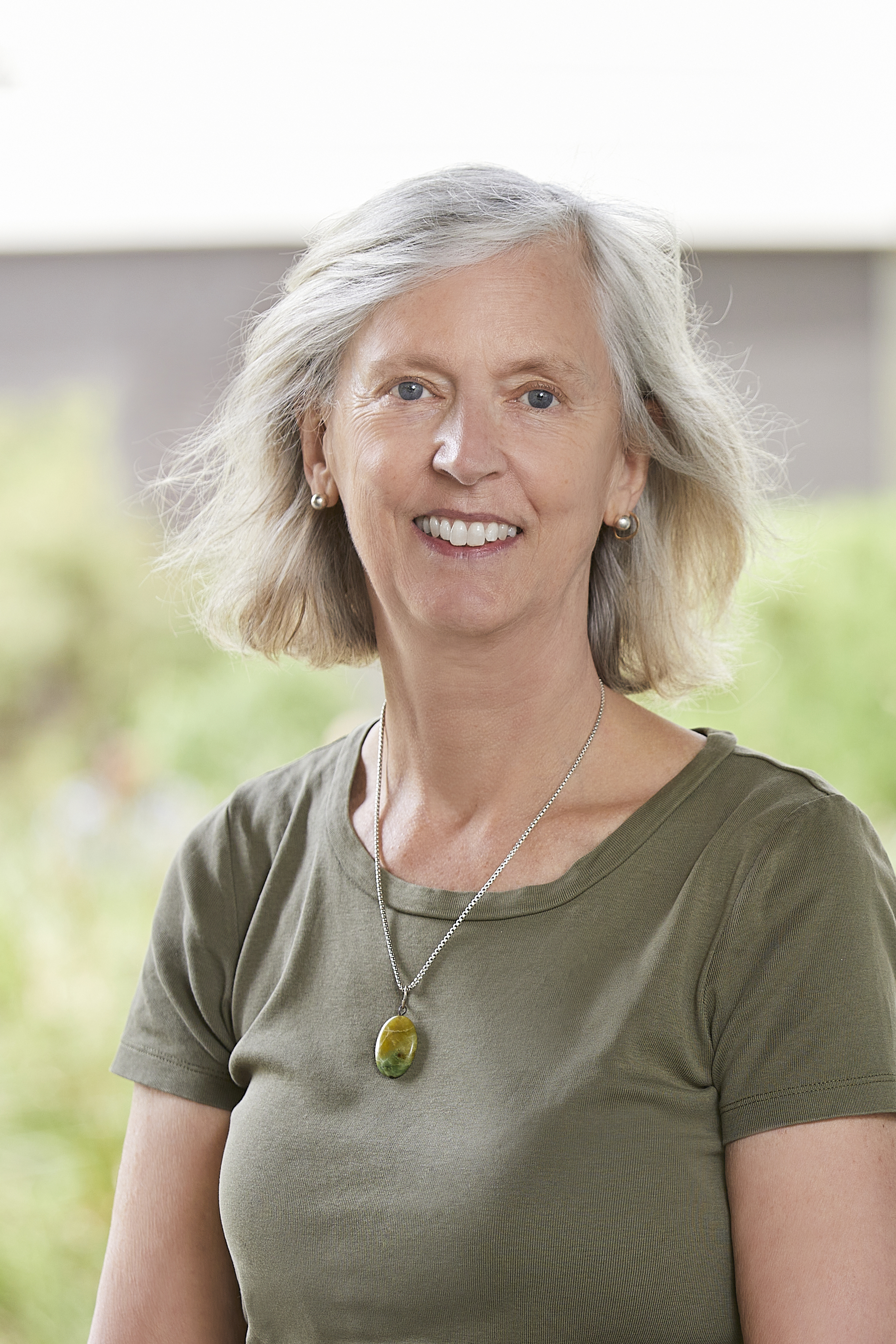
Professor Susan K. Sell

Susan K. Sell (22 November 1957 – 25 December 2023) was an American scholar in the field of international political economy. She was a Professor at the Australian National University and at George Washington University. Her research focused on intellectual property, trade and investment, with a focus on the power structures shaping them.

== Education and Career ==
Sell earned her PhD in political science from the University of California, Berkeley. While at George Washington University, she was the director of the Institute for Global and International Studies at the Elliott School of International Affairs. In 2016, Sell joined the School of Regulation and Global Governance (RegNet, formerly the Regulatory Institutions Network) at the Australian National University.

During her career, Sell served on the board of Geneva-based IP-Watch and on the Expert Advisory Group for the United Nations Secretary General's High-level Panel on Access to Medicines from 2015 to 2016. She was also on the editorial boards of the Review of International Political Economy, European Journal of International Relations, Global Governance, and International Studies Quarterly.

== Books ==
- Power and Ideas: North-South Politics of Intellectual Property and Antitrust
- Intellectual Property Rights: A Critical History (written with Christopher May)
- Who Governs the Globe? (co-edited with Deborah D. Avant and Martha Finnemore)
- Private Power and Public Law: The Globalization of Intellectual Property Rights
- The Global Battle Over Intellectual Property: The Cat-and-Mouse Game of Protection and Enforcement
