= Lynne Zylstra =

New Zealand artist

Lynne Frances Zylstra (née Wheeler; 1945 - 23 December 2023) was a New Zealand artist. Her work is held in the permanent collection of Christchurch Art Gallery.

== Biography ==
Zylstra studied at Ilam School of Fine Arts at the University of Canterbury in Christchurch, graduating in 1965. She then studied at Auckland Teachers' College and taught art in Christchurch, Auckland and Dunedin. She exhibited with the Canterbury Society of Arts in 1972, 1973, 1974 and 1975. In 1975 her work was selected for an exhibition at Christchurch's sister city, Kurashiki, in Japan. In 1976 she exhibited at Otago Art Gallery.
