= Roger E. Kirk =

American psychologist (1930–2023)

Roger E. Kirk (February 23, 1930 – December 30, 2023) was a professor of psychology and statistics at Baylor University. He earned his B.A., M.A., and Ph.D. from Ohio State University. Before joining the faculty of Psychology and Neuroscience at Baylor University he was the Senior Psychoacoustical Engineer at the Baldwin Piano and Organ Company in Cincinnati, Ohio. Professor Kirk was a fellow of the American Psychological Association, the American Psychological Society, and the American Educational Research Association. He was a Baylor University Master Teacher, "the highest honor granted to Baylor faculty members for sustained excellence in teaching at Baylor University."

Kirk wrote five books. His first book, Experimental Design: Procedures for the Behavioral Sciences, now in a fourth edition, was designated a Citation Classic by the Institute for Scientific Information. His introductory statistics book is in a fifth edition. Kirk and his wife were avid ballroom dancers and he frequently used the stairs to get to his 3rd story office.
