= Zita Carno =

American pianist (1935–2023)

Zita Carno (April 15, 1935 – December 7, 2023) was an American pianist. She was the pianist of the Los Angeles Philharmonic for 25 years. Carno died in Tampa, Florida on December 7, 2023, at the age of 88.
