= Roger Vowles =

English cricketer

Personal information
- Full name: Roger Charles Vowles
- Born: 5 April 1932; Grimsby, Lincolnshire, England
- Died: 29 December 2023 (aged 91)
- Batting: Right-handed
- Bowling: Right-arm medium

Domestic team information
- Years: Team
- 1957–1961: Nottinghamshire

Career statistics
Competition	First-class
Matches	16
Runs scored	292
Batting average	11.68
100s/50s	–/1
Top score	54
Balls bowled	1,698
Wickets	23
Bowling average	40.00
5 wickets in innings	–
10 wickets in match	–
Best bowling	4/106
Catches/stumpings	7/–
- Source: Cricinfo, 19 May 2012

Roger Charles Vowles (5 April 1932 – 29 December 2023) was an English cricketer. Vowles was a right-handed batsman who bowled right-arm medium pace. He was born at Grimsby, Lincolnshire.

Vowles made his first-class debut for Nottinghamshire against Derbyshire in the 1957 County Championship. He made fifteen further first-class appearances for the county, the last of which came against Yorkshire. In his sixteen first-class appearances for the county, he scored 292 runs at an average of 11.68, with a high score of 54. This score was his only first-class half century and came on debut against Derbyshire. With the ball, he took 23 wickets at a bowling average of 40.00, with best figures of 4/106.
