= List of philanthropists =

Overview of notable philanthropists

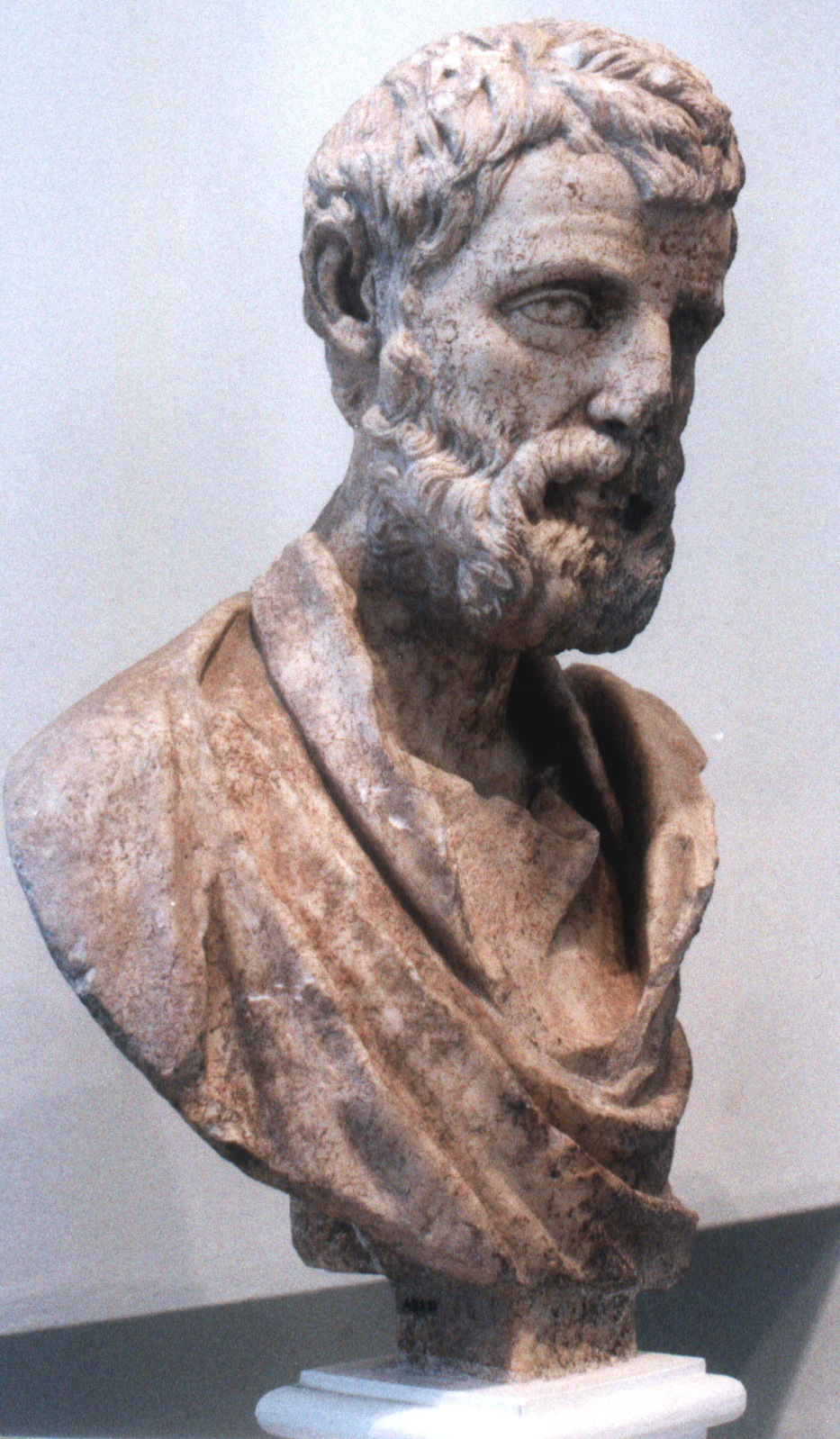
Herodes Atticus, a Greek philanthropist of Classical Rome active during the second century (antiquity)

A philanthropist is someone who engages in philanthropy; donating their time, money, and/or reputation to charitable causes. The term may apply to any volunteer or to anyone who makes a donation, but the label is most often applied to those who donate large sums of money or who make a major impact through their volunteering, such as a trustee who manages a philanthropic organization or one who establishes and funds a foundation.

A philanthropist may not always find universal approval for their deeds. Common accusations include supporting an unworthy cause (such as funding art instead of fighting world hunger) or having selfish motivation at heart (such as avoiding taxes or attaining personal fame). A philanthropist is also someone who cares for someone else's needs instead of their own.

== Notable philanthropists ==
=== A ===
- Abdul Rahman Al-Sumait – founder of Direct Aid, a charity organization.
- Abdul Sattar Edhi – co-head of the Edhi Foundation in Pakistan.
- Achyuta Samanta – founder of the Kalinga Institute of Social Sciences (KISS).
- Adar Poonawalla – In 2016, he was listed by GQ Magazine and awarded Philanthropist of the year.
- Ailsa Mellon-Bruce – co-founder of the Andrew W. Mellon Foundation.
- Alice and Sheryl Cooper – co-founded Alice Cooper's Solid Rock Foundation, a non-profit supporting teenagers.
- Alisher Usmanov – business-magnate, philanthropist, FIE President, founder of Art, science and sport foundation.
- Alagappa Chettiar – notable for work on Indian education.
- Anne-Françoise de Fougeret (1745-1813) – French philanthropist.
- Alfred Nobel – founder of the Nobel Prizes.
- Alice Barbee Castleman – American social leader, philanthropist, and suffragist from Kentucky.
- Alicia Keys – American singer/songwriter; spokeswoman for Keep A Child Alive.
- Amal Hijazi – Lebanese singer, known for her philanthropy.
- Amjad Saqib – Pakistani social entrepreneur, development practitioner, as well as, founder and Executive Director of Akhuwat Foundation
- Andrew Carnegie – founder of the Carnegie Corporation of New York, Carnegie Endowment for International Peace, Carnegie Foundation for the Advancement of Teaching, Carnegie Institution for Science, Carnegie Trust for the Universities of Scotland, Carnegie Hero Fund, Carnegie United Kingdom Trust, Carnegie Council for Ethics in International Affairs, Carnegie Mellon University, and the Carnegie Museums of Pittsburgh. He also donated money to build over 2500 public libraries worldwide, the Carnegie Hall in New York, and the Peace Palace at The Hague
- Angelina Jolie – American actress; known for her humanitarian work worldwide; a Goodwill Ambassador for the UN Refugee Agency
- Annie Rensselaer Tinker – volunteer nurse in WWI and suffragist, formed the Annie R. Tinker Memorial Fund nonprofit organization
- Ansar Burney – Pakistani human and civil rights activist and chairman of Ansar Burney Trust International
- Anthony Ashley Cooper, 7th Earl of Shaftesbury – chairman of the Ragged Schools Union (during the Victorian era)
- Anthony J. Drexel – founder of Drexel University
- Arpad Busson – founder of Ark (Absolute Return for Kids) Academy
- Audrey Geisel – Dr. Seuss's widow. President of Dr. Seuss Fund which supports a variety of causes in San Diego, including University of California, San Diego
- Azim Premji – founder of Azim Premji Foundation, donated $21 billion towards education

=== B ===
- Belinda Stronach – co-founder of Spread the Net
- Ben Delo – took The Giving Pledge
- Bill Ackman – in 2011, the Ackmans were among The Chronicle of Philanthropy's "Philanthropy 50" list of the most generous donors
- Bill Gates – co-founder of the Bill & Melinda Gates Foundation
- Bilquis Edhi – co-head of the Edhi Foundation in Pakistan
- Bono – one of the world's best-known philanthropic performers; named the most politically effective celebrity of all time by the National Journal

=== C ===
- Adelaide Cabete – feminist, humanitarian, physician, founder of the Conselho Nacional das Mulheres Portuguesas
- Calouste Gulbenkian – founder of the Calouste Gulbenkian Foundation dedicated to the promotion of the arts, science, and education
- Cari Tuna – co-founder Good Ventures
- Carlos Slim Helu – telecom tycoon, founder of the Carlos Slim Foundation
- Catherine T. MacArthur – co-founder of the MacArthur Foundation
- Charles Garland – gave up most of his family inheritance in 1922 in order to establish the Garland Fund to promote radical charitable causes
- Charles Pratt – founder of Pratt Institute
- Charles Simonyi – founder of Charles and Lisa Simonyi Fund for Arts and Sciences, $100 million
- Chris Hohn – founder of The Children's Investment Fund Foundation
- Chris Martin – singer of rock band Coldplay; known for supporting the Make Trade Fair campaign; he and his band contribute 15% of their money to charity
- Christopher Reeve – founder of the Christopher and Dana Reeve Foundation
- Chuck Feeney – founder of Atlantic Philanthropies
- Cornelius Vanderbilt – founder of the Vanderbilt University
- Cristiano Ronaldo – professional football player
- Chris Meek - founder of SoldierStrong

=== D ===
- Dame Shirley Porter – Tesco heiress; co-founder of The Porter Foundation; has donated to Tel Aviv University, social welfare facilities and ecological funding, the National Portrait Gallery in London
- Danai Gurira - UN Women Goodwill Ambassador; co-founder of the non-profit Almasi Arts Alliance and founder of the non-profit Love Our Girls
- David Bohnett – founder of the David Bohnett Foundation supporting a wide range of social issues including LGBT rights
- David Gilmour – singer and guitarist of Pink Floyd; was made CBE for his years of philanthropy; amongst other things, Gilmour gave $21.5 million from the auctioning of his guitars to climate change charity ClientEarth and $7.5 million from sale of his London home to the homeless charity Crisis
- David Koch – founder of the David H. Koch Charitable Foundation; listed by The Chronicle of Philanthropy as one of the world's top 50 philanthropists in 2013
- David Rubenstein - co-founder of The Carlyle Group; he has donated more than $700 million to educational, historical, and other causes
- Demi Lovato – provides the Lovato Treatment Scholarship; supporter of 13 different charity organization; an official Ambassador for the youth empowerment event We Day and the organization Free the Children
- Đorđe Vajfert – patron of humanitarian and cultural institutions and donor to the University of Belgrade
- Dolly Parton – country singer; advocate for children's education through her foundation, the Imagination Library, which gives books to children to develop their reading skills before starting school.
- Don Ball – co-founder of Ballhomes, founder of Hope Center
- Donald Rix – BC Innovation Council, BC Cancer Agency Foundation, BC Medical Services Foundation, and the BC Children’s Hospital Foundation
- Dr. Mo Ibrahim – founder of telecom company Celtel International; set up the Mo Ibrahim Foundation and initiated the Mo Ibrahim Prize for Achievement in African Leadership
- Dustin Moskovitz – co-founder Good Ventures

=== E ===
- Edward Harkness – various private colleges and boarding schools; medical facilities; Commonwealth Fund
- Elinor Sauerwein – Salvation Army philanthropist
- Elisabeth Mills Reid – American philanthropist and volunteer for the American Red Cross
- Ellen Gates Starr – founder of the biomedical institute that bears his name Hull House
- Elton John – has raised more than US$125 million just for the Elton John AIDS Foundation. In 2004 he donated over US$43 million to organizations around the world, making him the most generous person in music for that year, "a title he retains year after year." In 1997 he raised US$40 million for charity through sales of the single "Candle in the Wind 1997". He currently supports at least 57 charities.
- Enriqueta Augustina Rylands – founder of the John Rylands Library
- Eric Schmidt and Wendy Schmidt – The Schmidt Family Foundation, Schmidt Ocean Institute and Schmidt Futures

=== F ===
- Faceless Angel of Jeonju – an unidentified philanthropist in Jeonju, South Korea
- Fanny Peabody Mason – heiress, philanthropist to music and arts in Boston
- Fazle Hasan Abed – founder of BRAC
- Frank F Islam – information technology entrepreneur, working to improve education system. $2 million invested in Aligarh Muslim University for a separate business school.

=== G ===
- Gary K. Michelson - founder of Michaelson Philanthropies
- Gary Sinise – co-founder of Operation Iraqi Children
- Gautam Adani – Adani is the owner of the Adani Foundation, funded through the Adani Group. It was founded in 1996. Other than Gujarat, the organisation operates in the states of Maharashtra, Rajasthan, Himachal Pradesh, Madhya Pradesh, Chhattisgarh, and Odisha..
- George Clooney – known for humanitarian work in aiding the Darfur conflict, organizing Hope for Haiti Now, and involvement in Not On Our Watch
- George Peabody – founder of numerous charitable institutions in the United States and United Kingdom
- George Soros – estimated to have donated more than US$32 billion, often through the Open Society Institute and Soros Foundations
- Godwin Maduka – doctor and founder of Las Vegas Pain Institute and Medical Center
- Gerry Lenfest – donated $5 million in coherence with Chester County to preserve over 1,000 acres (4.0 km^{2}) of land in Newlin Township, Chester County, Pennsylvania; the land is now owned by Natural Lands

=== H ===
- Hansjörg Wyss – businessman, founder of a medical research and design company Synthes and the Wyss Foundation
- Harold Osher – American map collector and namesake of the Osher Map Library
- Harriet Converse Moody – American businesswoman and arts patron
- Helen Phillips Levin – American social worker and disability rights activist, supported grantmaking through her family's Jay and Rose Philips Family Foundation
- Henry Ford – co-founder of the Ford Foundation
- Henry W. Bloch – founder of H&R Block Tax company. Henry established the nationally acclaimed Marion Bloch Neuroscience Institute, formed the Marion and Henry Bloch Family Foundation.
- Hidiya Hanim Barakat – Egyptian philanthropist, helped establish twelve hospitals in Egypt by 1961.
- Hilmar Reksten – Norwegian shipping magnate, tax evader, patron of the arts
- Holden Karnofsky – co-founder and board member of the charity evaluator GiveWell and the executive director of the Open Philanthropy Project
- Howard Ahmanson Jr. – multi-millionaire philanthropist and financier of the causes of many conservative Christian cultural, religious and political organizations
- Howard Hughes – aviator, engineer, industrialist and film producer; donated US$1.56 billion to various charities including the Howard Hughes Medical Institute

=== I ===
- Iain Percy – co-founder of the Andrew Simpson Sailing Foundation which was set up after the death of his best friend Andrew Simpson to facilitate children's access to sailing
- Imran Khan – founder of the Shaukat Khanum Memorial Trust, which was behind the first cancer research institution in Pakistan
- Irwin M. Jacobs – contributed hundreds of millions of dollars to the field of education through donations and grants to schools and organizations
- Isaac Wolfson – managing director of Great Universal Stores
- Ivana Zorman – Slovenian founder and headmistress of an orphanages and a humanitarian worker

=== J ===
- J. Paul Getty – funded the construction of the Getty Villa, the original Getty Museum, and donated his art collection to it; upon his death, left his fortune to the Getty Museum, which eventually expanded to the Getty Center in Los Angeles
- J. K. Rowling – British author, founder of the Volant Trust, which works to address social deprivation in at-risk women, children and youth, co-founder of the charity Lumos which works to end the institutionalisation of children worldwide, founded a research centre for multiple sclerosis at the University of Edinburgh, founder of Beira's Place, a support centre in Edinburgh for female survivors of sexual assault, President of One Parent Families;
- James E. Stowers – founder of the Stowers Institute for Medical Research
- James Packer – jointly with his majority-owned company Crown Resorts pledged $200 million over 10 years to support Australian community groups
- Jamie and Karen Phelps Moyer – founded the Moyer Foundation to assist non-profit organizations in raising money for children with serious distress
- Jamsetji Tata – founded Tata Group
- Jane Addams – co-founder of the Hull House settlement house in Chicago
- Janet Lacey – English charity director of Christian Aid
- Jeff Bezos – founder of Amazon.com who help homeless and charity like Fred Hutchinson Cancer Research Foundation.
- Jimmy Donaldson ("MrBeast") – YouTuber and founder of Beast Philanthropy, a YouTube channel known for its charitable videos. Also collaborated in two fundraising challenge events known as Team Trees and Team Seas which aimed to raise $20 million and $30 million USD in return of planting 20 million trees and removing 30 million pounds of trash respectively.
- Joe Blackman – dedicated much of his youth to helping young people start their own businesses
- John Cena – wrestler, actor, television personality, philanthropist under Make-A-Wish Foundation
- John D. MacArthur – co-founder of the MacArthur Foundation
- John D. Rockefeller – founder of the University of Chicago, Rockefeller University, Central Philippine University, General Education Board, and Rockefeller Foundation
- John D. Rockefeller III – major third-generation Rockefeller philanthropist; founder of the Asia Society (1956), the Population Council (1952) and a reconstituted Japan Society; chairman of the Rockefeller Foundation for 20 years; established the Rockefeller Public Service Awards in 1958
- John D. Rockefeller Jr. – expanded the Rockefeller Foundation and Rockefeller University; bought and then donated the land in Manhattan upon which the Headquarters of the United Nations was built
- John Harvard – one of the founders of Harvard College
- John Peele Clapham (1801–1875) – founder of Salem Chapel, Burley in Wharfedale, a founder of West Park United Reformed Church, Harrogate, founder of various Sunday schools, editor of hymn book.
- John R. Hunting – major contributor to liberal or progressive 527 organizations
- John Studzinski – champion of the homeless and the arts in the UK; founder and owner of the Genesis Foundation
- Johns Hopkins – founder of the Johns Hopkins University and the Johns Hopkins Hospital
- John Smith – British banker who paid for the building of St Matthias' Church, Burley and other causes.
- José Mujica – Uruguayan politician that donated 90% of his salary to poor people and small entrepreneurs.
- Joseph Rowntree – founder of the four Rowntree trusts
- Joseph Vijay Chandrasekhar — Indian actor, singer and dancer known for his humanitarianism
- Josh Harris – American investor and sports team owner, founder of Harris Philanthropies
- Juana Ross Edwards (1830-1913) – Chilean philanthropist
- Juliette Gordon Low – founder of the Girl Scouts of the USA
- Julius Curtis Lewis Jr. – made an estimated lifetime donations of US$130 million to various civic, spiritual; charitable organizations, many in Savannah, Georgia
- Julius Rosenwald – part-owner and leader of Sears, Roebuck, constructed over 5,000 schools for African American students during the Jim Crow era, and established the Rosenwald Fund, which donated millions of dollars in funds to African American causes

=== K ===
- Kenneth C. Griffin – founder and CEO of Citadel LLC; co-founder of the Kenneth and Anne Griffin Foundation
- Kumar Mangalam Birla – As per the EdelGive Hurun India Philanthropy List 2021, Kumar Mangalam Birla and his family ranked fourth on the philanthropy list with donations mostly to the healthcare sector.

=== L ===
- Lady Gaga – singer-songwriter, founder of Born This Way Foundation
- Larry Ellison – pledged to give more than half the value of his stock in Oracle Corporation to the Bill and Melinda Gates Foundation
- Emma C. Laugenour - co-founder and principal benefactor of the Home Alliance
- LeBron James – The founder of the LeBron James Family Foundation. The foundation helps children and single-parent families, especially in his hometown of Akron, Ohio.
- Levi Strauss – gave to many notable foundations of his time; gave to many Jewish synagogues and organizations
- Libbie Beach Brown – children's homes and orphanages
- Lionel Messi – Professional soccer player
- Li Ka-shing – founder and chairman of the Li Ka Shing Foundation, which focuses on capacity empowerment through education and building of a caring society through medical and healthcare related projects; in 2006, pledged to donate one-third of his fortune estimated at over US$10 billion to philanthropic projects
- Linus Pauling – donated time and effort and spent personal funds to bring about the worldwide ban on above-ground nuclear weapons testing
- Lucia Hou – awarded the 2018 Woman of Year internationally by World Class Beauty Queen for her philanthropy work around the world
- Lucy Salisbury Doolittle – American philanthropist
- Luka Ćelović – benefactor of Serbian education

=== M ===
- Madonna – founder of Ray of Light Foundation (1998), and Raising Malawi (2006), she has donated to and advocated for numerous organizations and causes
- MacKenzie Scott - Ex wife of Jeff Bezos, donated more than 25 billion dollars
- Mahesh Babu – actor, humanitarian and philanthropist; he runs a charitable trust and non-profit organisation, Heal-a-Child. He is also associated with Rainbow Hospitals as their goodwill ambassador.
- Marc Benioff – created the 1-1-1 model of integrated corporate philanthropy, by which companies contribute 1 percent of equity, 1 percent of employee hours, and 1 percent of product back to the community
- Marian Tompson – co-founder of La Leche League International, a breastfeeding support organization
- Mariah Carey – Police Athletic League of New York City, Obstetrics, NewYork-Presbyterian Hospital, World Food Programme, LGBT community, America: A Tribute to Heroes, Kosovo, Live 8 concert, London, Hurricane Katrina, Just Stand Up!, Stand Up to Cancer, The Fresh Air Fund, and China Covid-19
- Marion G. Wells – president of the Marion G. Wells Foundation, board member; The Heritage Foundation, Cleveland Clinic Florida, and Exuma Cays Land and Sea Park
- Mark Zuckerberg – co-founder of social media network Facebook
- Marija Trandafil – benefactor of education, medicine and welfare in Novi Sad
- Marion Wiesel – established the Elie Wiesel Foundation for Humanity and Executive Director and Chairpersonof the Beit Tzipora Centers
- Mary Fels (1863-1953) – founder of Joseph Fels International Commission
- Mary Lee Ware – principal sponsor of the Harvard Museum of Natural History's famous Glass Flowers exhibit; a key player in the creation of the New Hampshire Rhododendron State Park
- Mary Louise Milliken Childs – builder of the Milliken Memorial Community House, the first privately donated community house in America
- Melinda Gates – co-founder of the Bill & Melinda Gates Foundation
- Metallica – All Within My Hands Foundation. They also donate a portion of ticket sales in every city visited a local charity (predominantly food banks)
- Michael Bloomberg – donations include over US$1.1 billion to Johns Hopkins University
- Michael Dell – established the Michael and Susan Dell Foundation, which focuses on grants, urban education, childhood health, and family economic stability
- Michael Jackson – donated more than US$500 million to various foundations and won numerous awards for his humanitarianism; founded the Heal the World Foundation
- Michelle Dilhara – Sri Lankan actress
- Milton Hershey – founder of West Heath School
- Mir Osman Ali Khan – 7th Nizam of Hyderabad who donated 5000kgs of Gold to India and many donations to Temples, churches and other educations institutions.
- Miša Anastasijević – philanthropist of the 19th century Serbia
- Mohammed bin Rashid Al Maktoum – founder of the Mohammed bin Rashid Global Initiatives, a grouping of some 33 charities, awards and philanthropic entities.
- Mr. T – actor; motivational speaker; donated all his gold to charity

=== N ===
- Nikola Spasić – Serbian philanthropist.
- Nina J. Cullinan – American philanthropist in Houston
- Nile Rodgers - Co-founder of We Are Family Foundation, a non-profit that funds and mentors young leaders
- Nita Ambani – Reliance Foundation is an Indian philanthropic initiative founded in 2010 by Nita Ambani. Reliance Industries is a patron of the organization.
- Nicholas M. Butler – president of the Carnegie Endowment for International Peace, 1925-1945

=== O ===
- Oprah Winfrey – estimated donations above US$300 million, and founder of Oprah's Angel Network

=== P ===
- P. K. Subban – Canadian ice hockey player; donated $10 million to the Montreal Children's Hospital
- Paul Mellon – major benefactor of arts and education; co-founder of the Andrew W. Mellon Foundation
- Paul Newman – founder of Newman's Own and the Hole in the Wall Gang Camp for seriously ill children; major donations to other charities
- Paul Walker – founder of the charity Reach Out Worldwide
- Peter Cooper – set up a free college in New York City to help poor people ambitious to improve themselves; Thomas Edison was an early alum
- Petra Němcová – Czech supermodel; founder of the Happy Hearts Fund
- Phil Knight – co-founder of Nike, Inc.; supporter of Oregon Health & Science University, Stanford University and the University of Oregon
- Preston A. Wells Jr. – businessman; sponsor of the University of Florida's Neurology department
- Prince Al-Waleed bin Talal – chairman of investment firm Kingdom Holding Company; pledged US$32bn donation to his philanthropy organization Alwaleed Philanthropies
- Prince Rahim Aga Khan V – chairman of the Aga Khan Development Network
- Princess Bernice Pauahi – left properties to the education of Hawaiian boys and girls in what is now Kamehameha Schools

=== R ===
- Ramzan Chhipa – Pakistani philanthropist and social worker and Chairman of Chhipa Welfare Association based in Karachi, Pakistan
- Ratan Tata – founder of Sir Ratan Tata Trust and chairman of Tata Trust
- Raymond and Ruth Perelman – parents of Ronald O. Perelman; in 2011 donated $225 million to the University of Pennsylvania Medical School, the largest donation in that university's history
- Richard Desmond – President of the Norwood Charity; raised around £14m for charitable causes with the RD Crusaders; helped build the Richard Desmond Children's Eye Centre part of Moorfields Eye Hospital
- Richard Ellis (mayor) – self-made man and property developer, who gifted his town its Jubilee Memorial and paid for other town needs.
- Rizwan Hussain – barrister, television presenter, international humanitarian worker; former Hindi music singer and producer; known for presenting Islamic and charity shows on Channel S and Islam Channel
- Robert Bass – large donations with wife Ann to Yale University, including the building of the Bass Library at Yale, and numerous other groups including the Brookings Institution, Duke University and Stanford University where Mr. Bass is on the board of trustees.
- Rohini Nilekani – Nilekani is also a philanthropist and pledged ₹50 crores to Ashoka Trust for Research in Ecology and the Environment (ATREE).
- Ronald O. Perelman – largest Revlon stockholder; has donated over $200 million to various causes since 2001, including a $50 million gift to create the Ronald O. Perelman Heart Institute at New York-Presbyterian Hospital and Weill Cornell Medical Center
- Ruth Pfau – head of the Marie Adelaide Leprosy Centre in Pakistan; as a result of her efforts, the World Health Organization declared leprosy a controlled disease in Pakistan in 1996

=== S ===
- Sainsbury family – founders of Sainsbury's, the UK's large supermarket chain and the Sainsbury Family Charitable Trusts
- Samuel Morley MP – founded Morley College, London; endowed other institutions and causes
- Sava Tekelija – benefactor of scientific education
- Sean Parker – donated $600 million to launch the Parker Foundation
- Sean Fieler – hedge fund manager and conservative donor
- Shah Rukh Khan – only Indian to receive UNESCO Pyramide con Marni award for his charity work in 2011
- Shakira – founder of Pies Descalzos Foundation
- Sheema Kermani – Pakistani social activist (Culture, Women's rights, Peace), the founder of Tehrik-e-Niswan Cultural Action Group (Women's Movement)
- Shiv Nadar – Shiv Nadar has committed more than $1 billion to philanthropy.
- Sidney Myer – founder of the Australian Department store chain Myer
- Sir Charles Henry de Soysa – Ceylonese entrepreneur who pioneered a multitude of medical, educational, religious and infrastructure projects
- Steve Shirley – IT entrepreneur, autism venture philanthropist, founding funder Oxford Internet Institute, UK National Ambassador for Philanthropy 2009/10
- Sir Cliff Richard – one of the vice-presidents of Tearfund, a British religious, relief and development agency;
- Sir David Robinson – founder of the Robinson Charitable Trust and Robinson College
- Sir Ganesh Dutt – longest-serving minister in British Empire who gave all his earnings to charitable works, especially education
- Sir Run Run Shaw – founder of the Shaw Prize Foundation
- Stephan Schmidheiny – investor, philanthropist and advocate of sustainable development, founder of non-profits Viva Trust and Fundación Avina
- Steve Wozniak – provided the money, and some technical support, for technology program for the Los Gatos School district; co-founder of Apple Computer (now Apple Inc.)
- Sudha Murthy – Murty's Infosys Foundation is a public charitable trust founded in 1996
- Sunil Bharti Mittal – set up Bharti Foundation which runs schools for 30,000 underprivileged children in rural India
- Suriya – Suriya and his family support the Sivakumar Charitable Trust

=== T ===
- Tarek Ben Halim – investment banker and founder of Alfanar in 2004, the first Venture philanthropy organization with a special focus on the Arab world
- Thomas Holloway – Victorian patent medicine entrepreneur and founder of Royal Holloway, University of London
- Ty Pennington – host of ABC's Extreme Makeover: Home Edition; advocate of doing good towards others in need and to those who give of themselves for the sake of others

=== U ===
- Usher Raymond – singer-songwriter; founding Chairman of the New Look Foundation

=== V ===
- Vernon Hill – founder of Commerce Bank and President of Metro Bank; donated $10m to the Penns School of Veterinary Medicine
- Vijay Eswaran – founder of RYTHM foundation and Q NET
- Virginia Weiffenbach Kettering – Dayton, Ohio's leading philanthropist and patron of the arts
- Vitalik Buterin – co-founder of Ethereum. On 12 May 2021, he donated $1 billion worth of the cryptocurrencies Shiba Inu and Ether to a COVID-19 relief fund in India.

=== W ===
- Wallace Rasmussen – American philanthropist and proponent of higher education
- William Kamkwamba - Malawian inventor, author, and philanthropist. Known for primarily in 2001 when he built a wind turbine to power multiple electrical appliances in his poor family's house. Co-founder of the Moving Windmills Project Providing tons of Malawians with sustainable innovations and renewable energy sources.
- Warren Buffett – pledged US$30.7 billion worth of Berkshire Hathaway stock to the Bill and Melinda Gates Foundation
- Werner Reinhart – industrialist, philanthropist, music and literature patron
- Weston family – founders of Loblaw food and drug retailer, a real estate investment trust Choice, Weston Foods and Weston Family Foundation
- William Allen – founded and endowed many institutions and causes including 'Schools of Industry' at Lindfield and Newington Academy for Girls
- William Gott – British industrialist and benefactor to churches, museums and civic buildings
- William Henry Vanderbilt – co-founder of the Metropolitan Opera
- William Morris, 1st Viscount Nuffield – donor of 1,700 Both respirators to hospitals, founder of the Nuffield Foundation and Nuffield College, Oxford
- William Wilberforce – English politician; headed successful parliamentary campaign against the British slave trade; later supported the campaign for complete abolition

=== Y ===
- Yusuf Islam (also known as Cat Stevens) – founder of Islamic schools, Muslim Aid and Small Kindness
- Yuzuru Hanyu – Japanese figure skater; Tsunami Disaster Prevention Ambassador, appointed by Japan's Cabinet Office in 2014, Japanese Red Cross spokesperson for reconstruction efforts after the 2011 Tōhoku earthquake and tsunami, and chairperson of the annual 3.11 commemoration ice show titled Yuzuru Hanyu Notte Stellata, having continuously donated for reconstruction and disaster prevention since 2011.

=== Z ===
- Zerbanoo Gifford – founder of the ASHA Foundation. President of the World Zoroastrian Organisation.

== Greatest philanthropists by amount of USD ==
The following table orders the greatest philanthropists by the estimated amount given to charity, corresponding to USD.

Name	Amount given	Cause
Jamsetji Tata	$102.4 billion	Education, healthcare
Bill Gates	$79 billion	Healthcare, extreme poverty, education, access to information technology
Warren Buffett	$32.1 billion	Healthcare, education, AIDS-prevention, sanitation
George Soros	$32 billion	Healthcare, anti-fascist publications, human rights, economic, legal, and social reform
Azim Premji	$21 billion	Education, healthcare
MacKenzie Scott	$14 billion	Racial equality, LGBTQ+ equality, functional democracy, and climate change
Michael Bloomberg	$21.1 billion	Environment, public health, arts, government innovation and education
Li Ka-shing	$10.7 billion	Education, healthcare
Andrew Carnegie	$9.5 billion	Libraries, education, peace
Alisher Usmanov	$7.3 billion	Art, science, sport, healthcare
Chuck Feeney	$6.8 billion	Healthcare, youth, aging, poverty, human rights
The Sainsbury family	$5 billion	Art, education, human rights, youth, aging
Christopher Hohn	$4.5 billion	Youth, poverty, education
Carlos Slim Helu	$4.2 billion	Arts, education, healthcare, sports, downtown restoration
Alwaleed Philanthropies	$4 billion	Alwaleed Philanthropies collaborates with a range of philanthropic, government and educational organizations to combat poverty, empower women and youth, develop communities, provide disaster relief and create cultural understanding through education.
The Weston family	$2.3 billion	Innovations, healthcare, aging, environment
Phil Knight	$2 billion	Education, healthcare, intercollegiate athletics
James E. Stowers	$2 billion	Healthcare
Hansjoerg Wyss	$1.9 billion	Climate change, poverty
Howard Hughes	$1.56 billion	Healthcare
Ted Turner	$1 billion	United Nations Foundation
Stephan Schmidheiny	$1.5 billion	Environment, sustainable development
Vitalik Buterin	$1 billion	Donated $1 billion worth of the cryptocurrencies Shiba Inu and Ether to a COVID-19 relief fund in India.
Michael Jackson	$500 million+	Healthcare, poverty, youth, cancer research, education
T. Boone Pickens	$500 million	Education

== See also ==
- List of wealthiest charitable foundations
- Charitable organization
- Development charities
- Foundation (nonprofit)
- Non-profit organization
- Volunteer
- Volunteerism
