= Faceless Angel of Jeonju =

Anonymous donor in South Korea

"Faceless Angel"
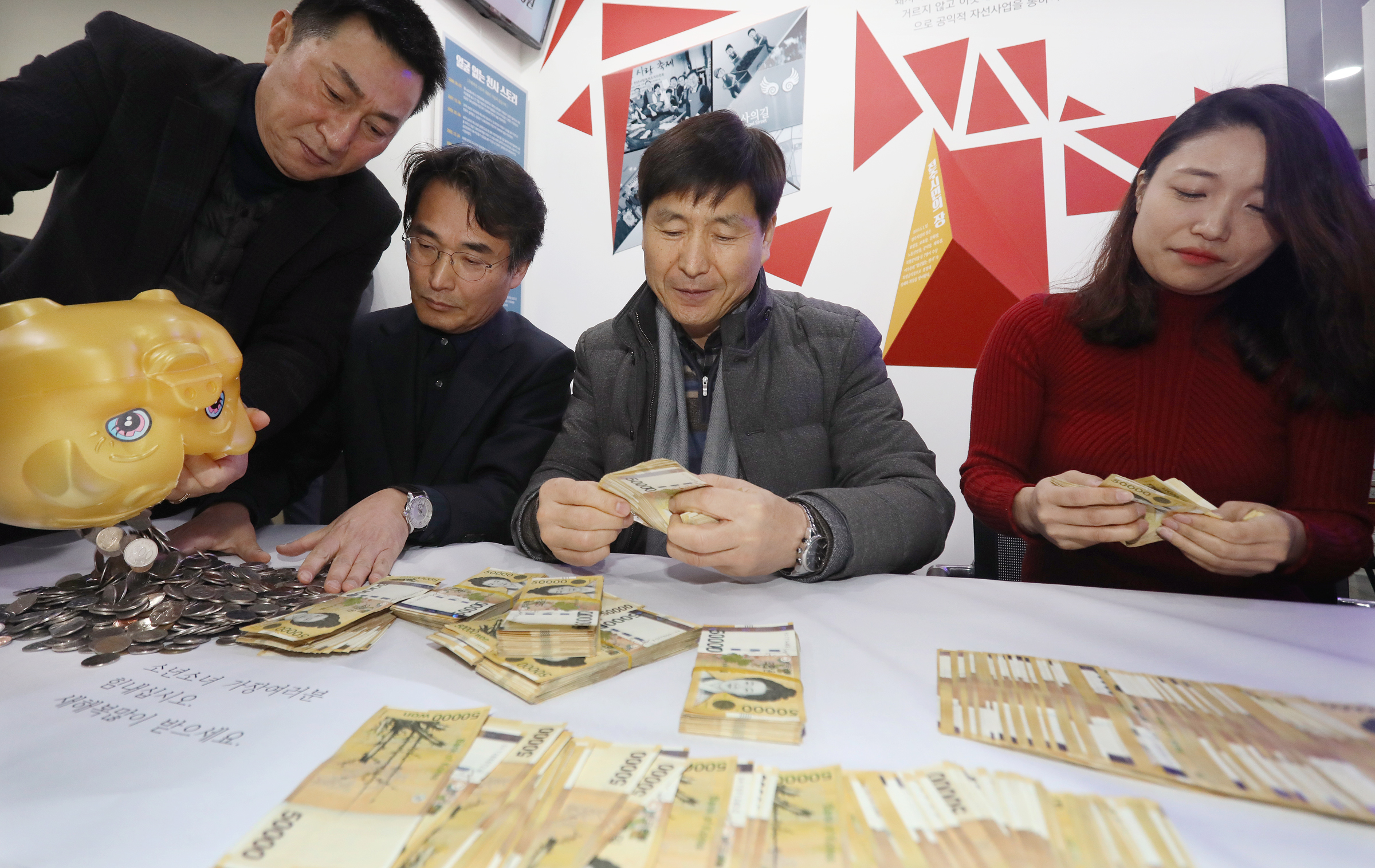
- Community center staff checking the donated money on December 27, 2018
- Years active: April 3, 2000 (first donation); December 30, 2025 (most recent donation)
- Awards: Special Public Interest Award, Jeonju Citizen's Award (2010); Grand Prize, HD Hyundai Honor Award (2023)

The Faceless Angel of Jeonju (Korean: 전주의 얼굴 없는 천사) is an unidentified benefactor who has been making donations to the Nosong-dong Community Center in Jeonju, North Jeolla Province, South Korea, for over twenty years. Donations by the Faceless Angel started in April 2000, and anonymous donations have continued around Christmas every year. The most recent donation was made on December 30, 2025, and the cumulative donation amount has reached ₩1,134,882,520 (US$846,753).

The Faceless Angel makes donations by placing donations, consisting mainly of cash and piggy banks, in an A4 paper box at a specific location near the community center and then calling the center to inform them of the location. Along with this, they put a simple note in the box wishing support to those in need; in some cases, they add other messages or leave nothing at all. They have become a topic of public discussion because they have been making such large donations for decades, while making a rigorous effort to keep their identity strictly private. Furthermore, every year-end, attention from not only the staff at the community center, but also the local community and the media, focuses on whether the "Faceless Angel" will visit.

The Faceless Angel's donations are distributed to low-income families and child heads of households in the region through the Community Chest of Korea. In 2009, a monument honoring the Faceless Angel's spirit was erected, and the area around the Nosong-dong Community Center was named "Angel's Path", with a memorial park also established. Local residents commemorate October 4 every year as "Angel's Day" and hold charity events for the needy. Cases of anonymous donations following the Faceless Angel's example have increased, and plays and movies inspired by their good deeds have also been produced.

== Identity ==
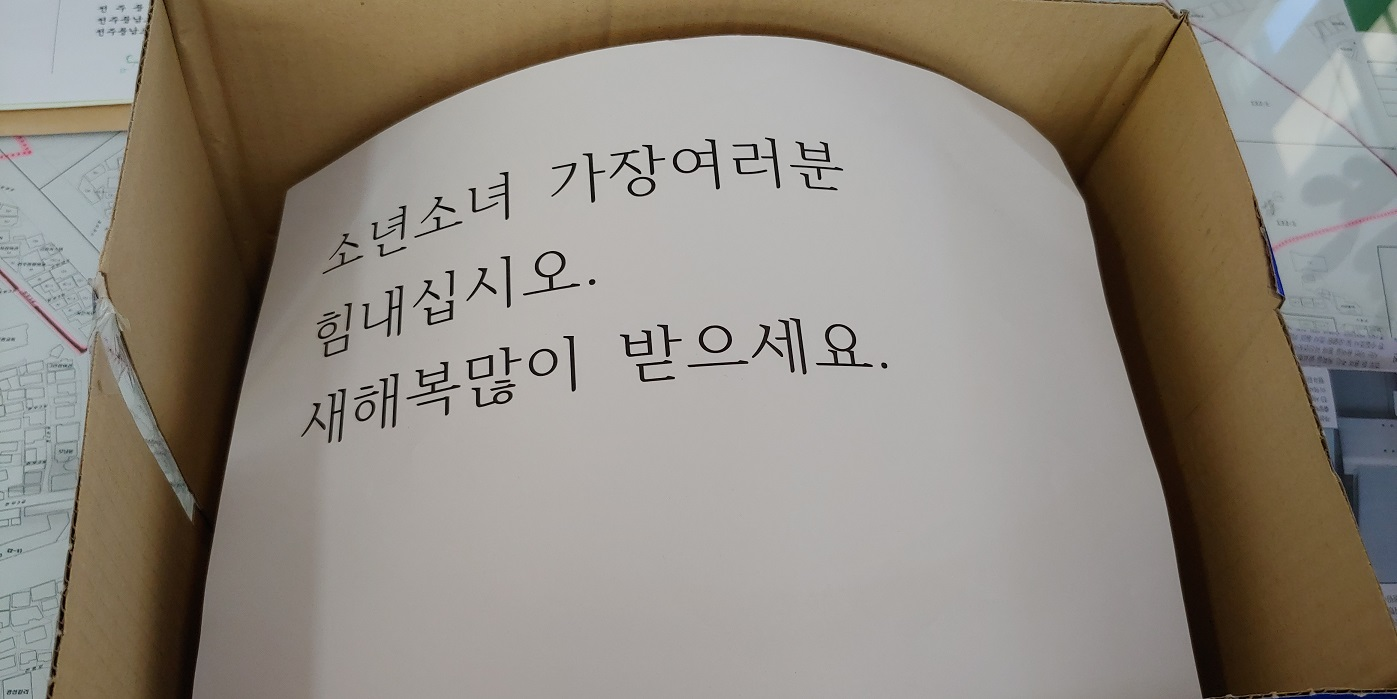
The note left during the 2018 donation

The Faceless Angel leaves donations at a specific location near the Nosong-dong Community Center in Jeonju, calls the center to inform them of the location, and then disappears; therefore, the Angel's identity—including name, age, face, and occupation—is completely unknown. Even the community center staff receiving the donations can only guess that it is the Faceless Angel who visits every year based on the voice on the phone, the method of delivery, and the content of the message. Judging by their voices over the phone, there has been speculation that a family takes turns performing these good deeds.

Since 2005, various theories have been raised regarding the Angel's identity. These included the theory that the Angel is a gang member or pimp who started performing good deeds to atone for past wrongdoings but finds it difficult to reveal their identity, or the theory that the Angel is a successful and deeply religious businessman who sets out to help the needy every year in memory of their impoverished childhood. At the time of the donation in 2009, the note mentioned that the donor was upholding the wishes of their late mother.

As public attention gradually increased, there were attempts to reveal the Angel's identity. In 2004, community center staff attempted to identify the donor, but failed because the donation date was moved. In 2009, marking the tenth year of donations, media interest surged; some media outlets even installed hidden cameras, but failed to track them down. Apparently aware of this, the donor delivered the donation a few days after the expected date. During the donation theft incident in 2019, the donor called the community center and asked them to be careful not to expose their vehicle and identity, even if a police investigation took place.

Meanwhile, some have criticized excessive interest in the Faceless Angel's identity. Jeonju City has stated that it will not track down the donor's identity in respect of their wish to remain anonymous, and in 2013, Yonhap News Agency argued for self-reflection on the excessive interest in the donor's identity.

== Activities ==
=== 2000–2004 ===
The activities of the Faceless Angel began on April 3, 2000. At the time, a male student who appeared to be in the third grade of elementary school visited the civil affairs office of Jungno-2-dong and placed a piggy bank containing 584,000 won on the counter with the words "Please help poor people". On December 26, 2001, another piggy bank containing 742,800 won was delivered anonymously to the community center.

On May 4, 2002, a man in his sixties called and left a bundle containing one million won in cash in front of the disabled assistance bell in front of the community center, asking that it be used for underprivileged children. On December 24, the same man called again, saying that there was a bundle containing a piggy bank and cash in the public phone booth next to the community center and that it be used to help the needy. The bundle contained one million won in cash and a piggy bank filled with 612,060 won in coins.

On the morning of December 23, 2003, a man believed to be in his thirties or forties called again, asking people to check the public phone booth next to the community center and that the money be used to help the needy. Inside a paper shopping bag in the booth was five million won in 10,000-won bills and a piggy bank filled with 367,330 won in coins. A note found inside the shopping bag read, "I am so happy that I was able to do more this year than in other years because I worked hard. I hope that at least in our neighborhood, there will be no children going hungry." The following year, on the morning of December 23, 2004, a man presumed to be in his fifties called and left a shopping bag containing cash, a piggy bank, and a note, just in the same location as before, at the monument in front of the community center. The donation amounted to five million won in cash and 448,350 won in coins.

=== 2005–2009 ===
At noon on December 26, 2005, a man presumed to be in his late thirties called. As Jungno 2-dong was merged into Nosong-dong due to the consolidation of administrative districts, the donation was delivered to the Nosong-dong office. Just like in previous years, a shopping bag containing cash and piggy banks was left in the flowerbed next to the underground parking lot of the dong office; it contained ten million won in cash and 455,180 won in coins. A note included with the bag read, "It snowed too much this year. Please give this to neighbors who are shivering in the cold." (Note: In December 2005, record snowfall occurred in North Jeolla Province. Jeongeup recorded up to 47 cm of snow, while Gochang recorded a cumulative snowfall of 200 cm. Schools were closed in areas affected by the heavy snow, and hundreds of billions of won in property damage occurred due to the collapse of facilities, including greenhouses. President Roh Moo-hyun also visited the recovery site. Jeonju was also affected by the heavy snowfall, and the Honam region, including the affected areas, was declared a special disaster area.) On December 21, 2006, a man believed to be in his forties had left a donation in the same location. The shopping bag contained eight million won in cash and 513,210 won in coins (three piggy banks), and a note read, "I am so happy and grateful to be able to share our family's small sincerity with neighbors in need." At 11:00 AM on December 27, 2007, a man in his late thirties called and said he had left a donation in the exact same spot as the previous year, and a donation of 298,100 won in coins and twenty million won in cash was found.

At 1:40 PM on December 23, 2008, a man in his thirties called and said he had also left a donation in the exact same spot, and a donation of twenty million won in cash and 381,000 won in coins was found. The message written on the note was, "To all the young heads of households! Stay strong." In 2009, as media interest increased, a call was made past Christmas on December 28 at 11:55 AM. The delivery location was also changed to next to a vending machine in the open space of the community center, and a cardboard box containing a piggy bank and bundles of cash was left. The donation amounted to 80 million won and 265,920 won in coins, marking the tenth year of donations. A note included with the donation read: "Just as all mothers in Korea did, this is money my mother saved by not spending it and being frugal. I hope this will be used to help neighbors in need, honoring my mother's wishes. Happy New Year. I want to convey my respect and love to my mother in heaven."

=== 2010–2018 ===
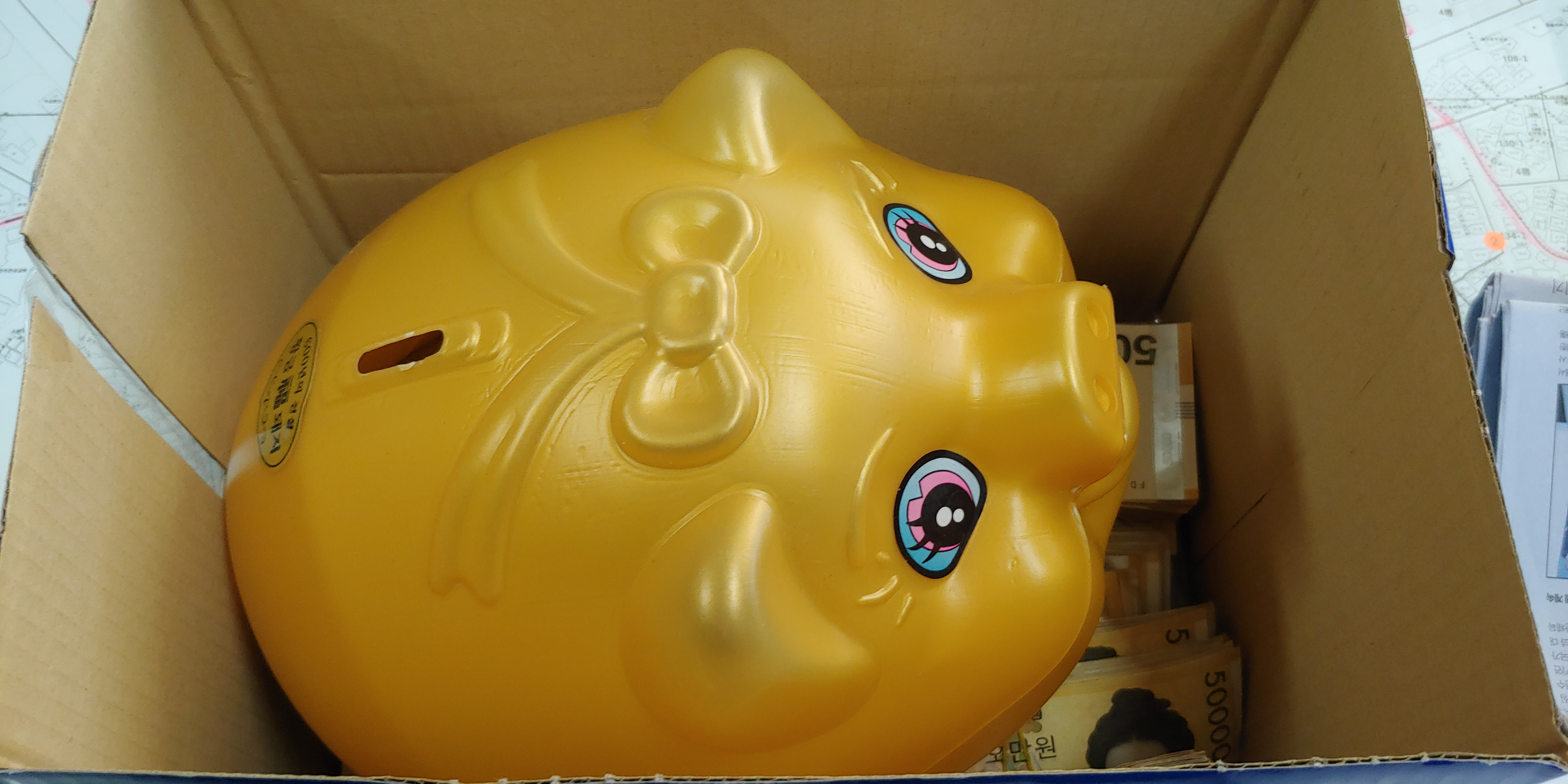
The money donated in 2018. The donation, consisting of 50,000 won banknotes and coins from piggy banks, was worth about 50 million won.

At 11:55 AM on December 28, 2010, a man presumed to be in his forties called and hung up after saying, "We do something every year to show our sincerity; please check the flowerbed in the alley next to the hair salon near the community center." A piggy bank and cash were delivered inside an A4 cardboard box to a different location than in previous years, and the donations for this year totaled 35 million won in cash and 341,620 won in coins. No note was left. The following year, at 12:10 PM on December 20, 2011, a man in his forties called and said, "There is a money box under a Trajet XG parked on the road next to Woori Laundry near the community center, so please come and pick it up." Inside an A4 cardboard box was a donation totaling 50,242,100 won, including ten envelopes containing 100 50,000-won bills each and 242,100 won in coins from a piggy bank. That year, they left a simple note saying, "Please help neighbors in need. Stay strong and have a Happy New Year."

At 1:53 PM on December 27, 2012, a man presumed to be in his fifties or sixties called and said, "Look near the 'Faceless Angel Monument' in the flowerbed near the community center. Please use this for neighbors in need." As in previous years, an A4 cardboard box contained 50 million won in 50,000-won bills and a piggy bank, and the total donation amounted to 50,304,600 won. No note was left this year. At 11:15 AM on December 30, 2013, a man in his fifties asked to check the same spot as the previous year, and a donation totaling 49,246,740 won, including bills and a piggy bank, was delivered. A note was also delivered saying, "To all the young heads of households, please stay strong even if things are difficult, and happy New Year." The following year, at 3:40 PM on December 29, 2014, a man presumed to be in their forties called again. "I am short on time, so I am leaving a box behind the vehicle next to the laundry. Please pick it up quickly before someone else takes it. Please make sure to use it for the needy," and the total amount of donations received reached 50,304,390 won. This year, a note with a similar message to the previous year was added.

At 9:53 AM on December 30, 2015, a man in his forties or fifties called and said that money was placed in the woods near the streetlights in the park behind the community center. The method of donation was the same as in previous years, and the enclosed note also contained a message of support for child heads of households. The total amount of donations reached 50,339,810 won. At 11:08 AM on December 28, 2016, a man presumed to be in his fifties called and left a message saying to check the forest in Cheonsa Park behind the community center. A note was found with the donation of 50,217,940 won, which read, "To all young heads of households, it has been a difficult year, but I hope you do not forget that we have the gift of hope. Happy New Year." At 11:26 AM on December 28, 2017, a middle-aged man called and said that he had left the items in the same location. Inside the box was a donation of 60,279,210 won, consisting of 50,000-won bills and a piggy bank, along with a note that read, "To all young heads of households, you have worked hard through a difficult year. I believe things will be better next year. Happy New Year." At 9:07 AM on December 27, 2018, a man called and asked that the contents of a box of A4 paper located at the entrance of the community center's underground parking lot be used for neighbors in need. The donation for that year amounted to 50,201,950 won, and a note was also left saying, "To all the young heads of households, you have worked hard. Stay strong in the New Year."

=== 2019 donation theft incident ===
Around 10:03 AM on December 30, 2019, a man called to express his intention to donate, stating, "I have placed a box containing donation money behind the community center, so please check it." A community center employee visited the location, but the donation box was not there. The man called three more times, repeatedly providing the location of the box by asking, "There is a box behind (the community center)", "Have you found the donation?" and "Have you not found the item yet?" The staff searched the area thoroughly for over thirty minutes but failed to find it, eventually reporting the theft to the police at 10:37 AM. The man, who made a fifth call at 10:46 AM, was reportedly very distressed upon hearing the news that the donation had disappeared.

Upon receiving the report, the police faced difficulties in the investigation due to the lack of CCTV cameras near the scene, but they apprehended two thieves at their homes in Gyeryong, South Chungcheong Province, just four hours after the crime. The suspects were high school friends in their thirties who had been staking out the community center in an SUV for several days prior to the donation before stealing the money. However, a resident who found this suspicious wrote down the license plate number in advance and reported it immediately, leading to a swift arrest. The perpetrators were sentenced to one year and six months and one year in prison, respectively, at the appeal trial in June 2020.

On January 2, 2020, Kim Young-geun, the head of the Criminal Investigation Division of Wansan District Police Station, delivered the recovered donation to Choi Gyu-jong, the head of Nosong-dong. The donation, contained in an A4 paper box, included 60 million won in cash and a piggy bank filled with coins, totaling 60,163,210 won, along with a note that read, "Cheer up, child heads of households."

=== 2020s ===
In the following year, there were concerns that the donation might not come due to the theft case and the COVID-19 pandemic. However, at 11:24 AM on December 29, 2020, a man in his fifties called the community center and said that he had placed an A4 paper box in an alleyway and hoped it would help people struggling because of the pandemic. Inside the box were 70,128,980 won in cash, along with the message: "I apologize for the commotion caused by me last year. It was a difficult year due to COVID-19. I believe you will overcome it." Inside was a piece of paper with the words, "Happy New Year to all child heads of households, and stay healthy."

At 10:05 AM on December 29, 2021, an anonymous call stated that a donation had been left in the cargo compartment of a truck in front of Seongsan Church. The donation for that year amounted to 70,094,960 won, along with a note containing a message of support for child heads of households and the words, "Please help our underprivileged neighbors, and I hope you have a warm year." Around 11:01 AM on December 27, 2022, a middle-aged man called the community center, stating that a box had been placed under a kindergarten vehicle in front of Seongsan Church. The total cash amounted to 76,005,580 won. A letter included with the cash read, "I hope this will be of some small help to the students in Jeonju who have to give up their dreams due to a lack of college tuition, and to the child heads of households. Stay strong and I hope all your dreams come true. Happy New Year."

At 10:13 AM on December 27, 2023, a middle-aged man called and said that he had placed a box behind a church sign near the community center. The donation was 80,063,980 won. A message read, "You have worked hard this year. Please help our neighbors in need. Thank you." Around 9:26 AM on December 20, 2024, a middle-aged man called and said, "I have placed (the donation) under a truck opposite the Gijachon restaurant, so please use it for the needy." Along with 80,038,850 won in cash, a letter was left that read, "To all young heads of households, have a warm year and a Happy New Year."

Around 3:43 PM on December 30, 2025, a middle-aged man called the community center. The staff found a 90,046,000 won donation with a note that read "I hope 2026 will be filled only with good things. Wishing you good health and a Happy New Year." The cumulative donation reached 1,134,882,520 won.

== Use of donations ==
The donations from the Faceless Angel are used to help needy neighbors in the Nosong-dong area through the North Jeolla Province Community Chest of Korea. The Nosong-dong Community Center has been distributing fixed amounts to selected low-income households rather than providing concentrated support to specific individuals. This is in response to the Faceless Angel's request that the funds be used for vulnerable groups, including the elderly living alone, child heads of households, and grandparent-headed households.

In the early days, the funds were mainly used to purchase rice and yeontan, but starting in 2002, cash payments ranging from 100,000 to 300,000 won per household began to be distributed. Since 2017, scholarships have been awarded annually to twenty students from five schools in Nosong-dong. In 2022, at the Angel’s request, 70 million won was provided to help cover tuition fees for 35 university students in Jeonju. In 2024, the donations expanded beyond Nosong-dong to include vulnerable residents in neighboring administrative districts (Pungnam-dong, Jungang-dong, Inhu-dong 1 to 3, and Jinbuk-dong) with each recipient receiving 200,000 won in cash. As of 2026, 7,200 households in Nosong-dong and nearby areas benefited from the Faceless Angel's donations.

== Influence ==
=== Commemorations ===
The Faceless Angel has been commemorated through memorial installations, cultural projects, and awards. On September 4, 2009, Song Ha-jin, the mayor of Jeonju, announced that a road near the community center would be designated as a memorial road. Also, a memorial stone for the Faceless Angel was completed in December 2009 and was erected in the flowerbed in front of the community center on January 12, 2010. It is 1.2 meters wide and one meter high, and engraved with the words "Faceless Angel, you are a true person who makes the world bright and beautiful like a candle in the darkness. We love you." In the same year, the name of the 750m stretch of road in front of the community center was changed to "Faceless Angel Street".

Starting in 2011, a project to develop the villages around Nosong-dong into "Angel Village" was implemented, and cultural spaces for residents and theme zones were constructed. In October 2012, a two kilometer section from the Roman Catholic Diocese of Jeonju to the Nosong-dong Community Center was designated as "Angel's Path". In February 2015, a mural titled "Angel's Wings" was erected to honor the Faceless Angel. In February 2020, a sculpture commemorating the twentieth anniversary of the Faceless Angel's donation was installed in Angel Park.

On April 19, 2010, Jeonju City selected the Faceless Angel as the recipient of the Special Public Service Award of Jeonju Citizen's Award. The plaque was given to the Angel Monument Promotion Committee and later displayed at the community center. In 2023, they were selected as the recipient of the Grand Prize of the HD Hyundai Honor Award, presented by the HD Hyundai 1% Sharing Foundation to citizen heroes. The prize money of 200 million won was used to help the underprivileged. In 2026, they were registered as a member of Honor Society, a major-donor association established in 2007 to promote charity.

Works of art were produced to honor the Faceless Angel. In December 2011, Changjak Geukhoe, a theater group from North Jeolla Province, presented the play Nosong-dong Angel, which centers on a conflict between a reporter trying to uncover the identity of the Angel and a local resident against it. In April 2017, the film Finding Angel (천사는 바이러스) was screened at the Jeonju International Film Festival. Produced by the Jeonju Film Commission and directed by Kim Sung-jun, the film is about a reporter visiting the Nosong-dong Community Center to cover the Faceless Angel. It was released in general theaters on January 6, 2021.

=== Spread of donations ===
Influenced by the Faceless Angel, anonymous donations mimicking them have occurred in Jeonju. In 2009, the Dong-A Ilbo reported that a "Faceless Angel Syndrome" was emerging in Jeonju where people left money or rice at community centers without revealing their identities. On December 16, 2009, "anonymous angels" deposited 3.17 million won at the community centers of Palbok-dong, Seosin-dong, and Wansan-dong and there were more than ten instances of money and rice being left at community centers in the city that month alone. In 2011, the Nosong-dong Community Center stated that they receive about thirty to fifty donations after the Angel visits. In 2017, the JoongAng Ilbo reported that the "Angel Effect" had occurred nationwide with an increasing number of citizens sponsoring various welfare projects promoted by Jeonju City such as the "Mother's Table for Children Who Go Hungry" without revealing their identities.

To emulate the good deeds of the Faceless Angel, the residents of Nosong-dong designated October 4 as "Angel Day" as the number 1004 and angel are both pronounced as cheonsa in Korean. In addition, they have held the "Angel Festival" with six neighboring towns since 2011 to help underprivileged neighbors.

== See also ==
- List of philanthropists
