= Jeonju National Museum =

National museum in Jeonju, South Korea

Coordinates: 35.8010°N 127.0897°E

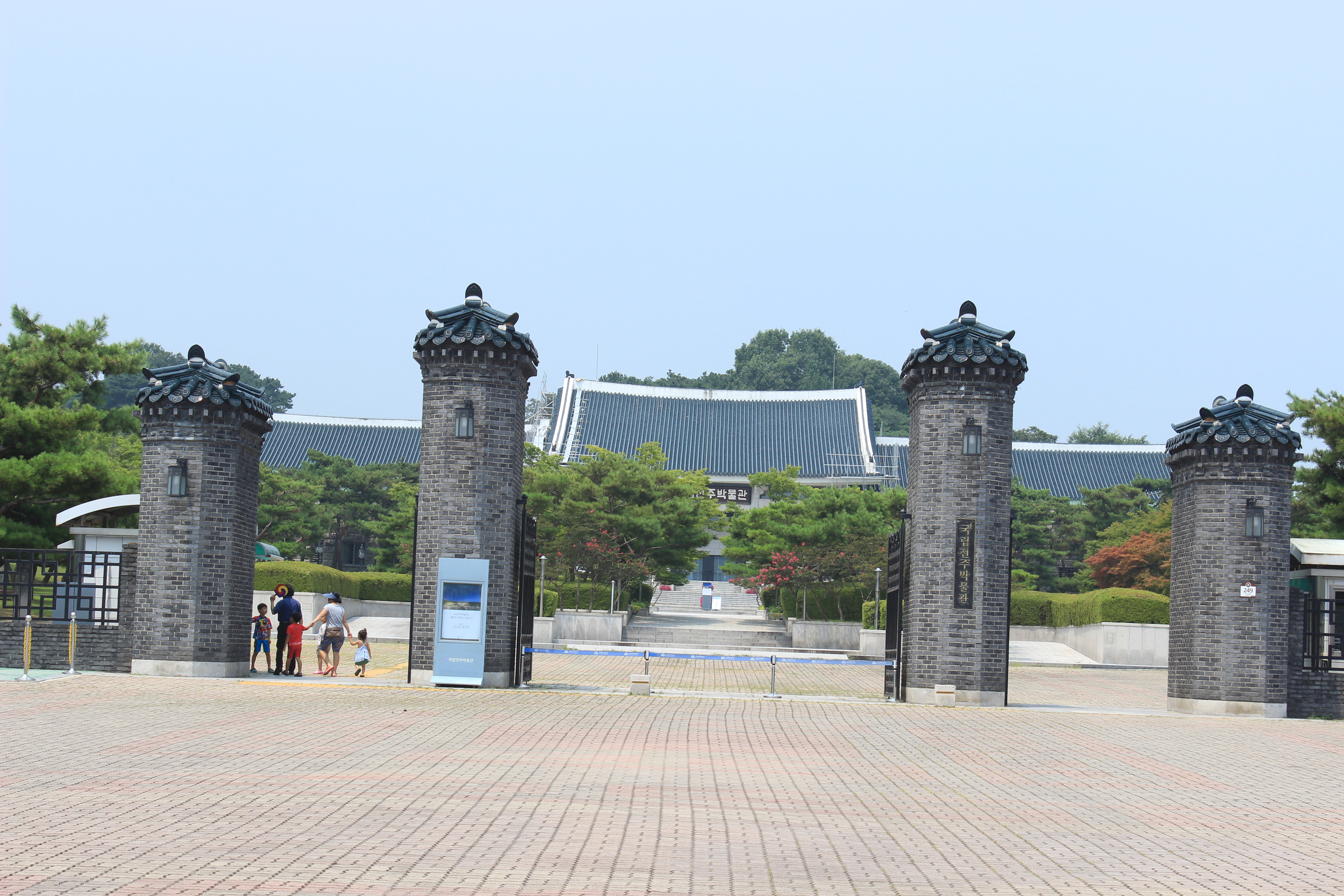
- Location: 249 Ssukgogae-ro, Wansan-gu, Jeonju-si, Jeollabuk-do, 55070, Republic of Korea

- Jeonju National Museum
- Hangul: 국립전주박물관
- Hanja: 國立全州博物館
- RR: Gungnip Jeonju bangmulgwan
- MR: Kungnip Chŏnju pangmulgwan

Jeonju National Museum (Korean: 국립전주박물관) is a national museum located in Jeonju, Jeollabuk-do, South Korea. It opened on October 26, 1990, as the ninth South Korean national museum.

The Main Building comprises three permanent exhibits, an Archeology room, a Fine Art room, a Folklore room, and one special exhibit room.

== See also ==
- List of museums in South Korea
