= Lucia Hou =

Australian personality (born 1976)

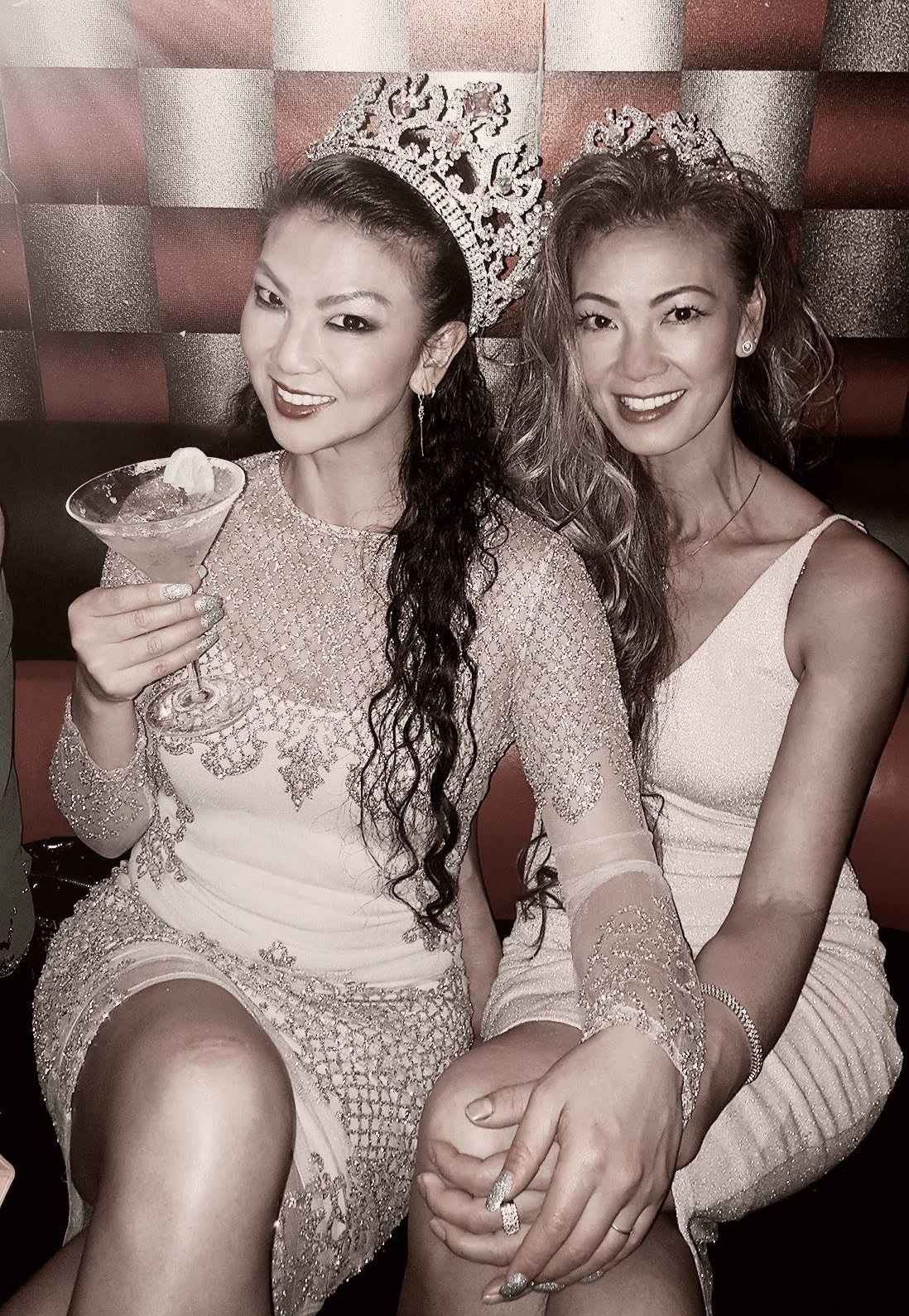
- Hou with sister Kim Michael
- Born: April 28, 1976 (age 49); Thakhek, Laos
- Occupation(s): Philanthropist; Photographer; Painter; Plasterer
- Children: 2
- Website: Official website

Lucia Hou is an Australia philanthropist, photographer, media manager, and a winner of several beauty titles. She featured in over 50 magazines and news articles and was awarded the 2018 Woman of Year internationally by World Class Beauty Queen for her philanthropy work. Hou made the front cover of Influential People magazine as top a 10 Influential woman of the year (2018).

== Early life ==
Hou was the youngest of 11 children. She was born in Laos in 1976 and came to Australia at age one.

She has two children. Hou told Herald Sun she got involved with charities to be a good role model for her children and to leave a legacy. Hou and her family escaped during the war in Laos across the Mekong River while soldiers guarded the banks, settling in Australia.

== Philanthropy ==
Hou has worked with many charities and non-profit organizations such as;

- Charity Partner of Bully Zero Australia
- partner of the Australian Teenage Expo
- Partner of Sonya and Sacha Show.
- Project Karma Ambassador
- The Victorian Cultural Association Inc.
- The Holi Festival
- Indian Film Festival of Melbourne
- Heart Kids Australia
- Women In Need Foundation
- Western Health Foundation
- CDF Transport Charity
- Scleroderma Australia
- Anti Poverty Week
- Hou has been appointed as of 2019 multicultural ambassador for Mental Health Foundation Australia (MHFA).

== Career ==
Hou runs a building and maintenance company as is a professional photographer, and is a trained painter and plasterer.

== Awards ==
- Mrs Coral Sea Globe (2016)
- Mrs Oceana Globe (2017)
- Woman of the year World Class Beauty Queens (2018)

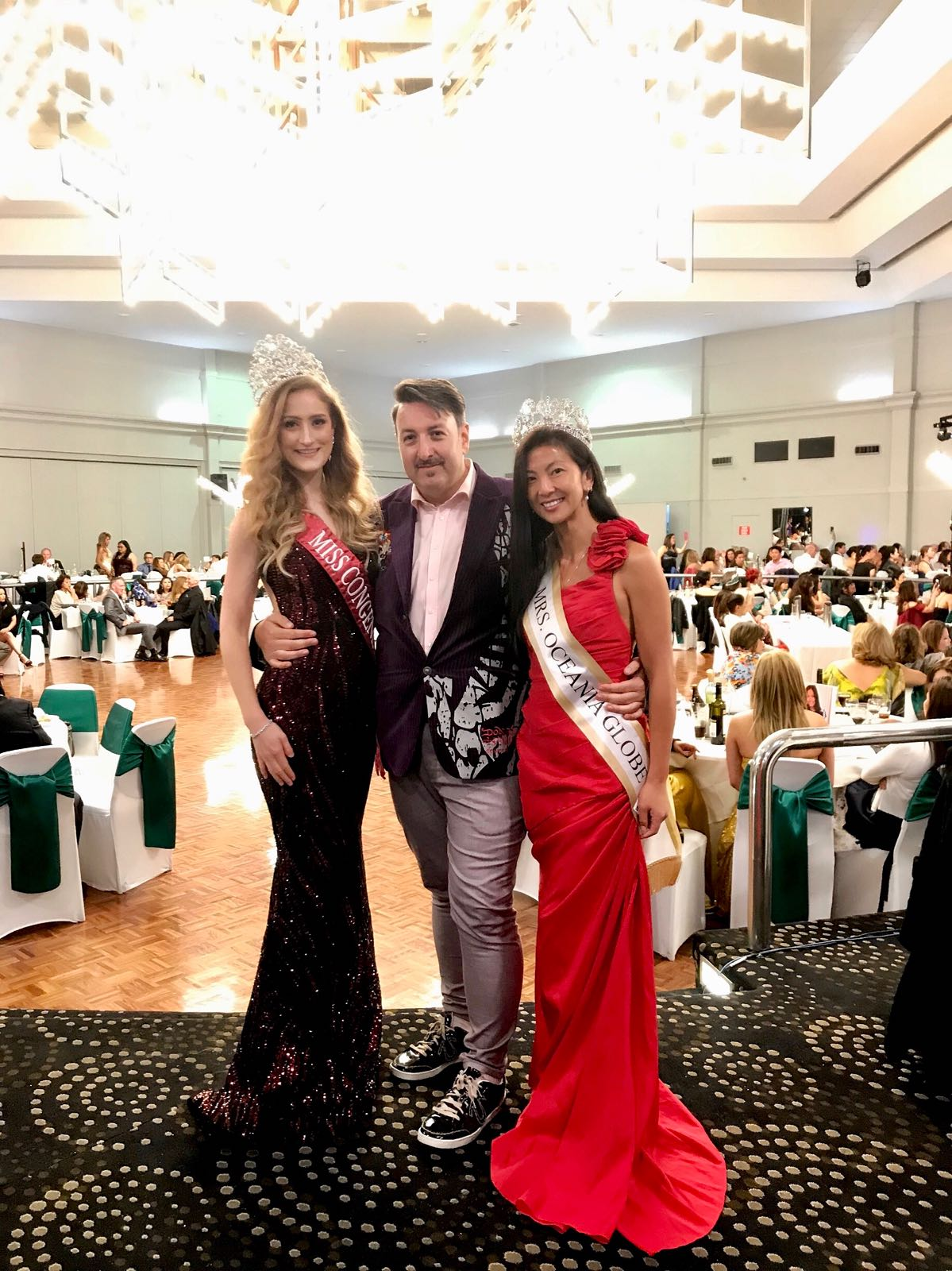
Lucia Hou in her Mrs Oceana sash
