= Jeonju =

City in North Jeolla, South Korea

- Specific city
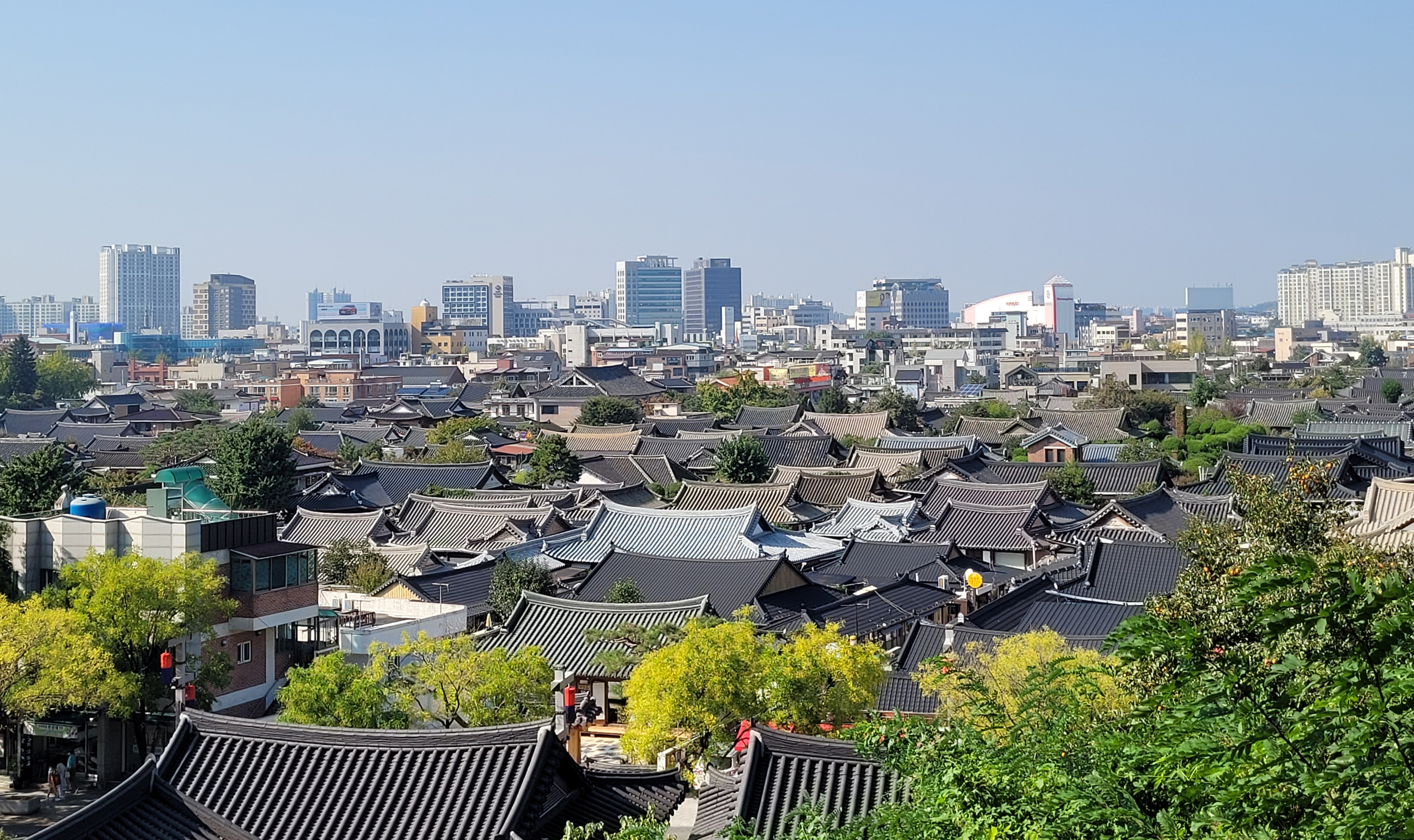
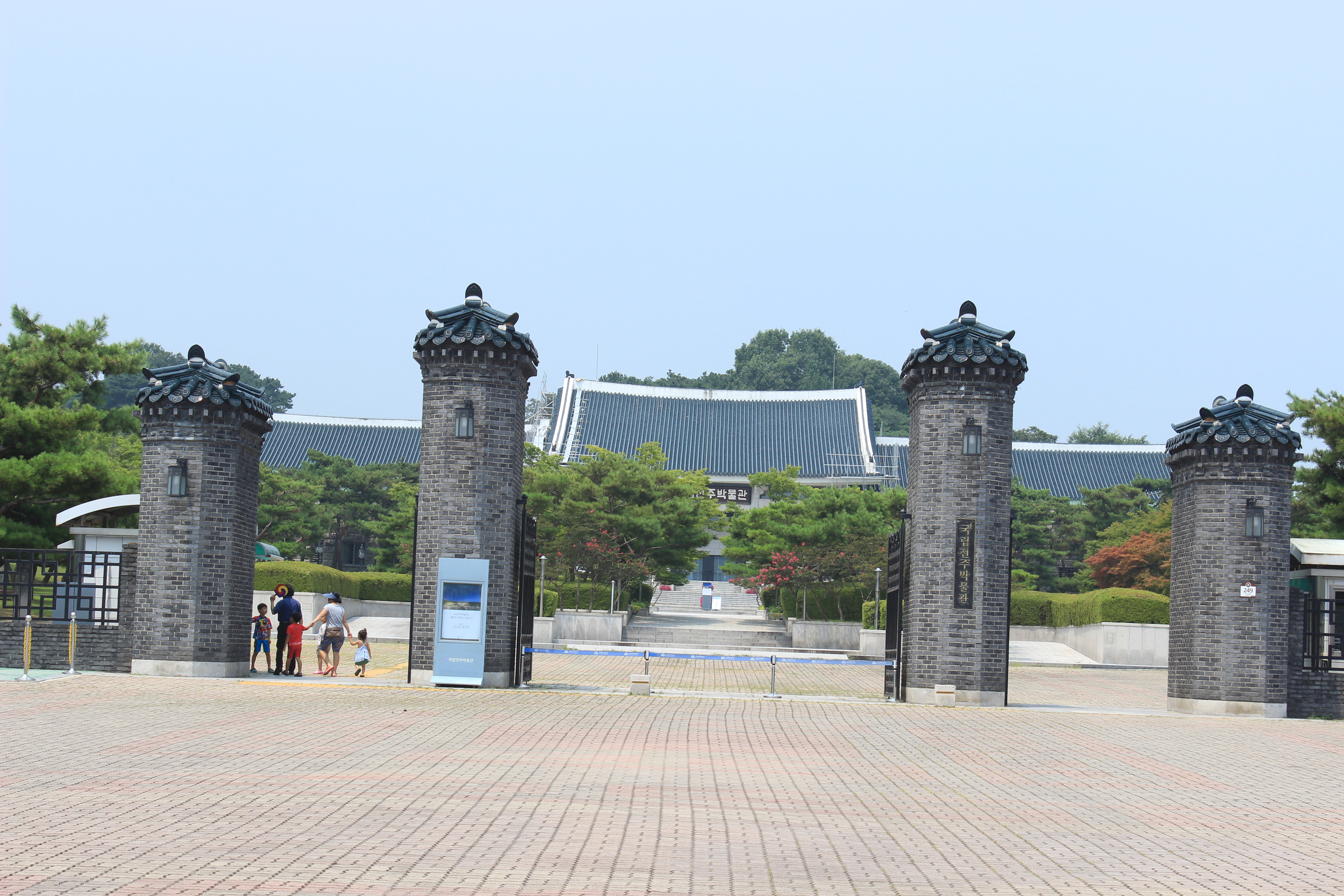
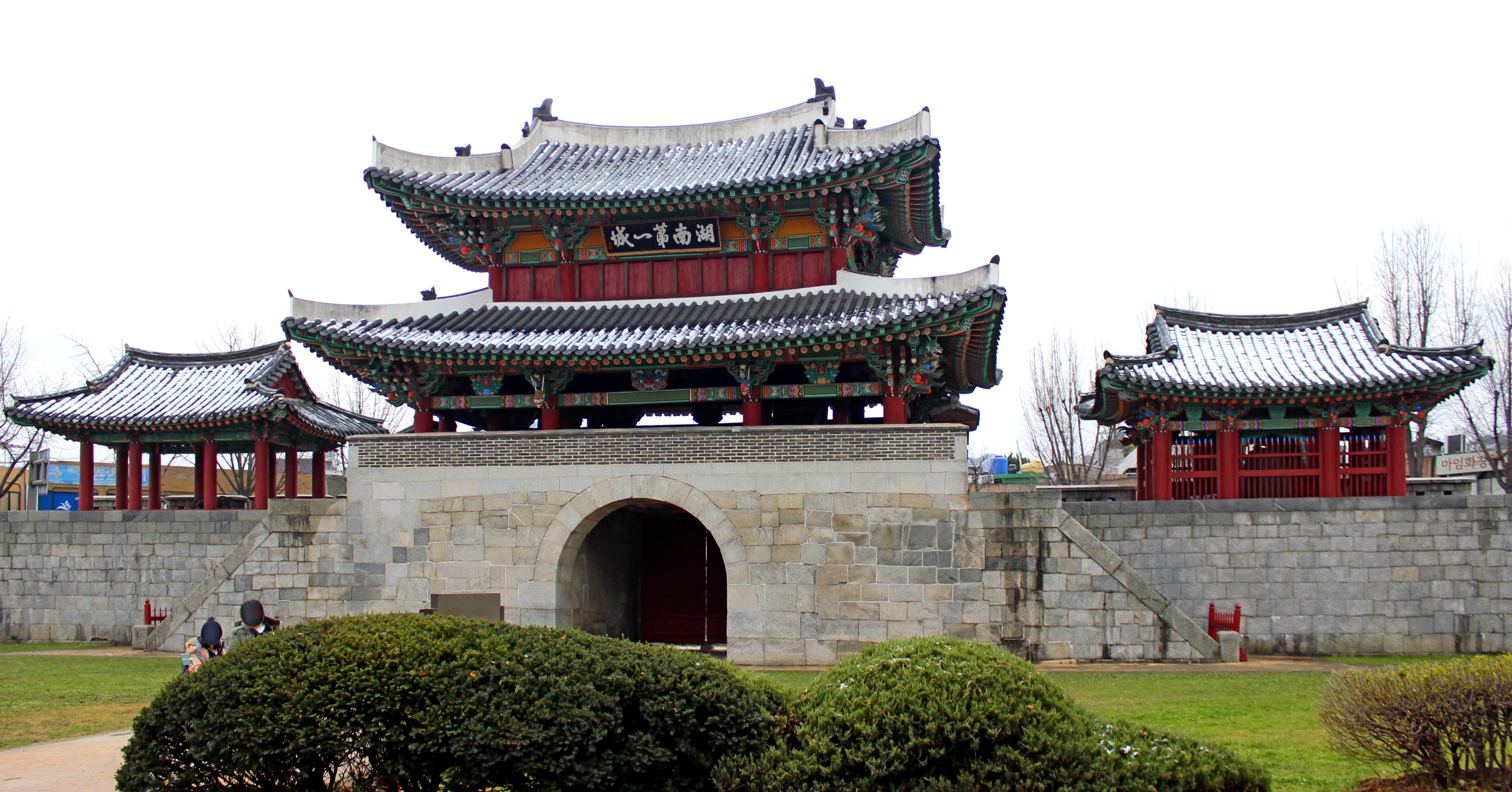
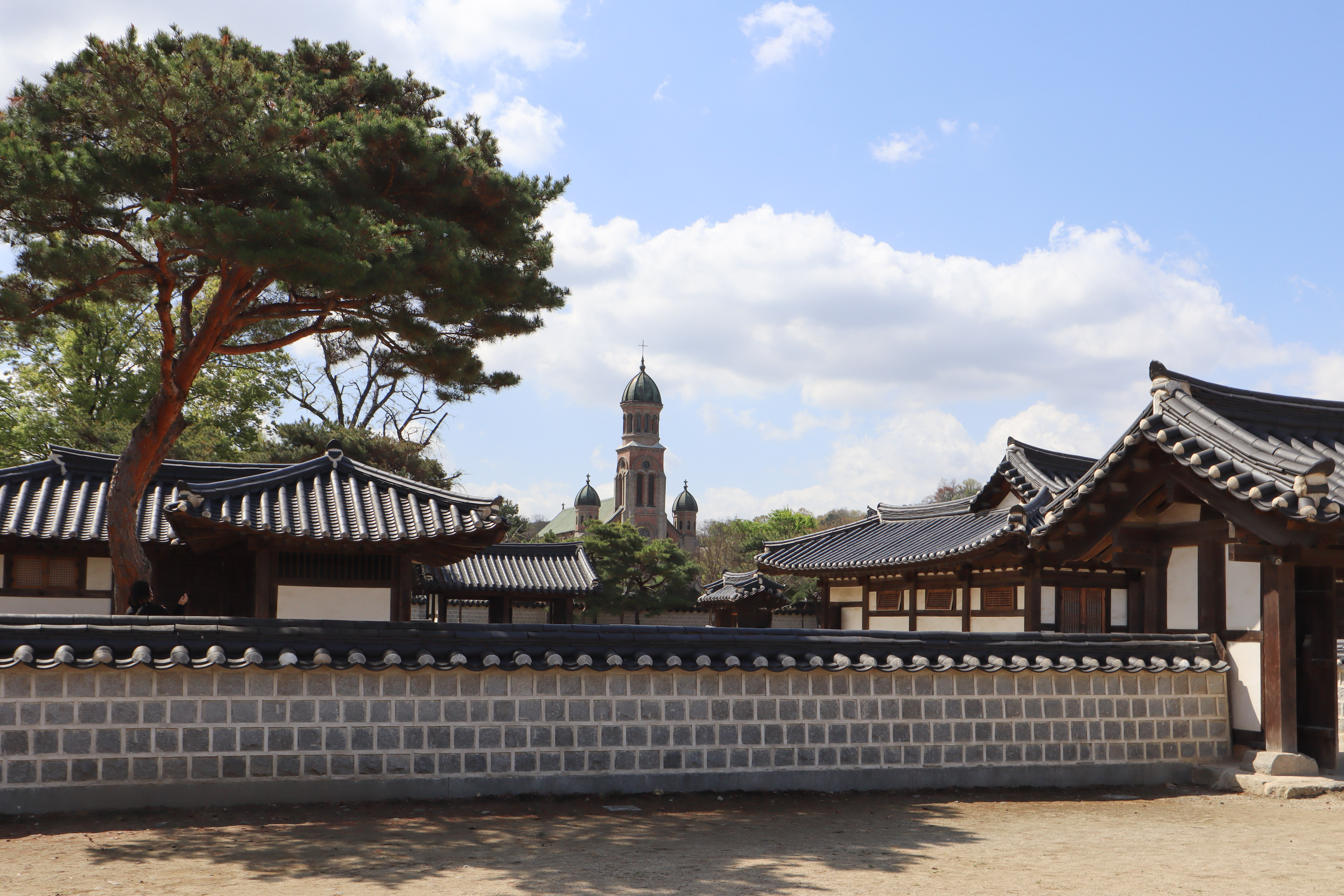
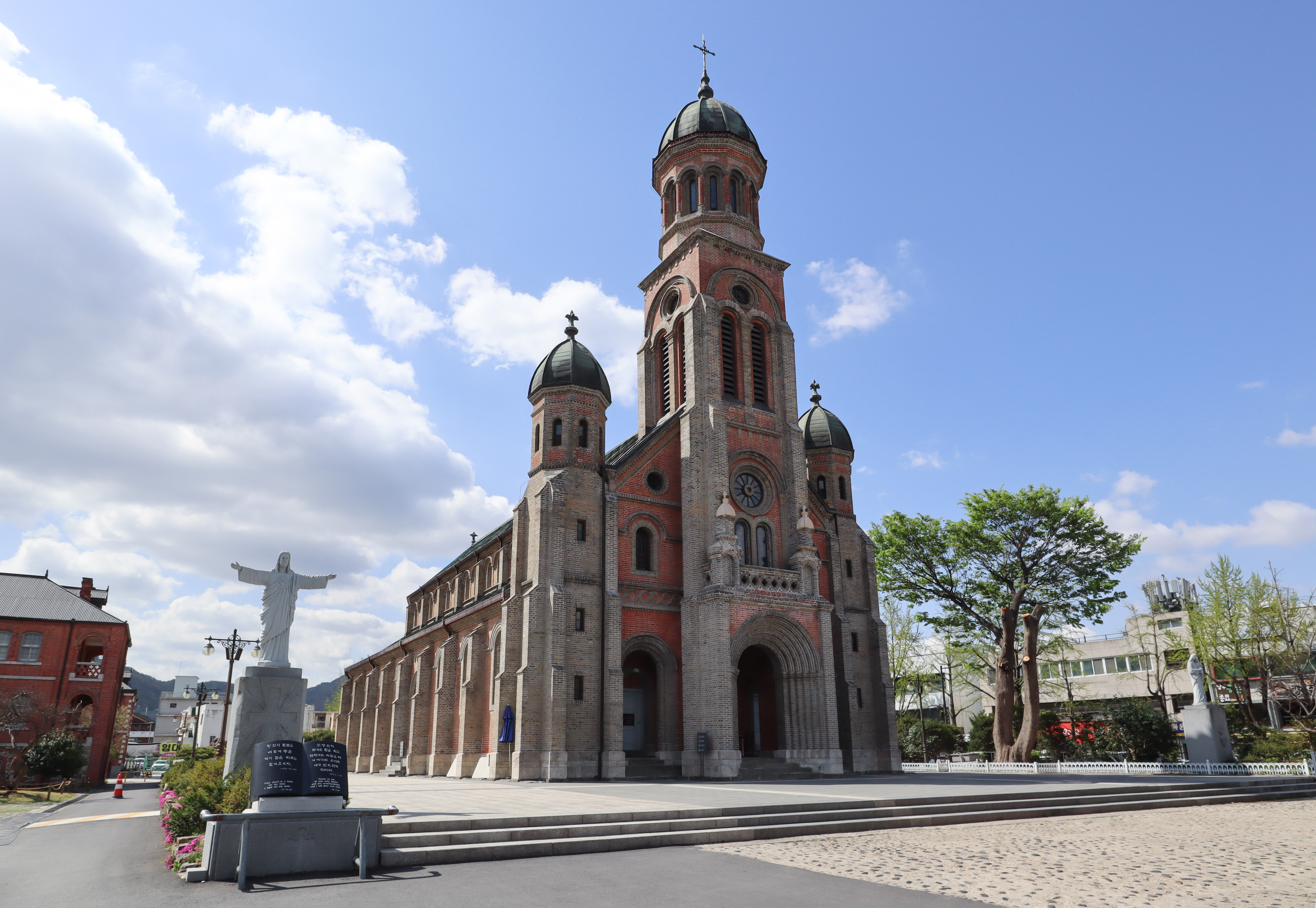
- Jeonju Hanok Village Jeonju National Museum Pungnammun Gyeonggijeon Jeondong Cathedral

- Flag Logo

- Location in South Korea
- Coordinates: 35°49′26″N 127°8′51″E
- Country: South Korea
- Province: Jeonbuk
- Administrative divisions: 2 Gu, 40 dong

Government
  - Type: City government
  - Mayor: Cho Ji Hun (Democratic)
  - Council: Jeonju City Council

Area
  - Total: 206.22 km^{2} (79.62 sq mi)

Population (February 2026)
  - Total: 638,421
  - Density: 3,164/km^{2} (8,190/sq mi)
  - Dialect: Jeolla
- Time zone: UTC+9
- ZIP codes: 560011-561870
- Area Code: +82-63-2xx
- Website: Official website

Korean name
- Hangul: 전주시
- Hanja: 全州市
- RR: Jeonju-si
- MR: Chŏnju-si

Jeonju (Korean: 전주; Korean pronunciation: [t͡ɕʌɲ.d͡ʑu], lit. 'Perfect region') (Note: The name Jeonju literally means "Perfect Region" (from the hanja 全 [전; jeon] for perfect, 州 [주; ju] for region)) is the capital and largest city of the province of Jeonbuk, South Korea. It is both urban and rural due to the closeness of Wanju County which almost entirely surrounds Jeonju (Wanju County has many residents who work in Jeonju). It is an important tourist center famous for South Korean cuisine, historic buildings, sports activities, and innovative festivals.

In May 2012, Jeonju was chosen as a Creative City for Gastronomy as part of UNESCO's Creative Cities Network. This honor recognizes the city's traditional home cooking handed down over thousands of years, its active public and private food research, a system of nurturing talented chefs, and its hosting of distinctive food festivals.

Jeonju is a city with over 1,300 years of history and culture. The city has produced many scholars and has a developed publishing industry.

== Cityscape ==
Gallery

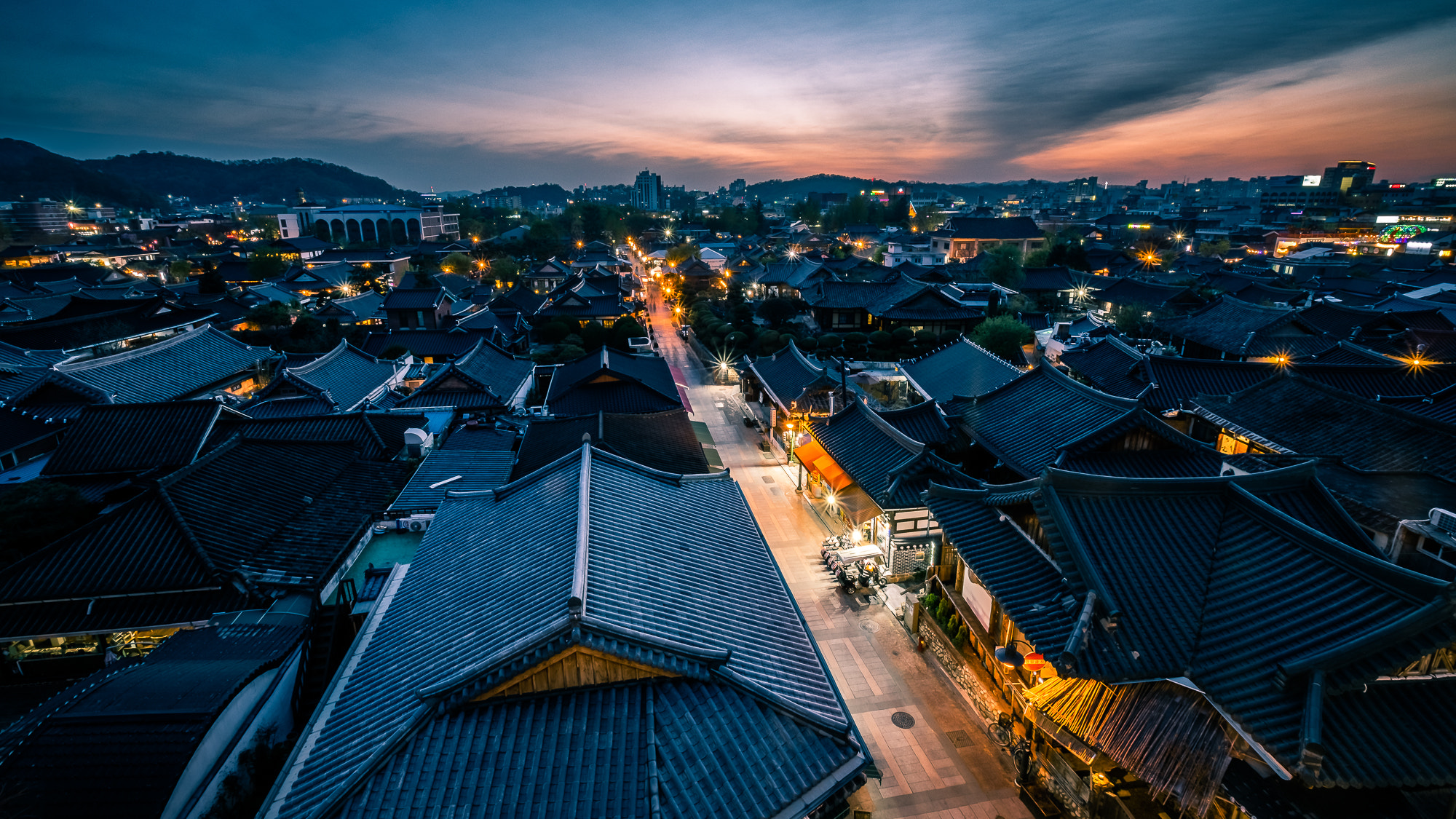
Jeonju Hanok Village

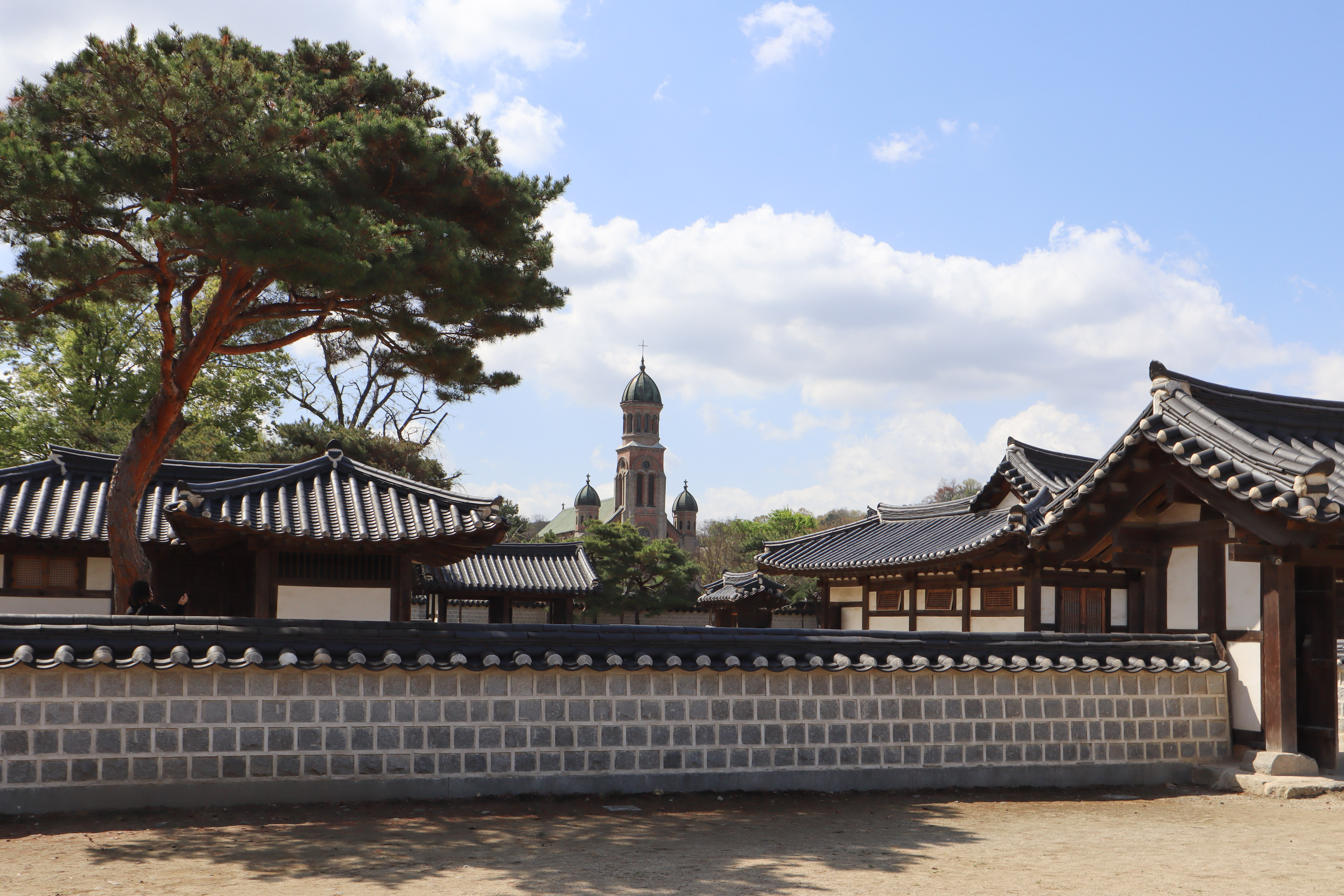
Gyeonggijeon

== Geography and administrative divisions ==
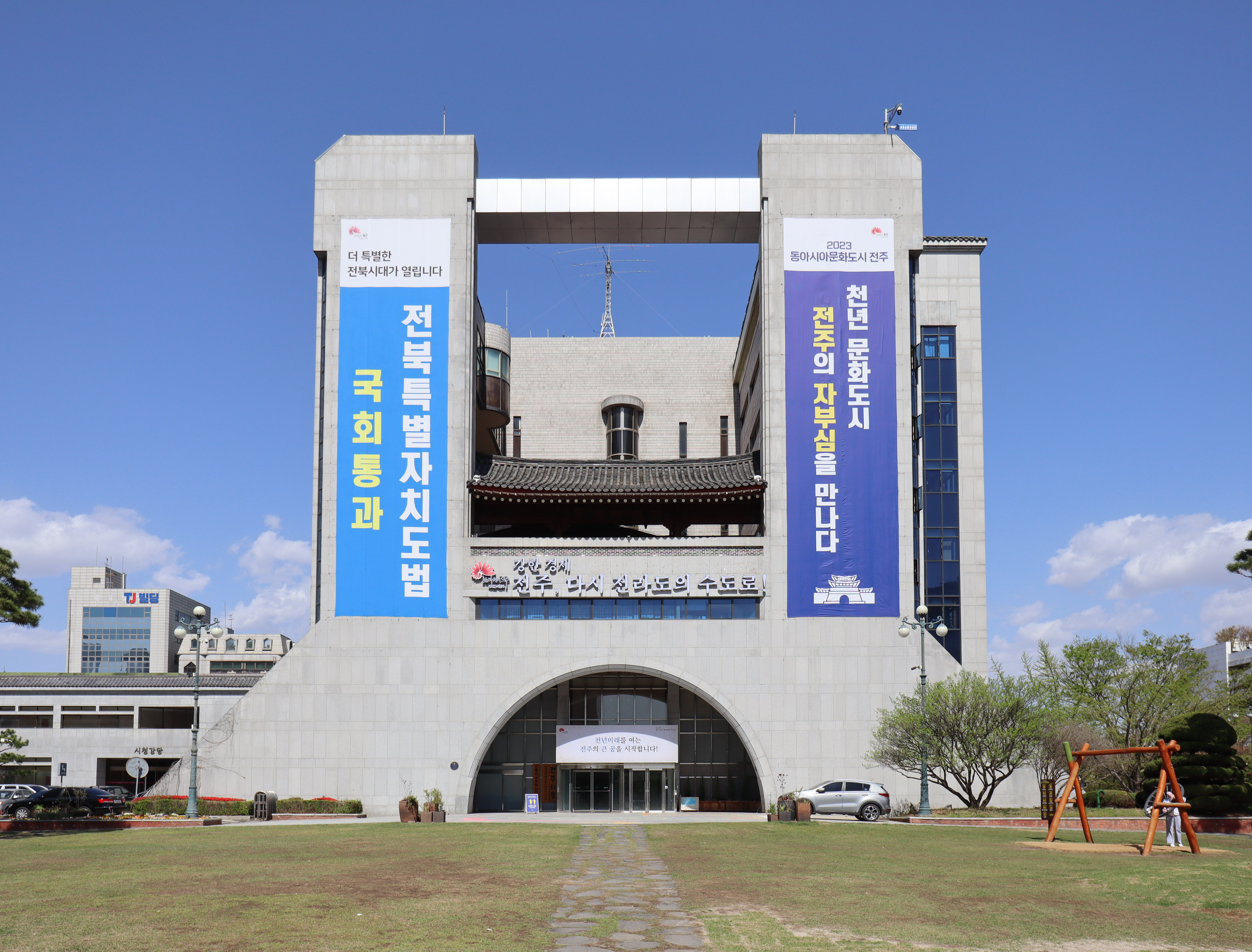
Jeonju City Hall

Jeonju is primarily situated in a basin surrounded by mountains such as Moryongsan to the north and Namgosan to the south, with the Jeonjucheon River flowing through the center of the city as a major ecological axis.

=== Administrative divisions ===
Jeonju is divided into two wards, Deokjin District and Wansan District that, in turn, are divided into approximately 40 neighborhoods.

=== Climate ===
Jeonju has a cooler version of a humid subtropical climate (Köppen climate classification Cwa), with winter being warm enough to avoid being classified as an humid continental (Dwa) if the 0 °C isotherm is used.

Jeonju, like all of Korea, has four distinct seasons (spring, summer, fall, and winter). The winters can have a mix of days that are cool to days that are quite cold. The colder days are often influenced by a high pressure front that brings cold air from Siberia.

In the summer, the humidity of Southeast Asia comes over the Korean peninsula from June through September. Temperatures in spring (late April and through May) and fall (after September 25 and through October) are often in the mid-20s°C and with low humidity.

Climate data for Jeonju (1991–2020 normals, extremes 1918–present)
Month	Jan	Feb	Mar	Apr	May	Jun	Jul	Aug	Sep	Oct	Nov	Dec	Year
Record high °C (°F)	18.3 (64.9)	22.9 (73.2)	29.6 (85.3)	31.2 (88.2)	35.1 (95.2)	35.8 (96.4)	38.6 (101.5)	38.9 (102.0)	35.5 (95.9)	31.5 (88.7)	28.0 (82.4)	23.0 (73.4)	38.9 (102.0)
Mean daily maximum °C (°F)	4.8 (40.6)	7.5 (45.5)	13.0 (55.4)	19.7 (67.5)	25.0 (77.0)	28.4 (83.1)	30.6 (87.1)	31.3 (88.3)	27.4 (81.3)	21.7 (71.1)	14.4 (57.9)	7.1 (44.8)	19.2 (66.6)
Daily mean °C (°F)	0.0 (32.0)	2.0 (35.6)	6.8 (44.2)	12.9 (55.2)	18.5 (65.3)	22.8 (73.0)	26.2 (79.2)	26.5 (79.7)	21.9 (71.4)	15.4 (59.7)	8.8 (47.8)	2.2 (36.0)	13.7 (56.7)
Mean daily minimum °C (°F)	−4.3 (24.3)	−2.8 (27.0)	1.4 (34.5)	6.9 (44.4)	12.7 (54.9)	18.2 (64.8)	22.7 (72.9)	22.9 (73.2)	17.4 (63.3)	10.1 (50.2)	3.9 (39.0)	−2.1 (28.2)	8.9 (48.0)
Record low °C (°F)	−17.1 (1.2)	−16.6 (2.1)	−12.2 (10.0)	−3.9 (25.0)	2.2 (36.0)	8.2 (46.8)	12.1 (53.8)	12.5 (54.5)	4.0 (39.2)	−2.7 (27.1)	−8.4 (16.9)	−15.0 (5.0)	−17.1 (1.2)
Average precipitation mm (inches)	26.9 (1.06)	36.8 (1.45)	53.7 (2.11)	78.4 (3.09)	82.8 (3.26)	159.0 (6.26)	302.8 (11.92)	289.6 (11.40)	128.2 (5.05)	57.3 (2.26)	49.8 (1.96)	34.0 (1.34)	1,299.3 (51.15)
Average precipitation days (≥ 0.1 mm)	8.3	6.9	9.4	8.7	8.9	10.3	16.0	15.0	9.3	6.6	8.9	9.0	117.3
Average snowy days	8.3	5.0	2.3	0.2	0.0	0.0	0.0	0.0	0.0	0.0	1.4	7.2	24.4
Average relative humidity (%)	66.8	63.5	60.9	59.1	63.2	70.6	77.5	76.9	73.4	69.4	67.4	67.6	68.0
Mean monthly sunshine hours	151.2	162.3	191.7	209.7	220.5	168.1	133.1	153.1	169.6	198.7	158.1	142.9	2,059
Percentage possible sunshine	48.7	51.3	50.1	53.9	50.0	39.6	30.8	38.4	45.1	55.6	50.0	47.0	46.2
Source: Korea Meteorological Administration (percent sunshine 1981–2010)

=== Demographics ===
Historical population
Year	Pop.	±%
1950	83,000	—
1955	123,000	+48.2%
1960	182,000	+48.0%
1965	213,000	+17.0%
1970	255,000	+19.7%
1975	308,000	+20.8%
1980	363,000	+17.9%
1985	431,000	+18.7%
1990	511,000	+18.6%
1995	561,000	+9.8%
2000	612,000	+9.1%
2005	623,000	+1.8%
2010	648,000	+4.0%
2015	658,000	+1.5%
2020	663,000	+0.8%

== History ==
=== Samguk (1C BC–7C AD) ===
The Baekje kingdom was located in southwestern Korea which included the area Jeonju is now located. It is believed that Jeonju was founded as a market town within Baekje around 57 BC.

Jeonju (along with Baekje in general) was conquered by the kingdom of Silla in 660 AD. It soon became part of the Silla kingdom and in 685, Jeonju became one of the nine chu (a provincial capital of the kingdom). From 889 and onward, peasant revolts (caused from over taxation) became widespread throughout the kingdom and it also spread to Jeonju where it became the headquarters of one of the most powerful rebel leaders of the time, Gyeon Hwon. In 892 (or 900), Gyeon Hwon renamed the city Wansan and established it as the capital of the Later Baekje kingdom. From Wansan, Gyeon Hwon campaigned against Silla which climaxed with the destruction of Geumseong (the capital of the Silla kingdom) and the assassination of King Gyeongae in 927. With the decline of Silla, Gyeon Hwon and Wang Geon (of the Goryeo kingdom) waged battle for control of the peninsula. However, Wang Geon and his forces invaded Later Baekje in 934 and Jeonju surrendered to him in 935.

=== Goryeo (918–1392) ===
Under Goryeo rule, Jeonju reverted to being a provincial capital and enjoyed relative stability and economic growth. However, in 1182, the city was taken by peasant rebels with the aid of governmental troops stationed there who resented being forced to do heavy labor along slaves. The rebellion was soon suppressed forty days after it began.

=== Joseon (1392–1897) ===
The Joseon defeated Goryeo and founded a new dynasty in 1392 and took all their possessions including Jeonju. The Joseon considered Jeonju their ancestral home (an ancestor of Yi Seonggye of Joseon may have fled Jeonju after the 1182 peasant revolt). During the Joseon period, Jeonju became the capital of a reorganized Jeolla (one of the eight provinces of the Joseon). In 1413, Jeonju (along with three other cities) was given the honor of safekeeping copies of the Annals of the Joseon Dynasty which still survives extant in the former Confucian academy in Jeonju.

The town was occupied by the Donghak Peasant Revolution in 1894. Jeonju was occupied by the Japanese beginning from 1910 to 1945, and was renamed to Zenshū during the period. The ancient walls of the old city were destroyed by the Japanese authorities with the gate Pungnammun (풍남문) being the only remnant left today. Jeonju's population grew between 1925 and 1949 when it reached 100,000 inhabitants. Jeonju was given metropolitan status in 1935, and the city was founded in 1949. During the Division of Korea, Jeonju was not in the immediate frontline of the war but by the armistice signing in July 1953, Jeonju (along with many other cities) suffered bombardment and the loss of many male residents who fought during the war.

=== Today ===
Jeonju was given its modern boundaries and government system in 1963. It has since then industrialized rapidly. Since the Joseon dynasty period, it was a metropolis, but it did not experience industrialization in the 20th century compared to other parts of Korea. It does not have the industrial infrastructure, manufacturing, or heavy industries found in other major Korean cities. Today, traditional tourism and sightseeing is a major industry in the city.

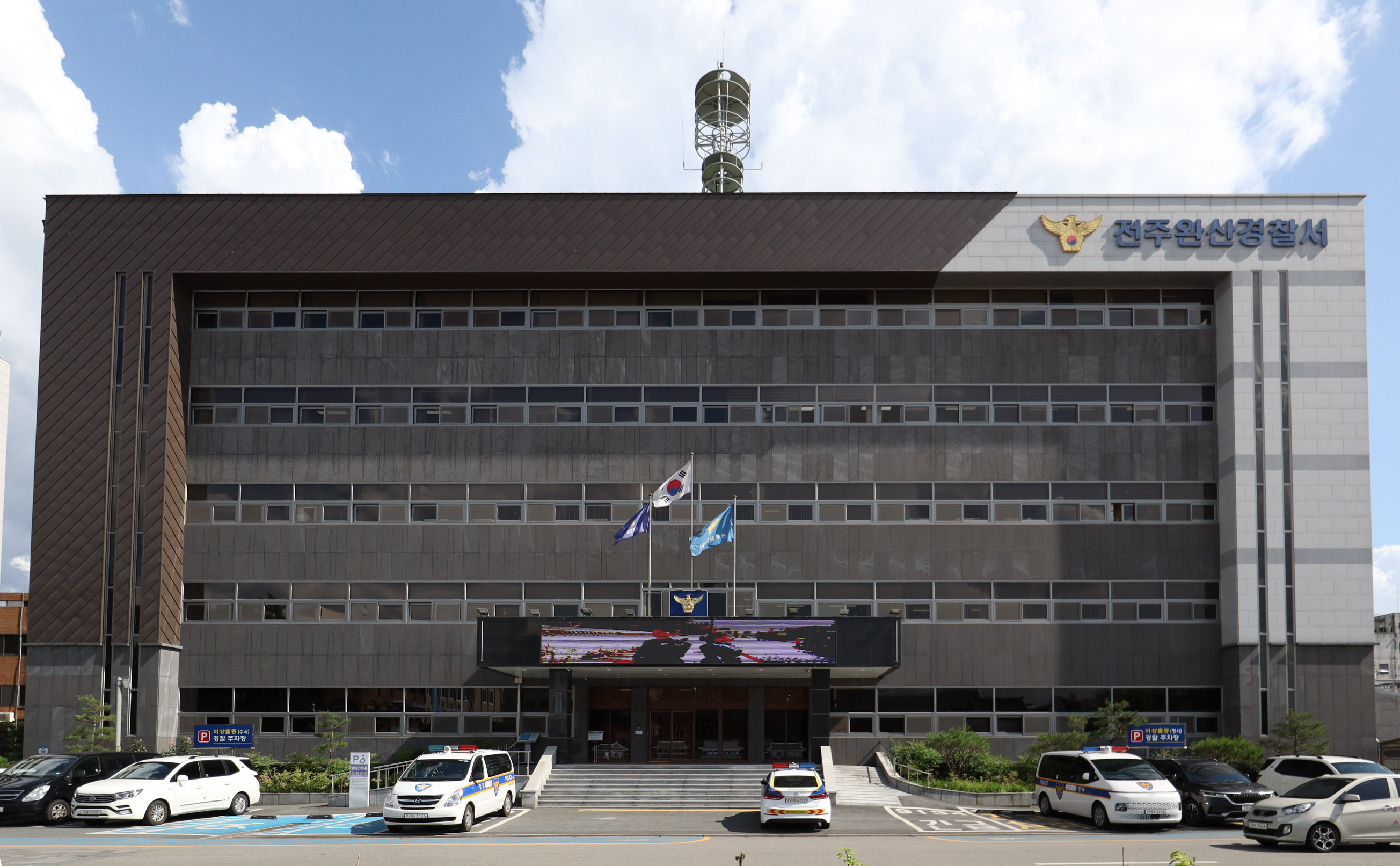
Jeonju Wansan Police Station

== Education ==
Jeonbuk National University and Jeonju National University of Education are the public universities in Jeonju.

=== Libraries ===
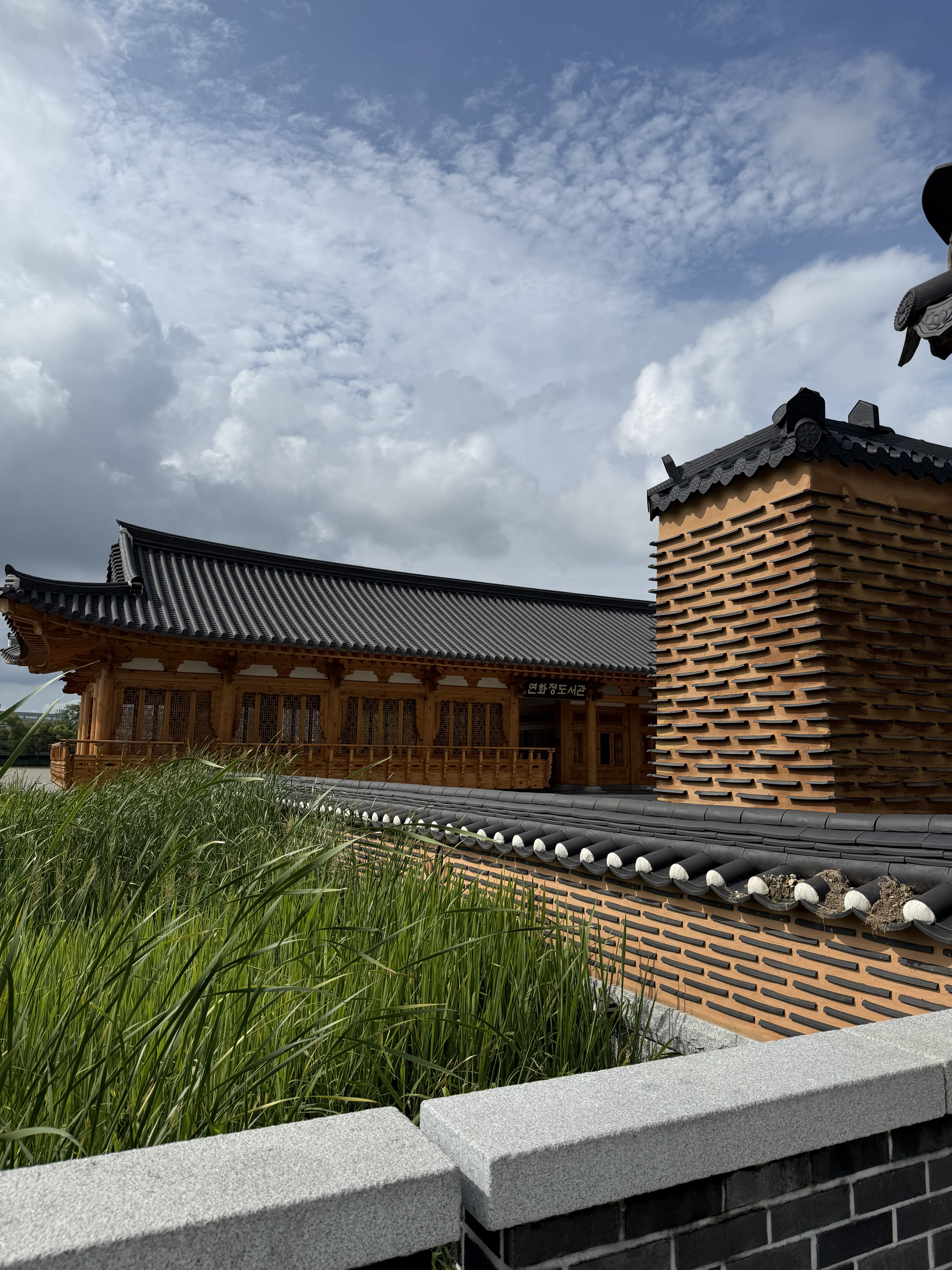
Yeonhwa-jeong Library in Jeonju

Libraries in Jeonju:

- Jeonju City Library
- Rainbow Small Library
- Gunji Library
- Geumam Library
- Sinseo-dong Library
- Peace City Library
- A-joong Library
- Ongdalsaem Small Library
- Hyoja Library
- Nosongjakeun Library
- Yeonhwa-jeong Library
- Samcheon Public Library

== Transportation ==
Many city buses and taxis are available in Jeonju. However, tourists are often advised to walk between points of interest, as many attractions are near each other.

=== Railways ===
- Jeonju Station

=== Buses ===
- Jeonbuk Shuttle Bus

== Culture ==
=== Cuisine ===
- Jeonju bibimbap (전주비빔밥), a traditional local food, is well known across South Korea. There are several very popular vegetarian restaurants serving Jeonju style food and pine wine.
- Kongnamul gukbap (콩나물국밥), a rice soup with bean sprouts, which is eaten a lot in winter
- Yukjeon (육전), a kind of pancake that is baked meat with dough
- Memil naengmyeon (메밀냉면)
Cuisine
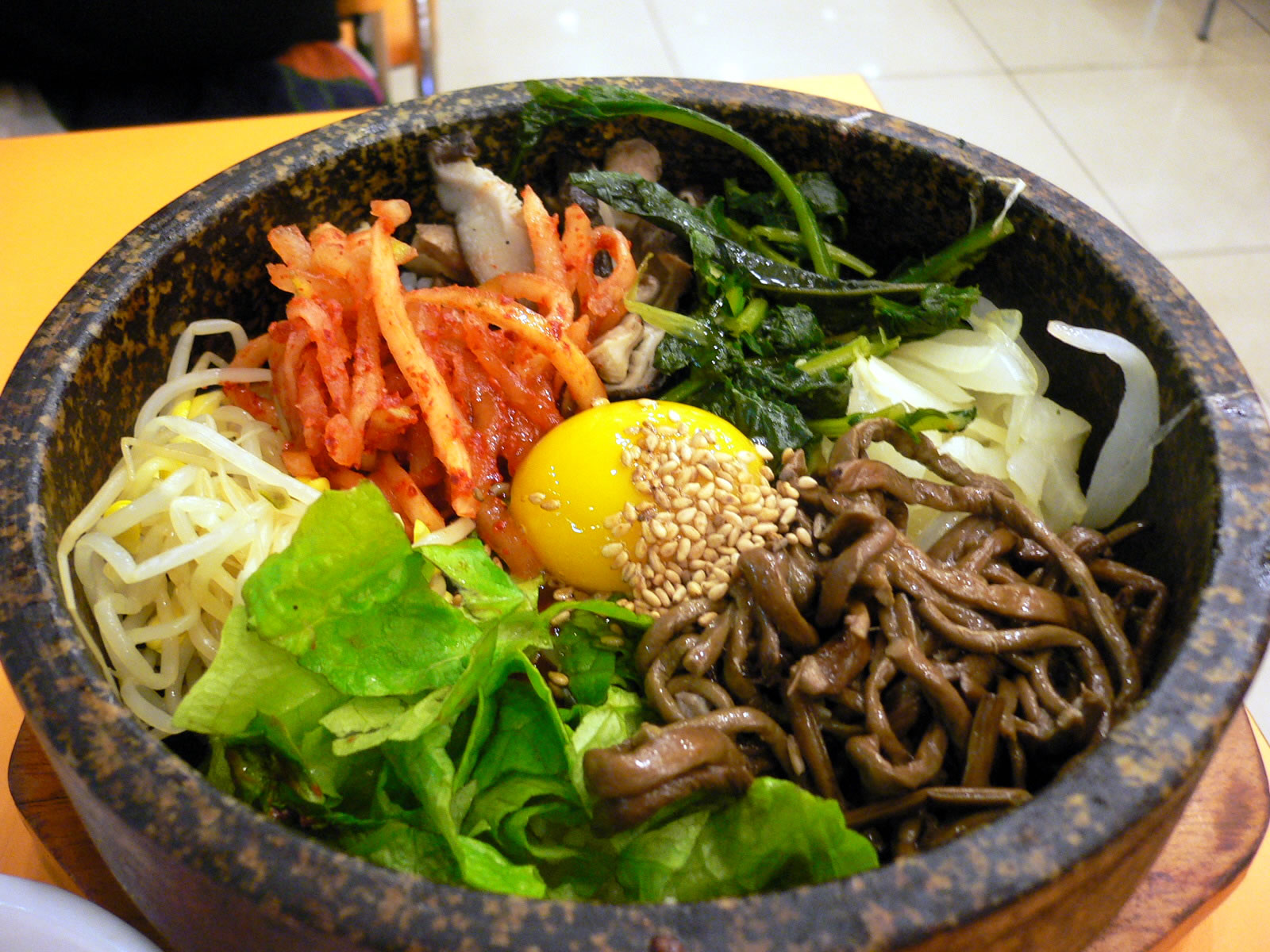
Bibimbap

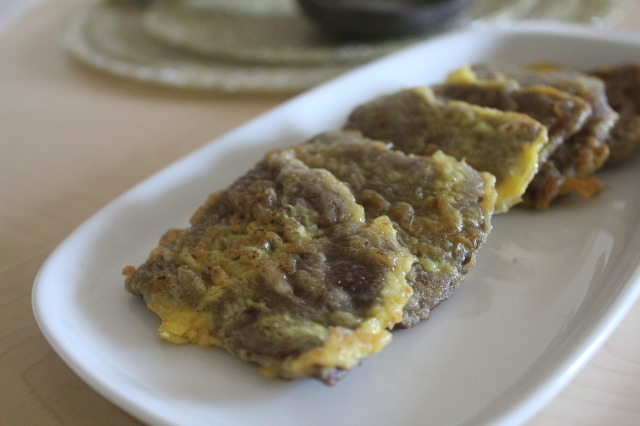
Yukjeon

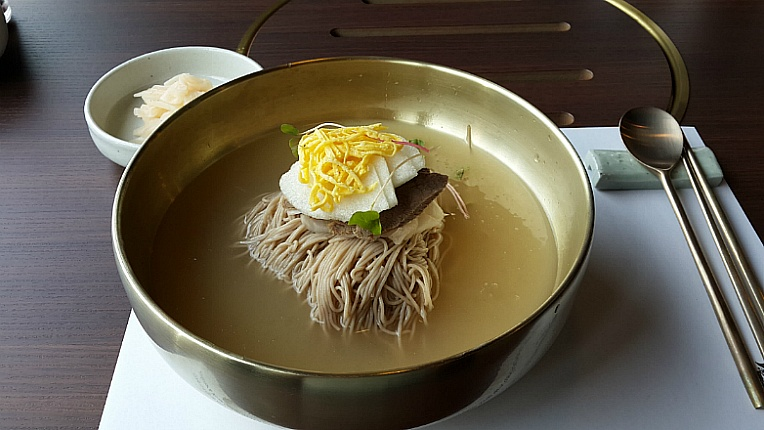
Naengmyun

=== Attractions ===
- Jeonju International Film Festival usually runs from the end of April to May for one week annually.
- The National Jeonju Museum exhibits ancient relics from the Baekje days.
- There are extensive royal museums, temples, a castle fortress on a hillside, and a well-known paper museum, as well as an annual paper fashion show highlighting the latest styles and traditional Korean clothing made of paper.
- The Jeonju Hanok Village (Hanok Maeul) is a traditional-style village in the heart of Jeonju, housing over 800 traditional "hanok" style buildings. It contains many traditional tea shops, souvenir shops, and restaurants.
- Jeongdong Catholic Church was built on 1908–1914 by French priest Xavier Baudonet on the site of the Korean Catholic martyrs in 1791 and 1801. This Byzantine and Romanesque church has been designated historic site No. 288.
- The Jeonju International Sori Festival was among Songlines' 25 Best International Festivals in 2014.
- The Jeonju International Film Festival draws about 50,000 visitors annually.
- Jeonju is the hometown of the breakdancing crew Last for One, international Battle of the Year champions.
- Gyeonggijeon is a place to enshirine the portrait of Lee Seonggye, the first king of the Joseon dynasty.

The local mountains and parks are popular for outdoor recreation due to its rural location. There are historical sites in the area. The city has a zoo, a park, and the Hanguk Sound and Culture Hall, a large, modern concert complex on the Jeonbuk National University campus.

In recent years, Jeonju has become an attractive destination for filmmakers. The Jeonju Film Studio Complex was built in 2009, providing post-production, color grading and sound mastering services, but the city's hanok village is also a popular filming location. Some of the productions partially filmed in Jeonju include Bong Joon-ho's Parasite and the hit Netflix series When Life Gives You Tangerines.

Attractions in Jeonju

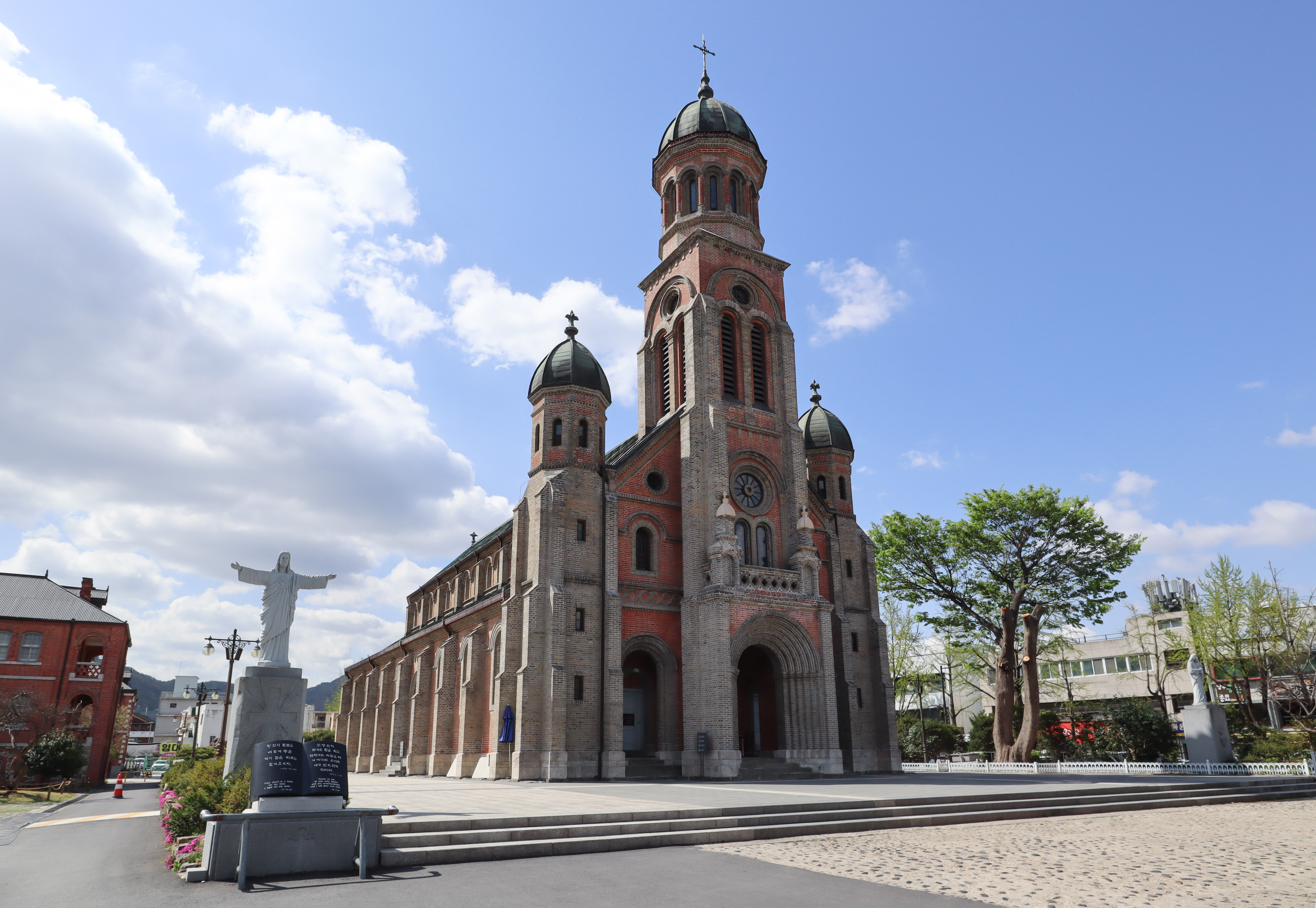
Jeondong Cathedral

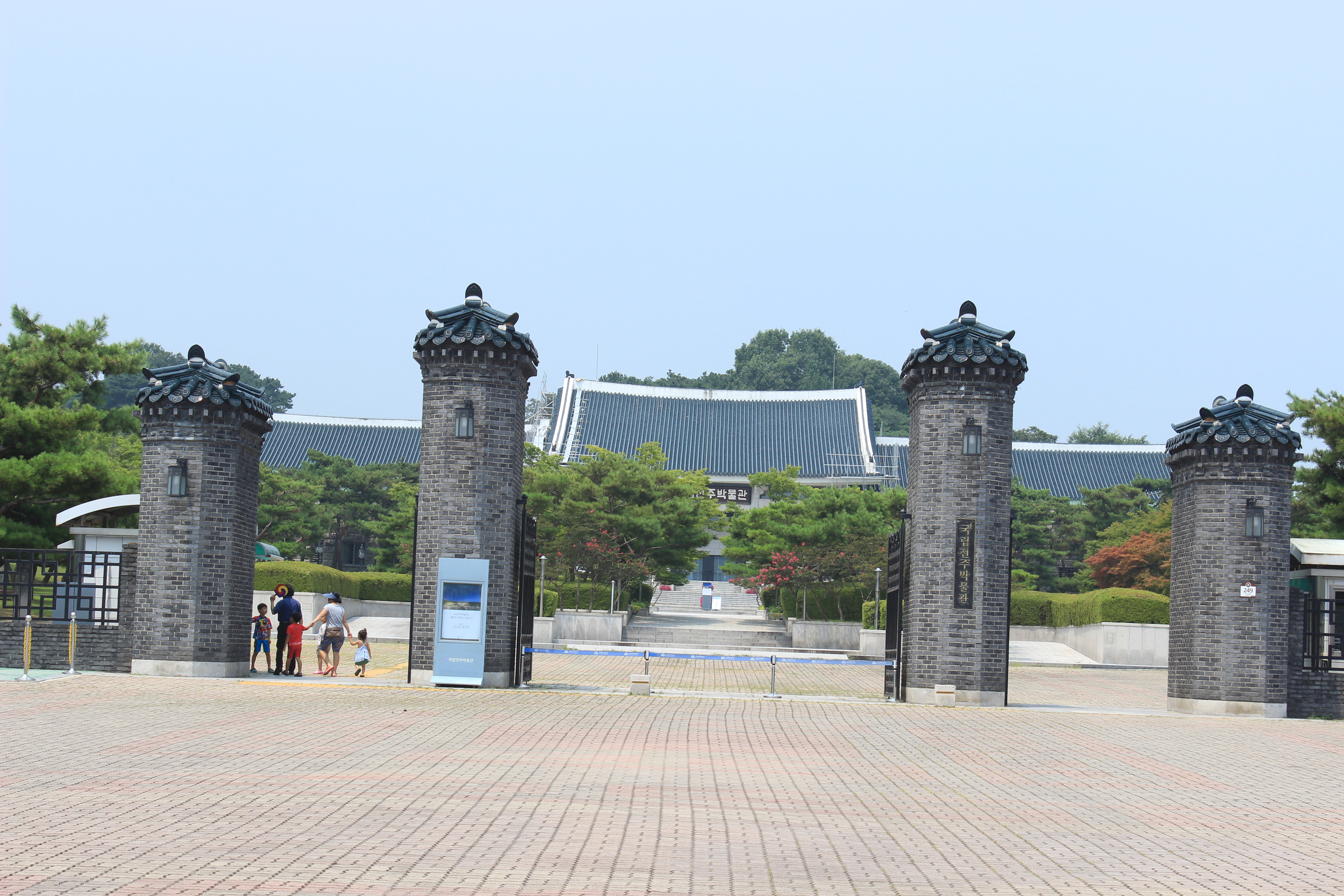
Jeonju National Museum

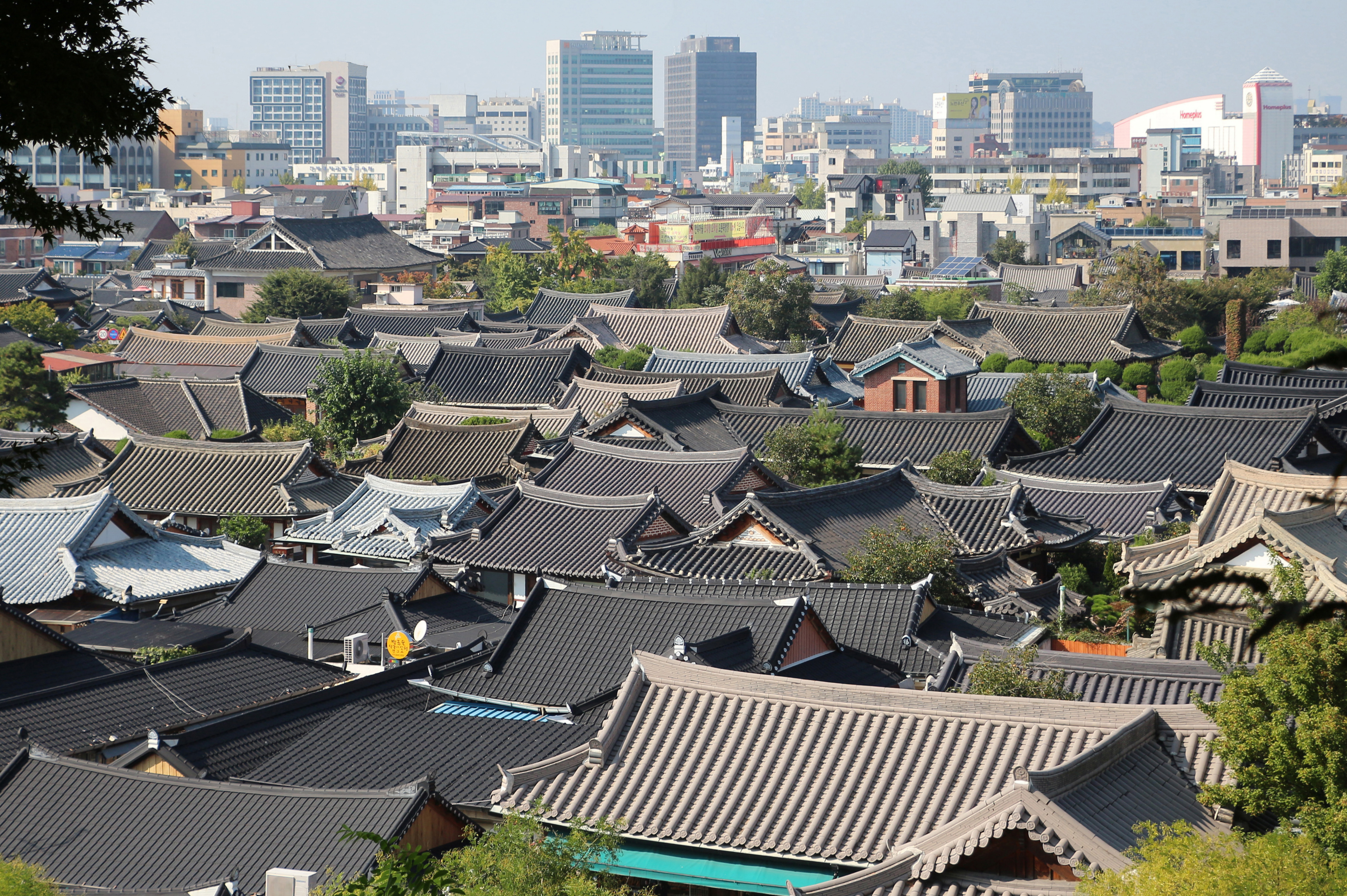
Jeonju Hanok Village

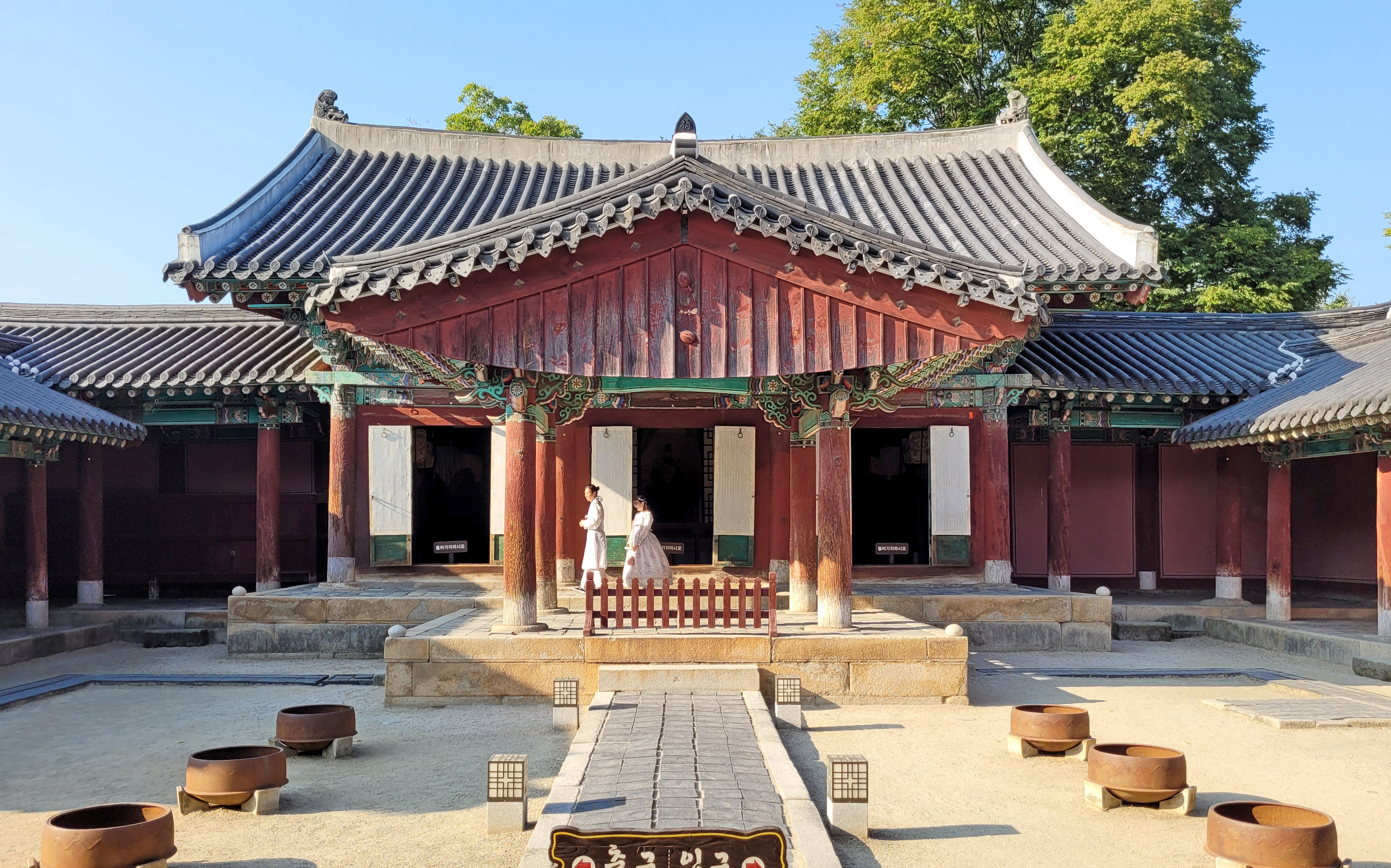
Gyeonggijeon Shrine

=== Sports ===
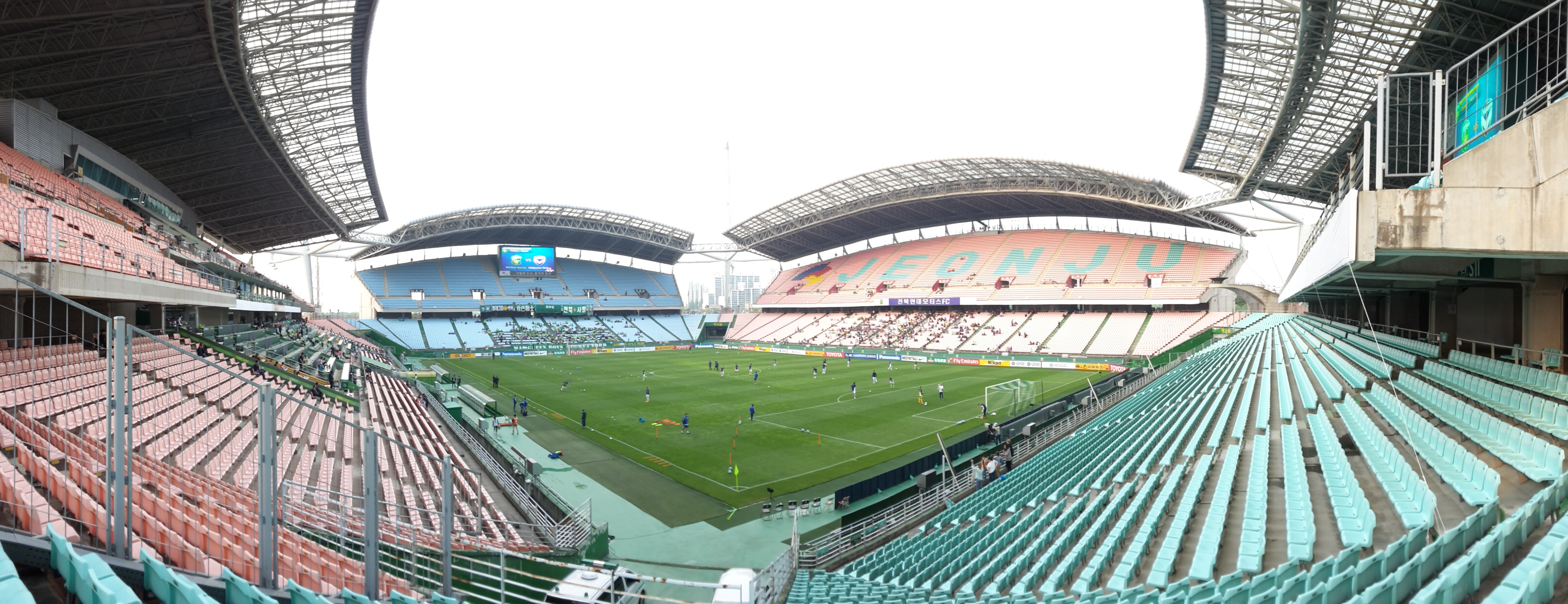
Jeonju World Cup Stadium

Jeonju hosts K League 1 team Jeonbuk Hyundai Motors. The team's home ground is the Jeonju World Cup Stadium. Jeonju also hosts a semi-professional football team, Jeonju Citizen, which plays in the K4 League. Their home ground is the Jeonju Sports Complex Stadium.

In addition, Jeonju was the home city of the Jeonju KCC Egis, a professional basketball team of the Korean Basketball League, between 2001 and 2023, when they relocated to Busan after the city of Jeonju postponed the construction of a new gymnasium.

== Notable people ==
=== Celebrities ===
- Taeyeon (born Kim Tae-yeon in 1989), singer and member of Girls' Generation
- Defconn (born Yoo Dae-joon in 1976), rapper and TV personality
- Bae Hyun-sung (born 1999), actor
- Lee Min-woo (born 1979), singer and member of Shinhwa
- Kim Kyu-jong (born 1987), singer and member of SS501
- Yoon Kyun-sang (born 1987), actor
- Kim Sung-kyu (born 1989), singer and member of Infinite
- Hwasa (born 1995), singer and member of Mamamoo
- Wheein (born 1995), singer and member of Mamamoo
- Choi Yu-jin (born 1996), singer and member of CLC and Kep1er
- Choi Byung-chan (born 1997), singer and member of Victon
- Bae In-hyuk, (born 1998), actor
- Na Jae-min (born 2000), singer and member of NCT
- Ryeoun (born Go Yun Hwan, in 1998), actor
- So Yi-hyun (born 1984), actress
- Lee Yoo-mi (born 1994), actress
- Yeji (born Hwang Ye-ji in 2000), singer and member of Itzy

=== Politician ===
- Han Duck-soo, former prime minister

=== Athletes ===
- Lee Chang-ho (born 1975), professional Go player
- Yang Hong-seok, (born 1997), basketball player
- Lee "Gumayusi" Min-hyeong, (born 2002), professional League of Legends player, AD Carry for Hanwha Life Esports

=== Other ===
- Faceless Angel of Jeonju, anonymous donor

== Sister cities ==
- San Diego, California, United States
- Suzhou, Jiangsu, China
- Huế, Vietnam
- Kanazawa, Ishikawa, Japan
- Edmonton, Alberta, Canada
- Antalya, Turkey
- Mokpo, South Korea
- Zugló, Hungary

== See also ==
- List of cities in South Korea
- Joseon dynasty
