= Hidiya Hanim Barakat =

Egyptian philanthropist and social worker

- Born: 1898
- Died: 1969 (aged 70–71)
- Known for: Egyptian welfare work

Hidiya Hanim Barakat (1898 – 1969) was an Egyptian philanthropist and social worker who worked to improve the welfare of Egyptian people.

== Early life ==
Hidiya Hanim Barakat was born in 1898 to a palace official. As a child, she attended school at the Nôtre Dame de la Mère de Dieu convent. When she was twenty, she married Bahieddine Barakat, a lawyer from a prominent political family. The Barakat family encouraged her interest in welfare issues, seeing her and her work as a venue through which they could distribute Wafdist materials.

== Work ==
With the help of Egyptian princess Ayn al-Hayat, Barakat formed a group of philanthropists. In 1908, the group opened a medical clinic in Cairo. In 1909, Barakat expanded the group to include other women, including Huda Sha'rawi, and renamed it to Mabarrat Muhammad Ali, later better known as the Mabarrat. The group continued to work to improve Egyptian welfare, later opening a hospital in the Abdin province of Cairo. Barakat served as the treasurer of the group, which continued their work to improve healthcare for people throughout Egypt, particularly focusing to improve the issues of infant mortality, epidemic response, and vaccination. She also worked to coordinate what became a group of clinics and mobile vaccination clinics.

In 1919, Barakat cofounded the Society of the New Woman to work on and sponsor not only welfare programs, but also programs for education, trade instruction, childcare, and orphanages.

By the 1950s, the Mabarrat had become the most wide-reaching organization within Egypt. In 1952, Barakat was elected the president of the group. In 1956, Barakat's youngest daughter followed her as president.

The Mabarrat was able to establish twelve hospitals in Egypt by 1961. By 1964, the government took over the management of these hospitals, as well as the control of the orphanages and clinics that the group had established.

== Legacy ==
After Barakat's death, President Anwar Sadat stated "We are all pupils of Hidiya Barakat." A number of Egyptian projects were named after her.
