= 2023 in Germany =

- Decades: 2000s; 2010s; 2020s; 2030s
- See also: Other events of 2023; History of Germany • Timeline • Years

The following is a list of events from the year 2023 in Germany.

== Incumbents ==
- President: Frank-Walter Steinmeier
- Chancellor: Olaf Scholz

== Events ==
=== January ===
- 5 January – The United States and Germany agree to send Bradley Fighting Vehicles and Marder infantry fighting vehicles to Ukraine. Germany will also supply the Ukrainian military with a MIM-104 Patriot surface-to-air missile system.
- 8 January – North Rhine-Westphalia Police arrest two Iranian brothers in Castrop-Rauxel, Ruhr, North Rhine-Westphalia, on the suspicion of planning an Islamic terrorist attack using chemical weapons.
- 16 January – German Defence Minister Christine Lambrecht resigns from the Scholz cabinet amid criticism over her handling of the Russian invasion of Ukraine.
- 22 January – German Foreign Affairs Minister Annalena Baerbock says that Germany will not prevent Poland from sending Leopard 2 main battle tanks to Ukraine which Ukrainian officials say are pivotal to defeating Russian forces on the battlefield.
- 24 January – German Chancellor Olaf Scholz decides to send Leopard 2 main battle tanks to Ukraine, and will allow other operators of the tanks, such as Poland, to do so as well.
- 25 January – Two people are killed and seven others are wounded in a mass stabbing on a passenger train in Brokstedt, Steinburg, Schleswig-Holstein.

=== February ===
- 10 February – At least 35 people are injured when a bus overturns near Magdeburg, Saxony-Anhalt.
- 12 February – 2023 Berlin repeat state election
- 22 February – Germany expels two employees of the Iranian embassy in response to Iran sentencing pro-monarchist dual German-Iranian Jamshid Sharmahd to death over a 2008 bombing in Iran.

=== March ===
- 9 March – A mass shooting in Hamburg kills six people and injures eight others. The gunman then commits suicide.
- 9–11 March – Last meeting of Synodal Path in Frankfurt am Main

=== April ===
- 3 April – Four people are injured in a fire at a hospital in Berlin. One person has been arrested on suspicion of arson.
- 11 April – Germany expels the ambassador of Chad in a tit-for-tat decision following the expulsion of the German ambassador from Chad last week.
- 15 April – The Nuclear power in Germany ends. The last three power plants Isar Nuclear Power Plant, Neckarwestheim Nuclear Power Plant and Emsland Nuclear Power Plant in Germany stop.
- 18 April – At least four people are severely injured in a stabbing attack at a gym in Duisburg.
- 26 April – the Federal Office for the Protection of the Constitution BfV, after four years of investigations into the youth wing of the Alternative for Germany AfD party, categorized that group as a "confirmed" extremist organization. This allowed the chief of the BfV Thomas Haldenwang to place the youth wing of the AfD under even more intensive surveillance than the tapping of phone and the use of undercover agents than had been the case until then.

=== May ===
- 11 May
  - 2023 Mercedes-Benz factory shooting: Two people are killed in a shooting at a Mercedes-Benz factory in Sindelfingen, Baden-Württemberg. The perpetrator, a 53 year old Turkish citizen, is arrested.
  - Twelve people are wounded in an explosion at an apartment complex in Ratingen, North Rhine-Westphalia. A 57-year-old man is arrested.
- 14 May – The SPD wins the 2023 Bremen state election with 29.8% of the vote.
- 25 May – The German economy enters recession for the first time since the COVID-19 pandemic amid high levels of inflation.
- 31 May – Trial of Lina E.: a Dresden court convicts 4 far-left extremists of violent attacks against far-right individuals.

=== June ===
- 3 June – The National Democratic Party of Germany (NDP) renames itself to Die Heimat ("The Homeland") at the party congress in Riesa. 77% voted in favor of the name change.
- 5 June – Björn Höcke, Leader of Alternative for Germany in Thuringia is charged for using Nazi slogan Everything for Germany.
- 25 June – The Alternative for Germany wins its first district election in Sonneberg, Thuringia despite all other parties supporting the CDU Candidate.

=== July ===
- 2 July – in a run-off election the AfD candidate Hannes Loth won against the independent Nils Naumann in Raguhn-Jeßnitz Saxony-Anhalt, becoming the first ever AfD mayor.
- 24 July – CDU leader Friedrich Merz shows some willingness to work with the Alternative for Germany (AfD) party at the local level, which was interpreted as the erosion of the 'firewall' separating conservatives from the far-right, sparking intense backlash within his own party, notably from Kai Wegner, the current Governing Mayor of Berlin.

=== August ===
- 19 August – Killing of Michael Ovsjannikov in Wittlich, Rhineland-Palatinate by U.S. airmen stationed at Spangdahlem Air Base.
- 21 August – Germany's central bank announces the country's economy will be stagnant in the third quarter, due to high energy prices and rising borrowing costs.
- 23 August – Germany passes legislation to ease citizenship rules, aiming to reduce a shortage of skilled workers and to improve the integration of immigrants.
- 24 August – A German federal court rejects an appeal by a military officer who posed as a asylum-seeker and was convicted of plotting to attack prominent politicians.

=== October ===
- 8 October
  - The CSU wins the 2023 Bavarian state election with 37% of the vote, with the Free Voters taking second at 15.8%, their best result ever.
  - 2023 Hessian state election
- 13 October – Mühldorf van crash: Seven people are killed and 16 others injured when a severely overloaded vehicle carrying illegal immigrants from the Middle East crashes in Mühldorf, Bavaria.
- 16 October – German Chancellor Olaf Scholz announces he will visit Israel on Tuesday and then Egypt. The German Chancellor said on Monday that the visit allows him to "express his solidarity" with Israel.
- 18 October – Extremists throw Molotov cocktails at a synagogue in Berlin, Germany. Several antisemitic incidents in the country have been rising following the escalation in the Gaza war. The incident is being investigated as a terrorist attack.
- 24 October – 2023 North Sea incident: Two cargo ships, the British-flagged Verity and the Bahamas-flagged Polesie, collide in the North Sea near the Heligoland islands, with several individuals missing and the suspected sinking of the Verity. Rescue efforts are underway.
- 30 October – AfD politician Daniel Halemba is arrested after Nazi salute complaints and possession of banned totalitarian symbols.

=== November ===
- 5 November – 2023 Hamburg Airport hostage incident: A hostage crisis caused by "family drama" halts flights at Hamburg Airport.
- 27 November – German Catholic priest Hans-Joachim Lohre, who disappeared in Bamako, Mali, in November 2022 and was presumed kidnapped, is released by his captors and returns to Germany.

=== December ===
- 17 December – The AfD candidate for mayor of Pirna, Saxony wins, becoming the first mayor of a city with more than 20,000 inhabitants to be held by the Alternative for Germany.
- December – The Cologne Cathedral bomb plot, an apparent Islamist plot to bomb Cologne Cathedral, was discovered.

== Sports ==
- 10 September – Germany wins its first FIBA Basketball World Cup, beating Serbia 83–77 in the final. Dennis Schröder is named the tournament's Most Valuable Player.

== Deaths ==
=== January ===
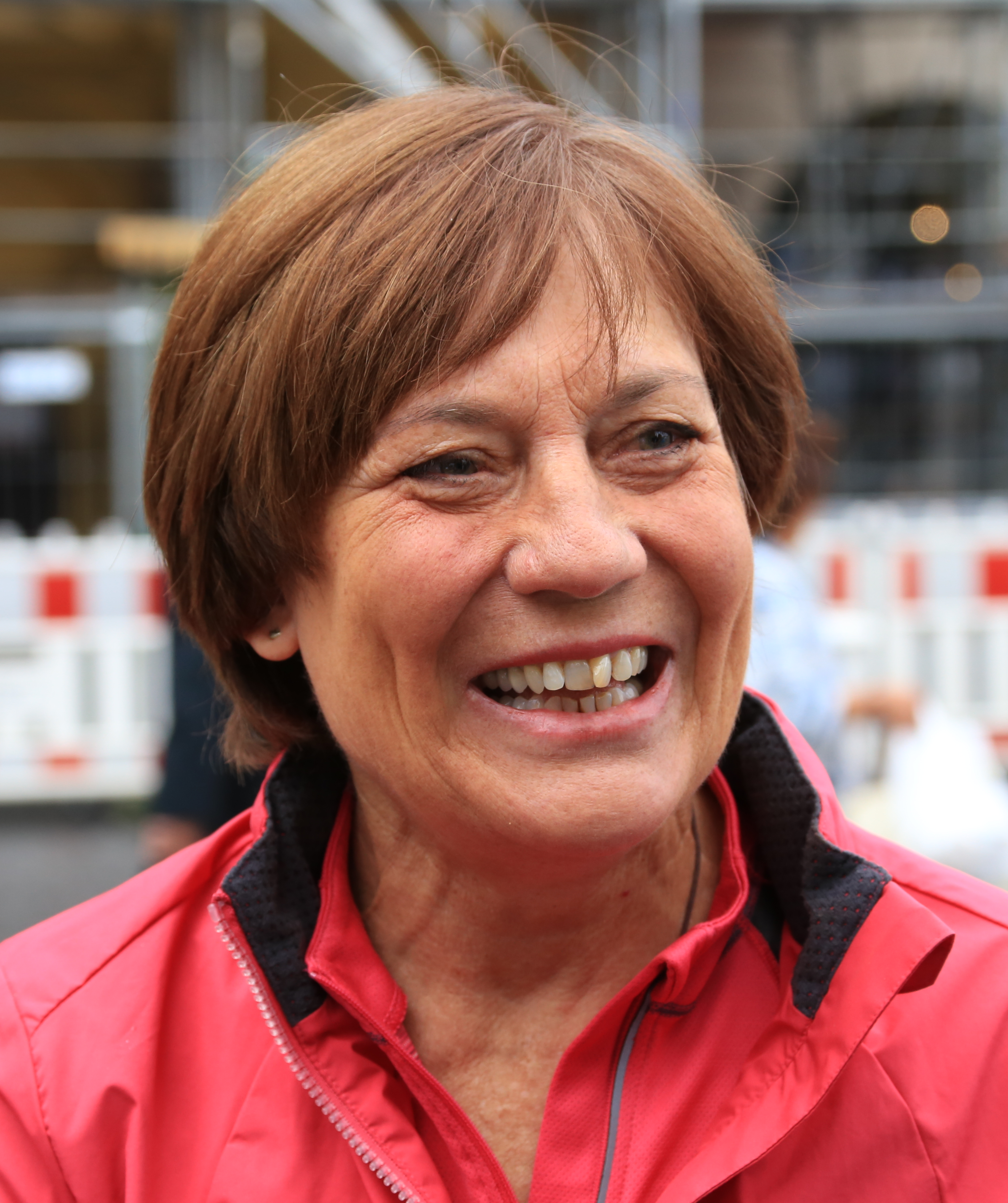
Rosi Mittermaier

- 1 January – Bob Jongen, 95, German-born Dutch footballer. (b. 1927)
- 2 January – Kurt Horres, 90, theatre director. (b. 1932)
- 3 January – Norbert Werbs, 82, Roman Catholic prelate and theologian, auxiliary bishop of Schwerin (1981–1994) and Hamburg (1994–2015). (b. 1940)
- 4 January
  - Rosi Mittermaier, 72, ski racer (b. 1950)
  - Hans Rebele, 79, footballer (1860 Munich, West Germany national team).
- 5 January
  - Ruth Adler Schnee, 99, German-born American textile and interior designer.
  - Renate Boy, 83, shot putter, Olympic silver medallist (1964).
- 6 January – Axel Troost, 68, politician, MP (2005–2017, 2021).
- 8 January – Siegfried Kurz, 92, conductor and composer.
- 9 January
  - Rainer Ulrich, 73, footballer (Karlsruher SC) and coach (SSV Ulm, VfR Mannheim).
  - Thomas Kretschmer, 68, politician, member of the Landtag of Thuringia (1990–2008).
  - Hermann-Josef Blanke, 65, academic and legal scholar.
- 10 January
  - Lothar Blumhagen, 95, film and voice actor.
  - Hans Belting, 87, art historian.
- 11 January
  - Tatjana Patitz, 56, model and actress.
  - Günther Deschner, 81, author and historian.
- 14 January
  - Matthias Carras, 58, pop singer.
  - Carl Hahn, 96, automotive industry executive, chairman of Volkswagen Group (1982–1993).
  - Hermann A. Schlögl, 85, actor and Egyptologist.
- 17 January – Heinz-Dieter Hasebrink, 81, footballer (Rot-Weiss Essen, 1. FC Kaiserslautern, Werder Bremen).
- 18 January – Clytus Gottwald, 97, composer, conductor and musicologist.
- 20 January – Hans Kasper, 84, politician, member of the Landtag of Saarland (1970–1999).
- 22 January – Bernd Uhl, 76, Roman Catholic prelate, auxiliary bishop of Freiburg (2001–2018).
- 23 January – Inge Kaul, 78, economist.
- 25 January – Wolfgang Altenburg, 94, general, inspector general of the Bundeswehr (1983–1986) and chairman of the NATO Military Committee (1986–1989).
- 26 January – Sepp Dürr, 69, politician, member of the Landtag of Bavaria (1998–2018).
- 27 January – Hellmut Mehnert, 94, internist and diabetologist.
- 29 January
  - Gerhard Moehring, 101, teacher and local historian.
  - Gero Storjohann, 64, politician.
  - Gerhard Woitzik, 95, politician.
- 30 January – Gerald Mortag, 64, cyclist, Olympic silver medallist (1980).

=== February ===
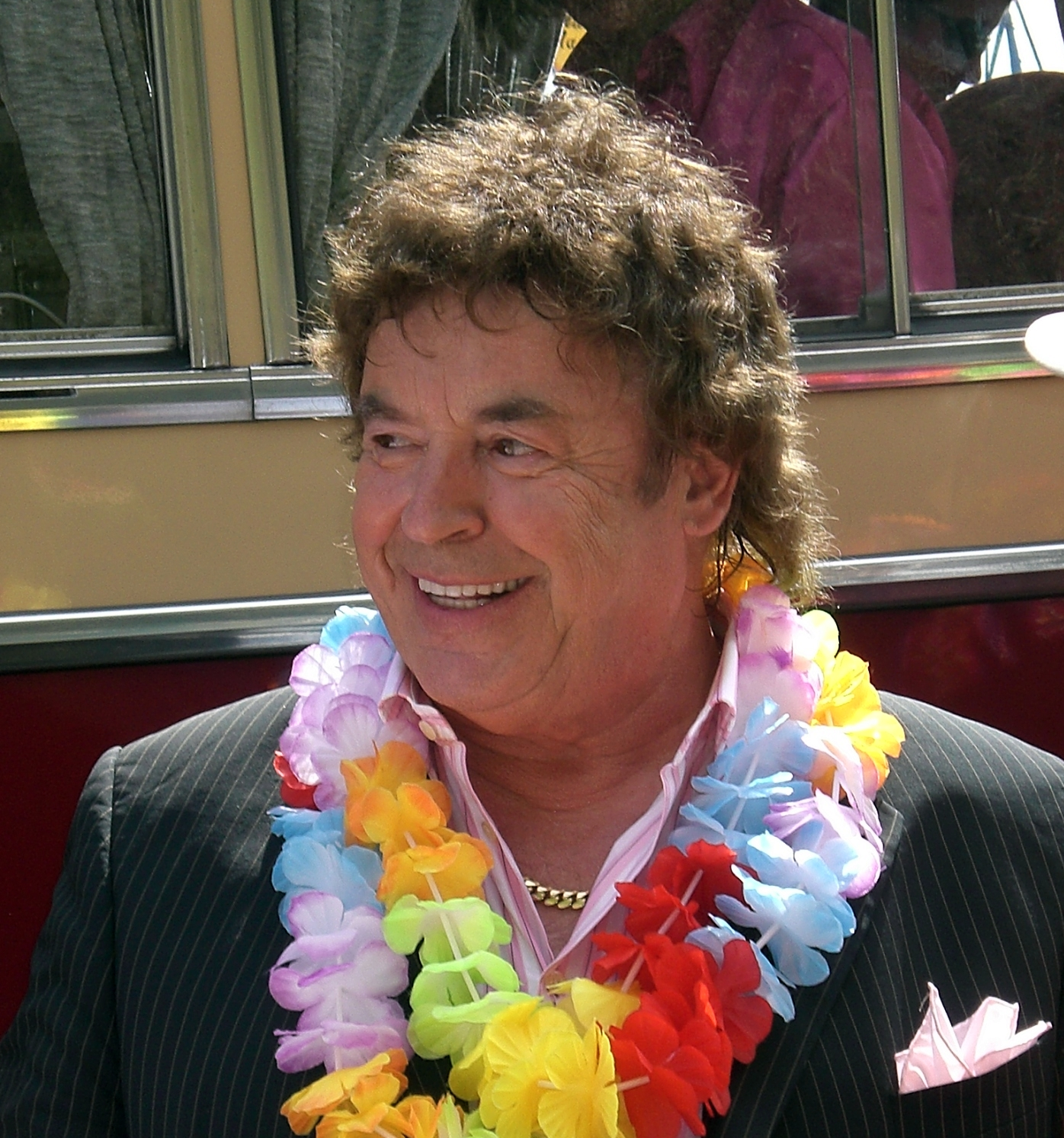
Tony Marshall

- 2 February
  - Solomon Perel, 97, German-born Israeli author and motivational speaker (Europa Europa).
  - Caspar Richter, 78, conductor (Vereinigte Bühnen Wien).
- 3 February
  - Andreas Gielchen, 58, footballer (1. FC Köln, Alemannia Aachen).
  - Ismail Tipi, 64, Turkish-German politician, member of the Landtag of Hesse (since 2010).
- 4 February – Jürgen Flimm, 81, theater director and manager (Salzburg Festival, Berlin State Opera).
- 7 February – Volkmar Sigusch, 82, sociologist, physician and sexologist
- 10 February – Hans Modrow, 95, politician
- 16 February
  - Tim Lobinger, 50, pole vaulter
  - Tony Marshall, 85, singer
  - Gunnar Heinsohn, 79, author, sociologist and economist
- 25 February – Corinna Miazga, 39, politician
- 26 February – Günther von Lojewski, 87, journalist

=== March ===
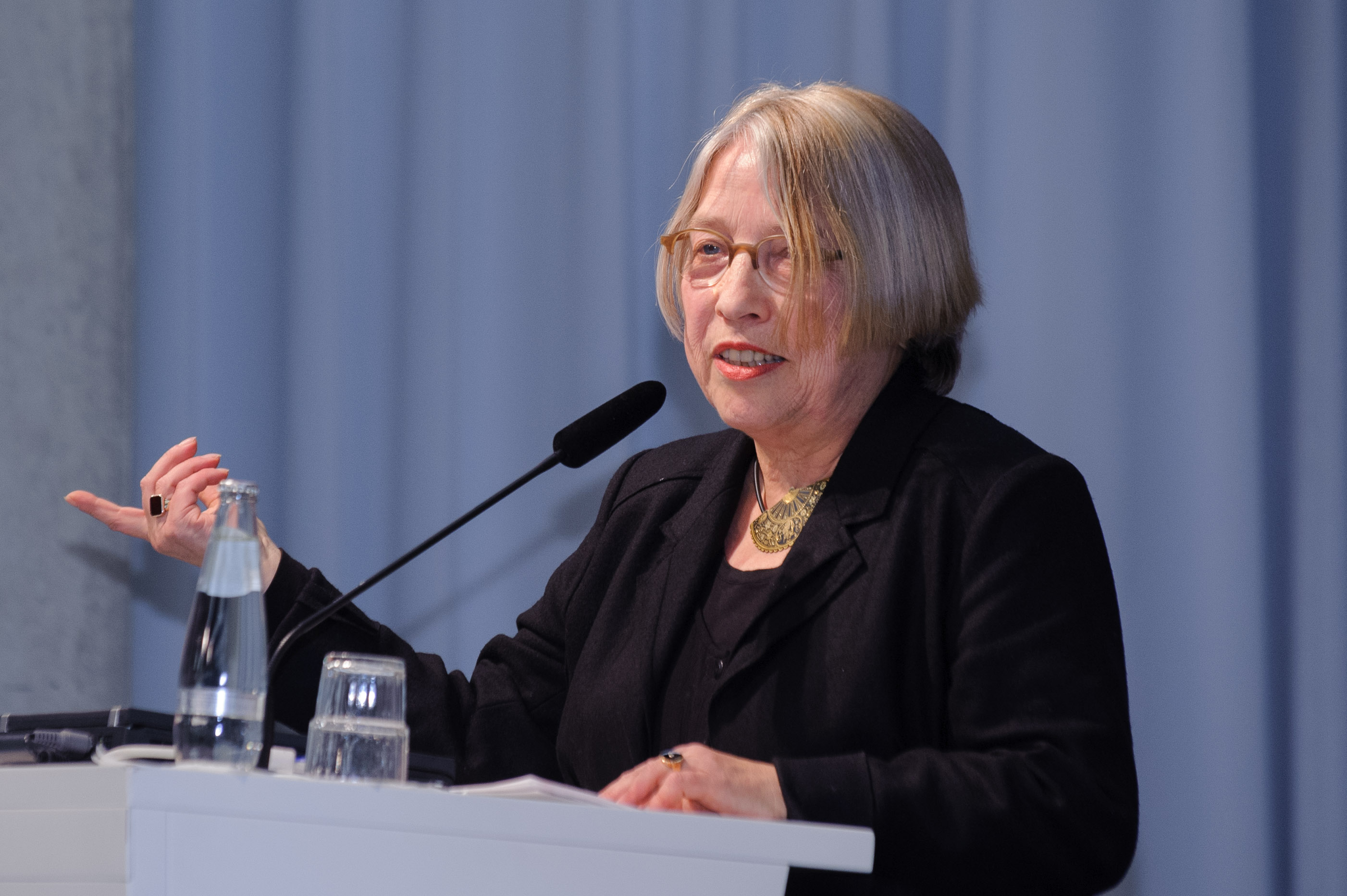
Antje Vollmer

- 2 March – Mary Bauermeister, 89, artist
- 4 March – Heinz Baumann, 95, actor
- 5 March – Klaus-Michael Bonsack, 79, luger
- 6 March
  - Traute Lafrenz, 103, resistance fighter
  - Heinz Schwarz, 94, politician
- 14 March – Richard Wagner, 70, novelist
- 15 March – Antje Vollmer, 79, politician
- 17 March – Tilman Zülch, 83, human rights activist

=== April ===
- 1 April – Klaus Teuber, 70, game board designer
- 4 April – Maria Sebaldt, 92, actress
- 11 April – Lotti Krekel, 81, actress and singer
- 28 April – Peter Lilienthal, 95, film director (b. 1927)

=== May ===
- 9 May – Günter Wewel, 85, television presenter (b. 1934)
- 28 May – Harald zur Hausen, 87, virologist (b. 1936)

=== June ===
- 1 June – Margit Carstensen, 83, film and theatre actress (b. 1940)
- 20 June – Doris Stockhausen, 79, music pedagogue (b. 1924)
- 22 June – Peter Brötzmann, 82, jazz saxophonist and clarinetist (b. 1941)

=== July ===
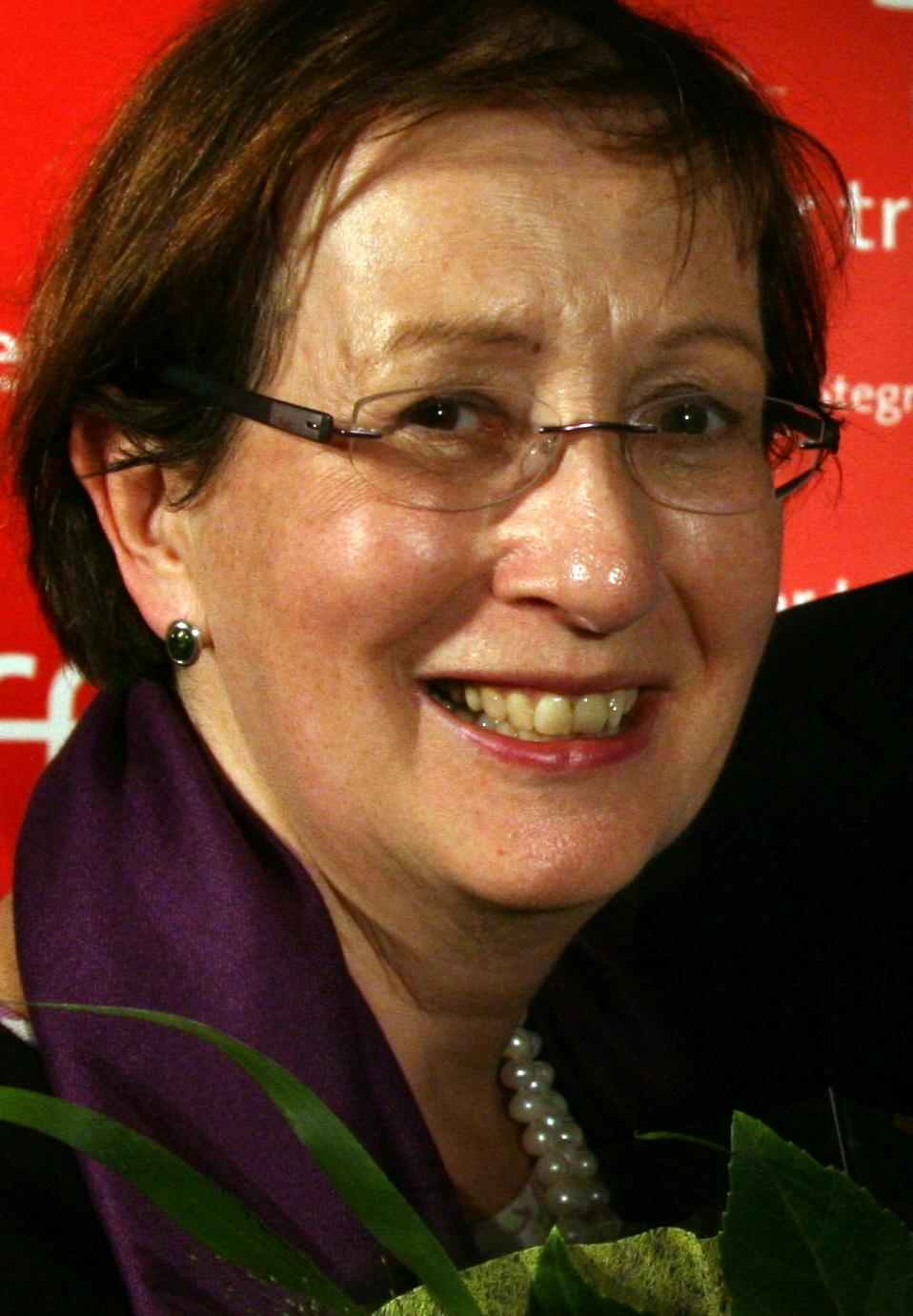
Heide Simonis

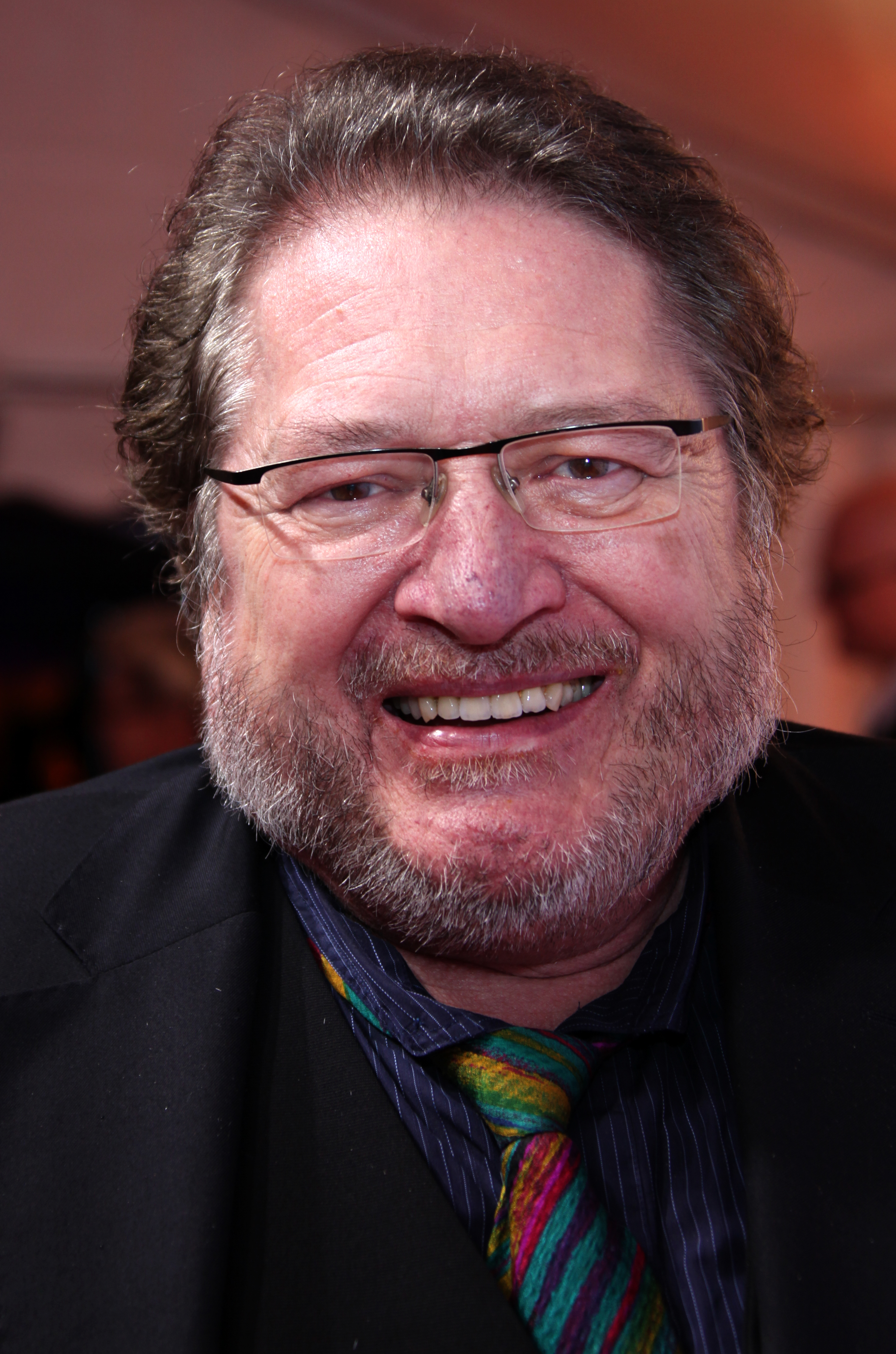
Christian Quadflieg

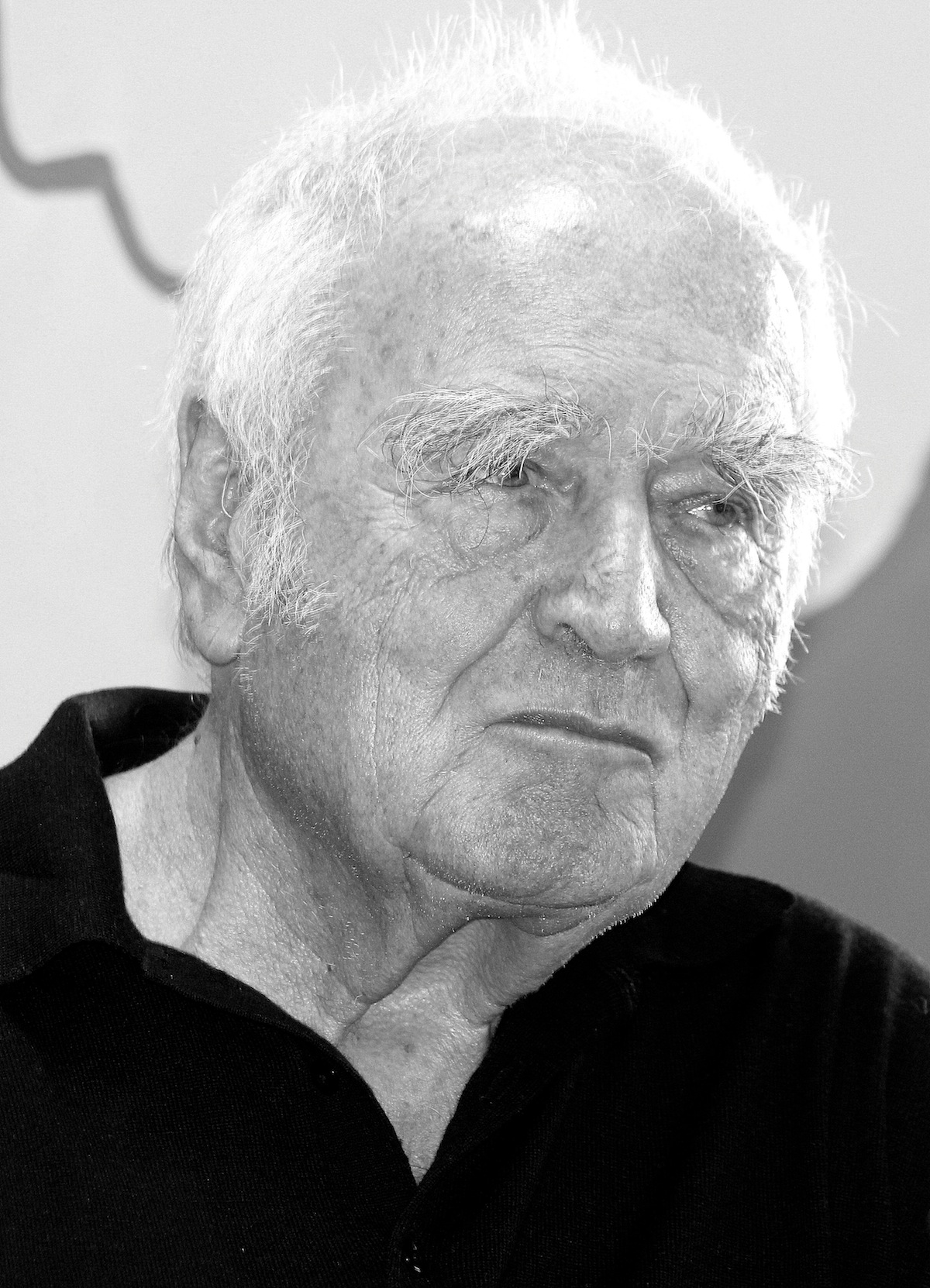
Martin Walser

- 1 July – Klaus Täuber, 65, football player (b. 1958)
- 2 July – Randolf Stich, 57, politician (b. 1966)
- 8 July – Eva Schreiber, 65, politician (b. 1958)
- 11 July – Richard von Schirach, 81, sinologist and author (b. 1942)
- 12 July – Heide Simonis, 80, politician (b. 1943)
- 16 July – Christian Quadflieg, 78, actor (b. 1945)
- 17 July – Bruno Flierl, 96, architect (b. 1927)
- 19 July – Matthias Zimmer, 62, politician (b. 1961)
- 28 July – Martin Walser, writer and novelist (b. 1927)

=== August ===
- 1 August – Heinz Golombeck, 74, politician (b. 1948)
- 7 August – Margit Saad, 94, actress (b. 1929)
- 14 August – Wolfram Setz, 82, historian, editor and translator (b. 1941)
- 16 August – Jürgen Kluckert, 79, actor (b. 1943)
- 22 August
  - René Weller, 69, boxer (b. 1953)
  - Manfred Zetzsche, 93, actor (b. 1930)
- 23 August – Ingrid Olef, 83, politician (b. 1939)
- 25 August – Claus Boje, 65, film producer (b. 1958)
- 27 August – Dennis Kramer, 31, cyclist (b. 1992)

=== September ===
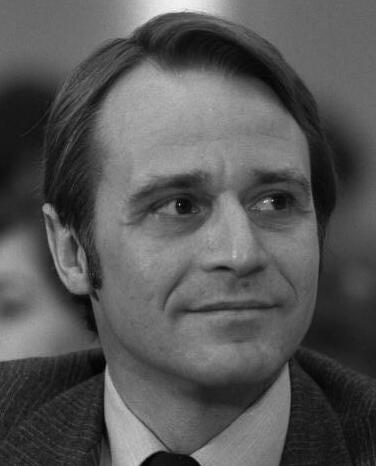
Hans-Ulrich Klose

- 4 September – Filip Minarik, 48, Czech jockey (b. 1975)
- 5 September
  - Jürgen Claus, 88, painter (b. 1935)
  - Corinna Werwigk-Hertneck, 70, politician (b. 1965)
- 6 September
  - Hans-Ulrich Klose, 86, politician (b. 1937)
  - Lothar Koch, 83, politician (b. 1939)
- 7 September – Edgar Moron, 82, politician (b. 1941)
- 20 September – Ruth Fuchs, 76, politician and athlete (b. 1946)

=== October ===
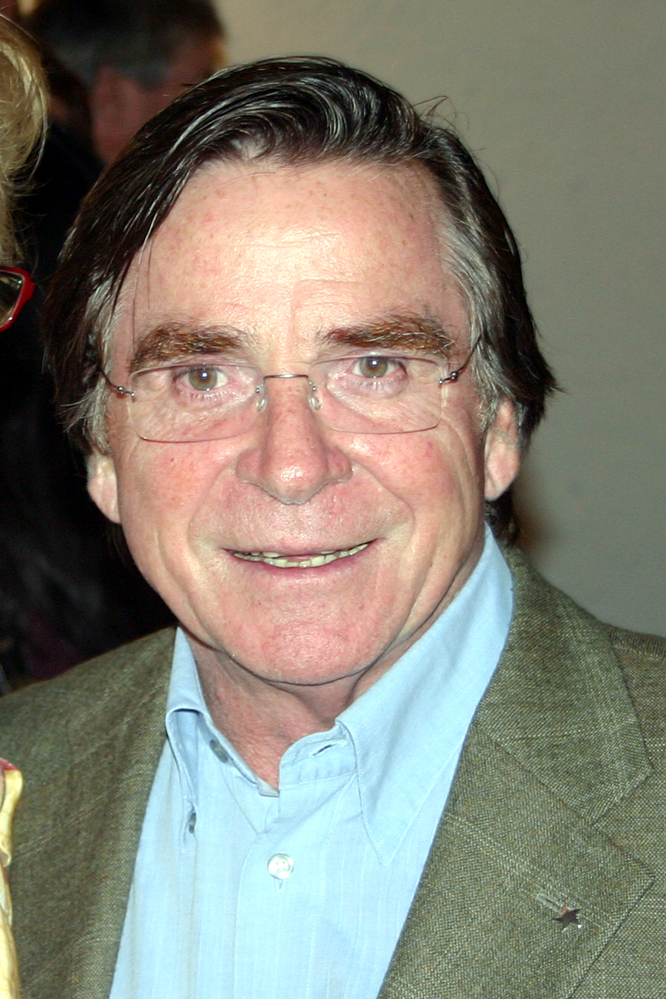
Elmar Wepper

- 3 October – Johannes Kühn, 89, writer (b. 1934)
- 6 October – Bodo Schümann, 87, theologian and politician (b. 1936)
- 17 October – Dirk Alvermann, 57, historian and archivar (b. 1965)
- 19 October – Dietrich Geyer, 94, historian (b. 1928)
- 20 October – Norbert Buske, 87, politician and theologian (b. 1936)
- 21 October – Manfred Braun, 95, politician (b. 1928)
- 23 October – Lutz Riemann, 82, actor (b. 1940)
- 24 October
  - Hans Albert, 102, philosopher (b. 1921)
  - Heinz Günther Hüsch, 94, lawyer and politician (b. 1929)
- 27 October – Ignaz Walter, 87, businessman and entrepreneur (b. 1936)
- 30 October – Hans Meiser, 77, journalist, TV-moderator and TV talkshow host (b. 1946)
- 31 October – Elmar Wepper, 79, actor (b. 1944)

=== November ===
- 1 November – Erich Zakowski, 89, mechanic (b. 1933)
- 2 November – Jutta Müller, 94, figure skater (b. 1928)
- 29 November – Henry Kissinger, 100, politician (b. 1923)

=== December ===
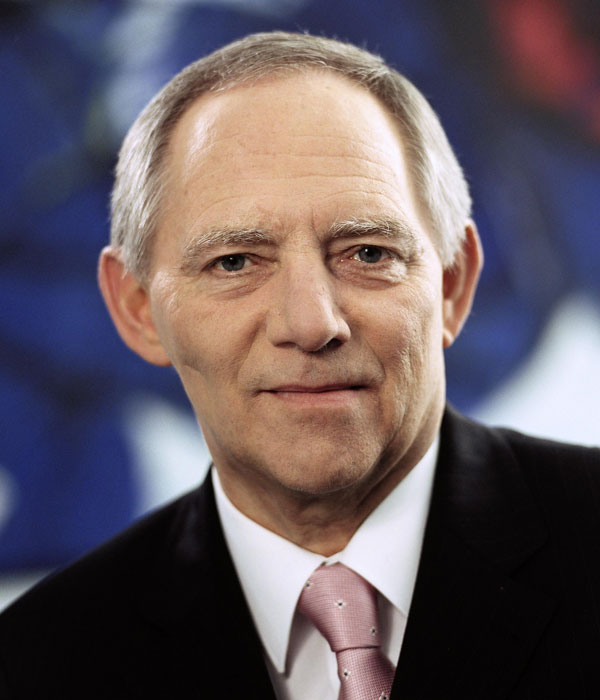
Wolfgang Schäuble

- 3 December – Klaus Bernbacher, 92, conductor (b. 1931).
- 4 December – Peter R. Adam, 66, film editor (An American Werewolf in Paris, Good Bye, Lenin!, Anonymous) (b. 1957)
- 5 December – Wolfgang Wieland, 75, lawyer and politician, MP (2005–2013) (b. 1948).
- 7 December – Guy Stern, 101, German-American intelligence officer (Ritchie Boys) (b. 1922).
- 8 December – Peter-Michael Kolbe, 70, rower (b. 1953)
- 10 December – Dieter Stolte, 89, journalist (b. 1934)
- 11 December – Ferdinand Keller, 77, footballer (TSV 1860 Munich, Hannover 96, West Germany national team) (b. 1946).
- 13 December – Hermann Brede, 100, architect (b. 1923)
- 16 December – Bernd Siebert, 74, politician, MP (1994–2009, 2010–2017, 2020–2021) (b. 1949)
- 19 December – Gunther Emmerlich, 79, operatic bass and show presenter (b. 1944)
- 21 December – Rebekka Habermas, 64, historian (b. 1959)
- 22 December – Ingrid Steeger, 76, actress (Nurse Report, Three Men in the Snow, Andre Handles Them All) (b. 1947)
- 25 December – Frieder Birzele, 83, politician (b. 1940)
- 26 December – Wolfgang Schäuble, 81, politician, MP (1972-2023), former interior and financial minister (b. 1942)
