= 2023 in architecture =

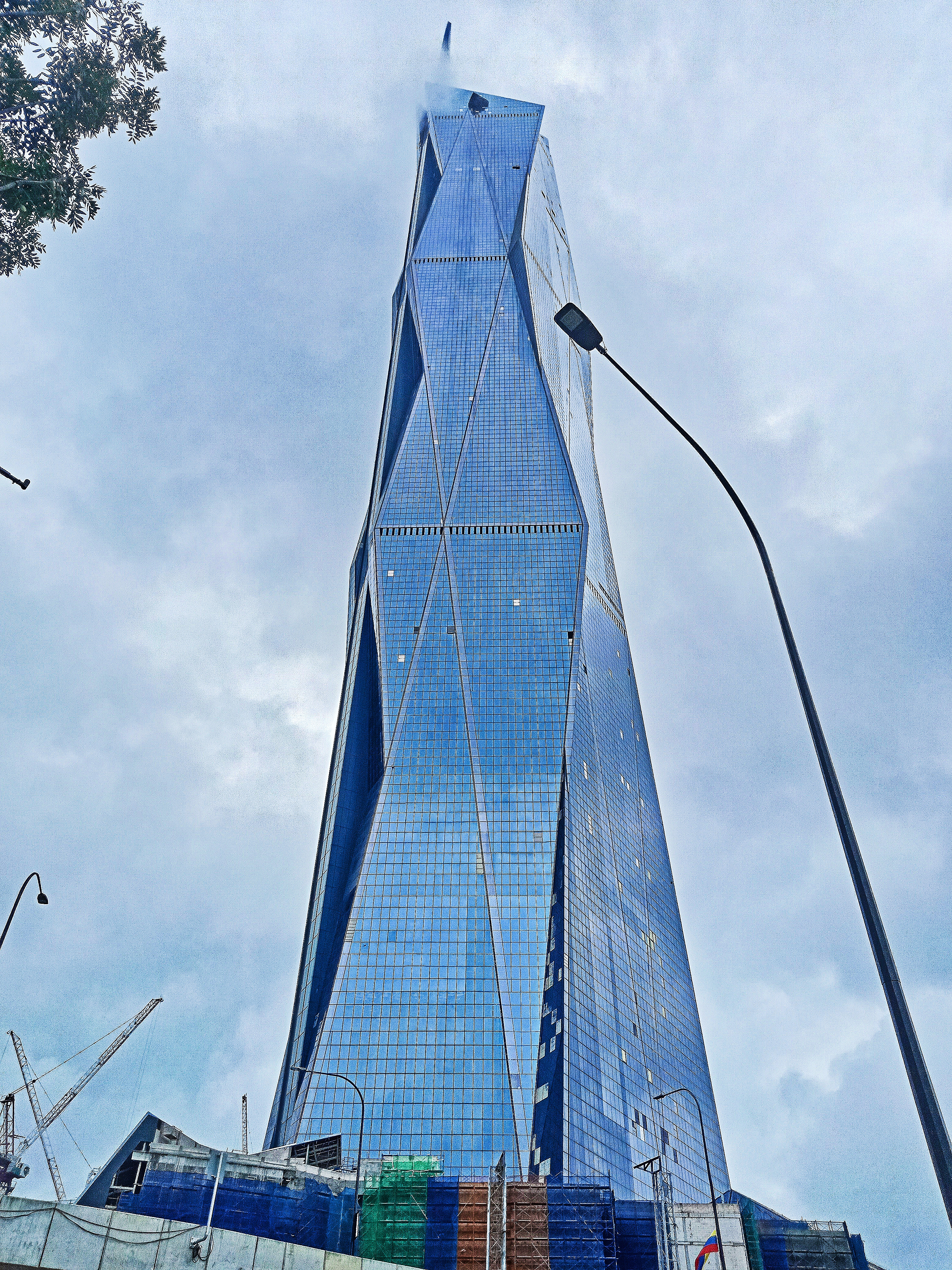
Merdeka 118 in Kuala Lumpur, Malaysia.

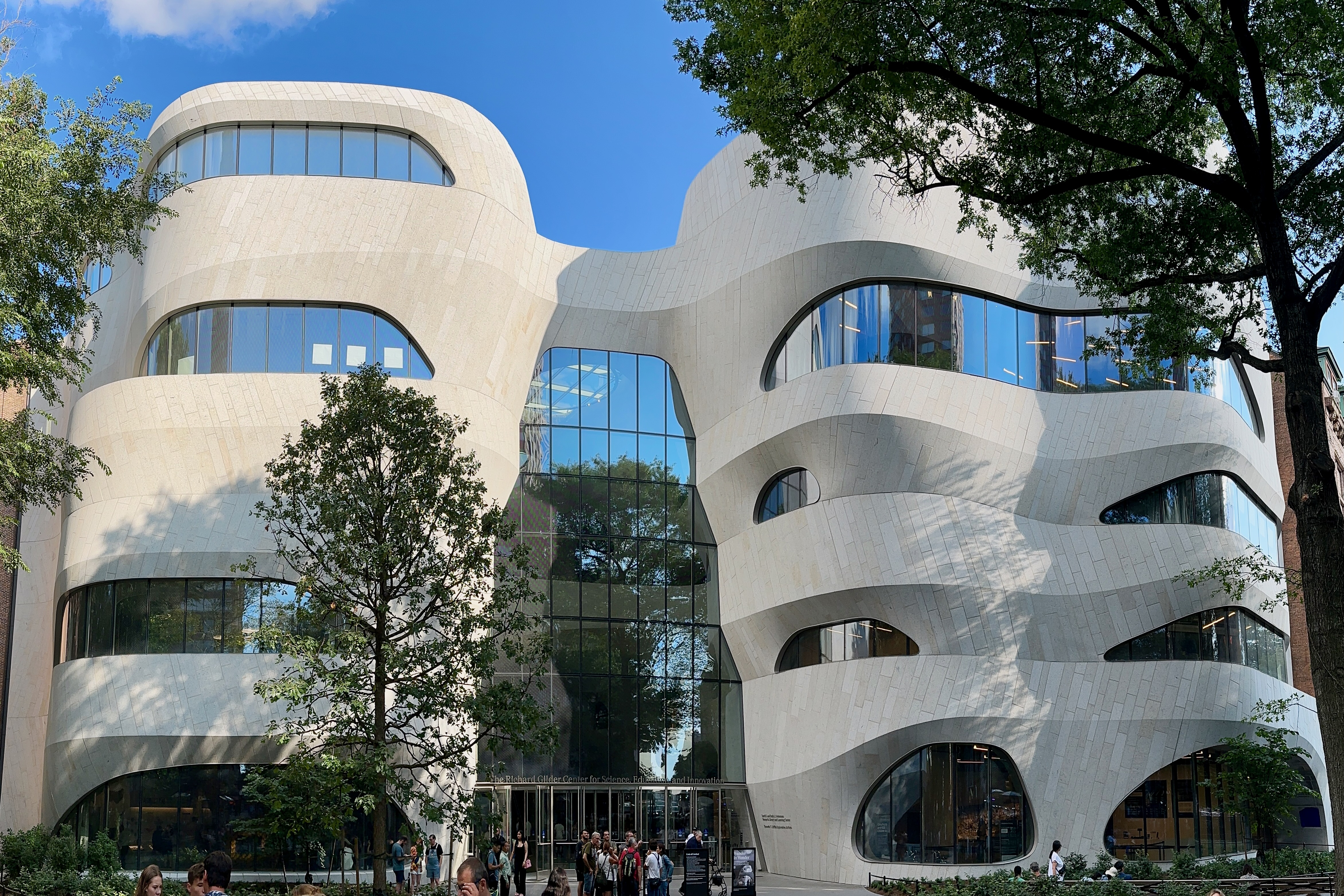
Richard Gilder Center in New York City

The year 2023 in architecture involved some significant architectural events and new buildings.

== Events ==
- July 23 – The Transfiguration Cathedral in Odesa is severely damaged in a Russian missile attack on the city.
- September 1 – Muyiwa Oki takes office as the youngest and first black president of the Royal Institute of British Architects.

== Buildings and structures ==
China

- Zhongshuge bookstore in Huai'an, designed by X+ Living Architectural Design

Egypt

- Grand Egyptian Museum in Giza, designed by Heneghan Peng Architects, projected for completion

Malaysia

- Merdeka 118 in Kuala Lumpur, the second-tallest structure and the second-tallest building in the world, designed by Fender Katsalidis in association with RSP KL, officially opened on 10 January 2024.

Saudi Arabia

- Red Sea International Airport designed by Foster + Partners, projected for completion

United Kingdom

- Factory International (Aviva Studios) arts venue in Manchester, designed by Office for Metropolitan Architecture (OMA; lead architect Ellen van Loon) opened officially on 18 October (previews from June)
- Lion Green Road (apartment blocks), Coulsdon (London Borough of Croydon), by Mary Duggan Architects with RUFF Architects

United States

- Buffalo AKG Art Museum in Buffalo, New York, projected for completion
- The Richard Gilder Center for Science, Education, and Innovation at the American Museum of Natural History in New York City designed by Studio Gang opened to the public on May 4
- Vici Properties finishes construction of the sphere, the largest sphere in the world in Las Vegas, Nevada

== Awards ==
- AIA Gold Medal – Carol Ross Barney
- Driehaus Architecture Prize for New Classical Architecture – Ben Pentreath
- Pritzker Architecture Prize – David Chipperfield
- RIBA Royal Gold Medal – Yasmeen Lari
- RAIA Gold Medal – Kirstin Thompson
- RIBA House of the Year – Green House, Tottenham, London, designed by Hayhurst & Co
- Stirling Prize – Mæ for John Morden Centre, Blackheath, London

== Exhibitions ==
- Venice Biennale of Architecture: 20 May – 26 November
- Copenhagen Architecture Festival x FILM: 1 – 11 June

== Deaths ==
- January 1 – Ron Labinski, 85, American stadium architect (b. 1937)
- January 6 – William S.W. Lim, 90, Singaporean architect (b. 1932)
- January 7 – József Finta, 88, Hungarian architect (b. 1935)
- January 12 – Vittorio Garatti, 95, Italian architect (b. 1927)
- January 24 – Balkrishna Vithaldas Doshi, 95, Indian architect, Pritzker Prize winner (2018) (b. 1927)
- January 31 – Graham Winteringham, 99, English architect (Crescent Theatre) (b. 1923) (death announced on this date)
- February 13 – Robert Geddes, 99, American architect, dean of the Princeton University School of Architecture (1965–1982) (b. 1923)
- February 17 – Peter Muller, 95, Australian architect (b. 1927)
- March 2 – Rafael Viñoly, 78, Uruguayan-born architect (b. 1944)
- May 30 – Paolo Portoghesi, 91, Italian architect (Mosque of Rome) (b. 1931)
- June 17 – Sir Michael Hopkins, 88, English architect (Portcullis House) (b. 1935)
- July 17 – Bruno Flierl, 96, German architect (b. 1927)
- August 7 – Jean-Louis Cohen, French architect and architectural historian (b. 1949)
- August 13 – Thierry Despont, 75, French architect and interior designer (b. 1948)
- September 12 – Roser Amadó, 79, Spanish architect (La Vila Olímpica del Poblenou) (b. 1944)
- September 15 – Claude Cormier, 63, Canadian landscape architect (b. 1960)
- October 1 – Beverly Willis, American architect (San Francisco Ballet Building) (b. 1928)
- October 3 – Harriet Pattison, American landscape architect (b. 1928)
- October 17 – George Baird, 84, Canadian architect (Cloud Gardens, Niagara Parks Butterfly Conservatory) (b. 1939)
- October 21 – N. John Habraken, 94, Dutch architect, educator, and theorist of user participation in housing (b. 1928)
- November 1 – Jonathan Hill, 65, English architect and architectural historian (b. 1958)
- November 6 – Antoni Martí, 60, Andorran architect and politician (b. 1963)
- November 9 – Juha Leiviskä, 87, Finnish architect and designer (b. 1936)
- November 14 – Stanislav Žalud, 91, Czech architect and politician (b. 1932)
- November 18 – Jerome Markson, 94, Canadian architect (b. 1929)
- November 20 – Rob Krier, 85, Luxembourgish sculptor, architect, and urban designer (b. 1938)
- December 2 – Felo García, 95, Costa Rican footballer, painter, and architect (b. 1928)
- December 9 – Gene Aubry, 88, American architect (b. 1935)
- December 13 – Hermann Brede, 100, German architect (b. 1923)
- December 19 – Bryan Thomas, 95, English architect (b. 1928)
- December 25 – Pamela Cluff, 92, British-born Canadian architect (b. 1931)

== See also ==
- Timeline of architecture
