= Frieder =

Frieder is both a surname and a masculine given name, a variant of Friedrich. People with the name include:

Surname:

- Armin Frieder (1911–1946), Slovak Neolog rabbi
- Bill Frieder (1942), former basketball coach
- Katalin Frieder (1915–1991), Hungarian pianist

Given name:

- Frieder Bernius (1947), German conductor
- Frieder Birzele (1940–2023), German politician
- Frieder Burda (1936–2019), German art collector
- Frieder Gröger (1934–2018), German mycologist
- Frieder Lippmann (1936–2023), German politician
- Frieder Nake (1938), German computer scientist
- Frieder Weissmann (1893–1984), German conductor and composer
- Frieder Zschoch (1932–2016), German musicologist
