= Schümann =

Schümann is a German occupational surname.. Notable people with the name include:

- Bodo Schümann (1937–2023), German theologian and politician
- Jannik Schümann (born 1992), German actor
- Jochen Schümann, German sailor
- Ulrike Schümann, German sailor
