= Jenő Jandó =

Hungarian pianist (1952–2023)

- Born: 1 February 1952; Pécs, Hungary
- Died: 4 July 2023 (aged 71); Budapest, Hungary
- Education: Liszt Academy
- Occupations: Pianist; Professor of Music
- Spouse: Tamara Takács

Jenő Jandó (Hungarian: [ˈjɛnøː ˈjɒndoː]; 1 February 1952 – 4 July 2023) was a Hungarian pianist and Professor of the Franz Liszt Academy of Music in Budapest. He was the first house pianist for Naxos Records and recorded more than 60 albums.

== Background and education ==
Jandó studied piano at the Liszt Academy with Katalin Nemes and Pál Kadosa, later going on to win many major international piano competitions, including the Georges Cziffra and Ciani Piano Competitions. His professional career began when he took third prize at the Beethoven Piano Competition at the age of 18. He was also the winner of the 1973 Hungarian Piano Concours and took first prize in the chamber music category at the Sydney International Piano Competition in 1977.

== Recordings ==
Jandó began recording exclusively for Naxos Records in 1988 as the label's first house pianist. Naxos describes him as "one of the most prolific artists in the history of classical music recording".

Jandó recorded over 60 albums, including music by Bach, Beethoven, Liszt, Mozart, Schumann, Schubert, Brahms, Haydn, Bartók, Chopin, and many other composers.

His (chamber) music recordings range from the complete Beethoven sonatas to Schubert's 'Trout' Quintet and Beethoven's 'Ghost' and 'Archduke' piano trios. He worked with Takako Nishizaki in recordings of the Beethoven, Franck, and Grieg violin sonatas, the complete Schubert sonatas, and the Mozart sonatas, some of which are highly ranked by The Penguin Guide to Recorded Classical Music. His style of collaborating is evident in Kodály's Cello Sonata (Op. 4), as well as in a more recent recording of Dohnányi cello sonatas with Maria Kliegel.

Jandó was known for singing while playing and stopped this by putting an unlit cigarette in his mouth.

== Death ==
Jandó died on 4 July 2023, at the age of 71.

== Awards ==
He received the Franz Liszt Prize and the Knight’s Cross of the Hungarian Order of Merit.
