= Irmhild Bossdorf =

German journalist and politician (born 1967)

Irmhild Bossdorf MEP
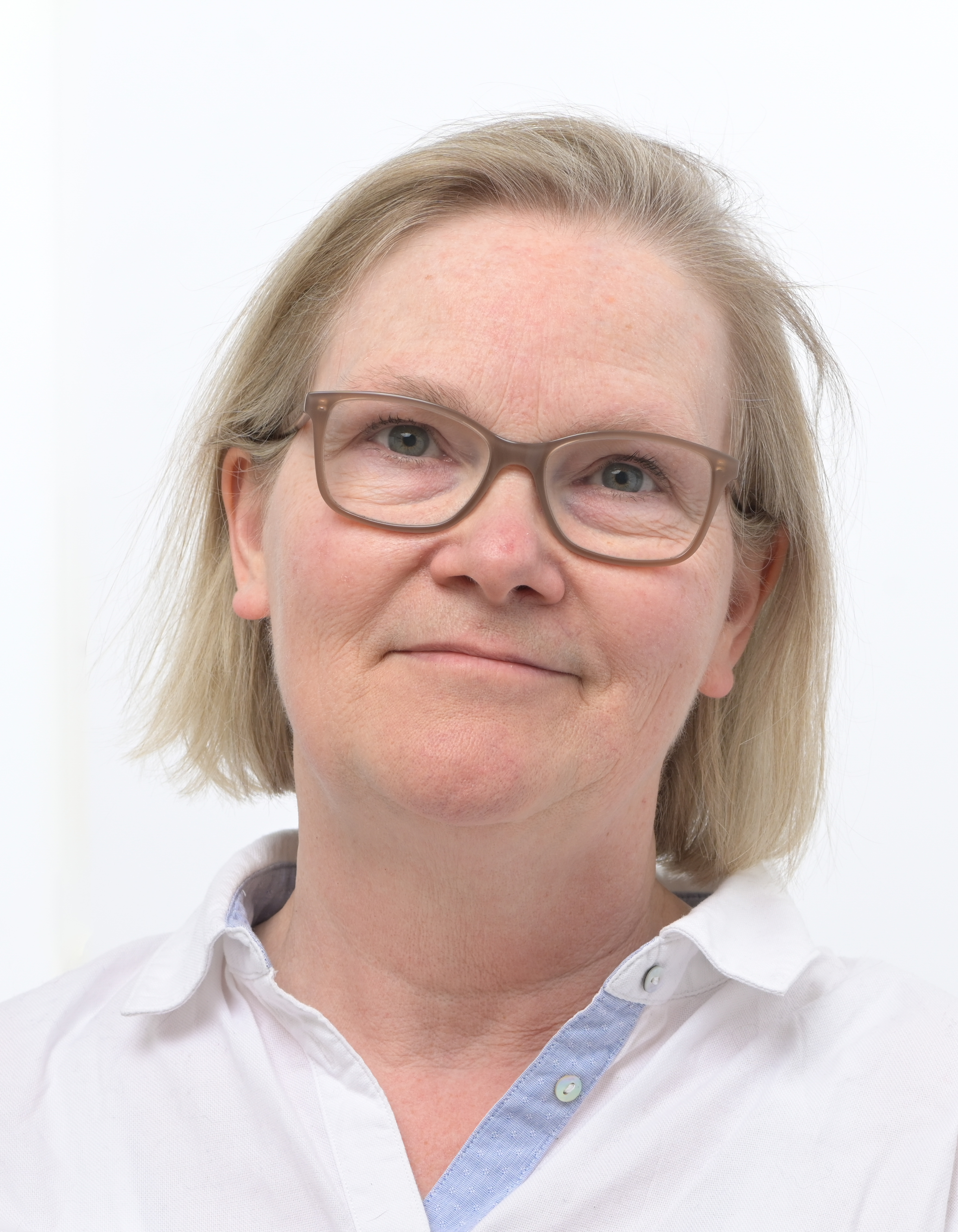
- Bossdorf in 2024

Member of the European Parliament for Germany
- Incumbent
- Assumed office 16 July 2024

Personal details
- Born: 14 January 1967 (age 59) Mechelen, Belgium
- Party: Alternative for Germany
- Other political affiliations: Europe of Sovereign Nations
- Parent: Günther Deschner (father)

Irmhild Bossdorf (born 14 January 1967) is a German journalist and politician of Alternative for Germany who was elected member of the European Parliament in 2024. She is the daughter of journalist Günther Deschner.
