= Thomas Kretschmer (politician) =

German politician (1954–2023)

Member of the Landtag of Thuringia
- In office 25 October 1990 – 12 December 2008
- Constituency: Wahlkreis-Mühlhausen I (1990–1994); Unstrut-Hainich-Kreis I (1994–2008)

Personal details
- Born: 20 October 1954 Magdeburg, East Germany
- Died: 9 January 2023 (aged 68)
- Party: CDU
- Education: Karl-Marx-Stadt College of Mechanical Engineering
- Occupation: Engineer

Thomas Kretschmer (20 October 1954 – 9 January 2023) was a German engineer and politician. A member of the Christian Democratic Union, he served in the Landtag of Thuringia from 1990 to 2008.

Kretschmer died on 9 January 2023, at the age of 68.
