= Jonas Urbach =

German politician (born 1982)

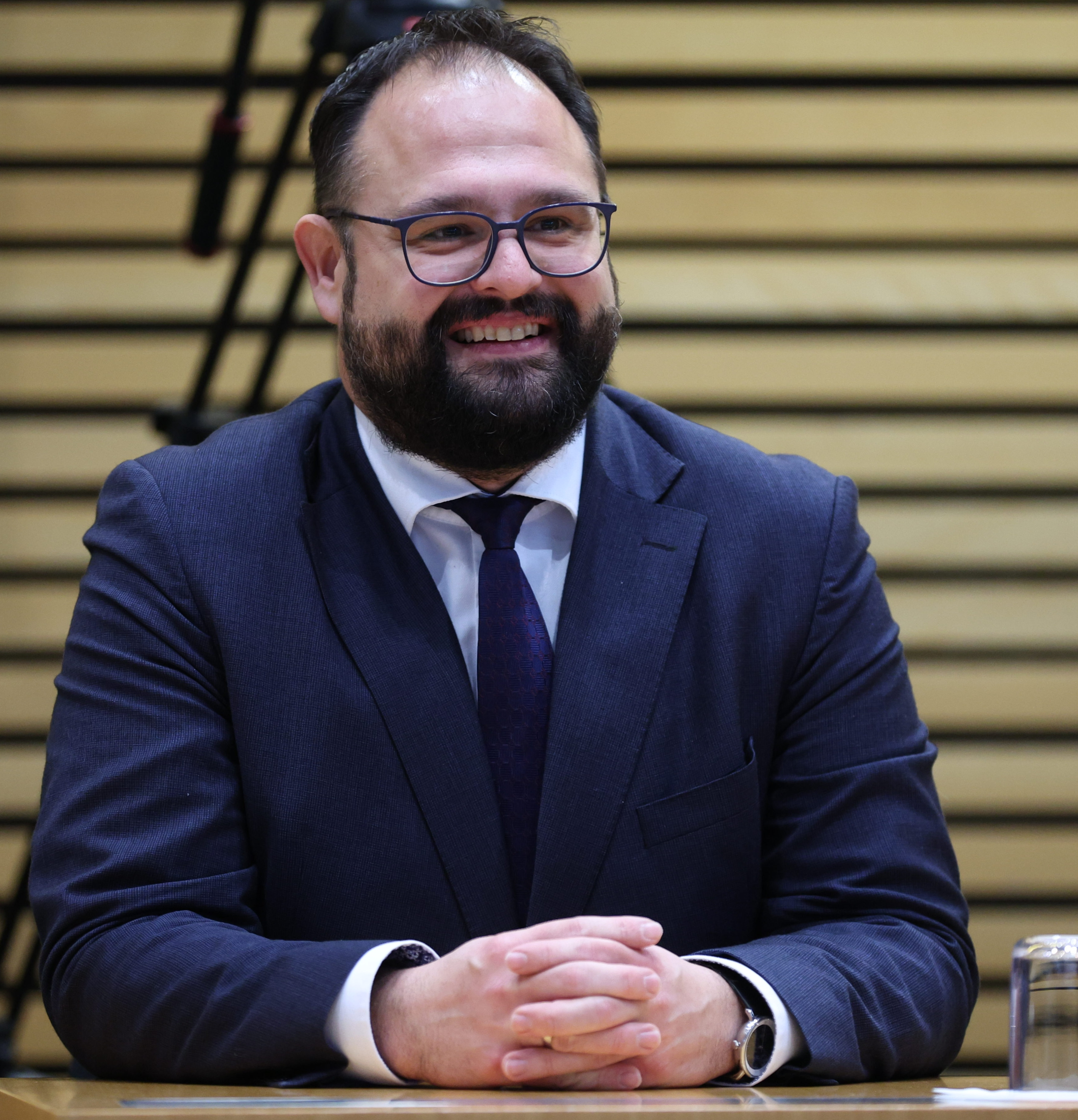
- Urbach in 2024

Member of the Landtag of Thuringia
- Incumbent
- Assumed office 26 November 2019
- Preceded by: Elke Holzapfel
- Constituency: Unstrut-Hainich-Kreis I

Personal details
- Born: 24 September 1982 (age 43)
- Party: Christian Democratic Union

Jonas Urbach (born 24 September 1982) is a German politician serving as a member of the Landtag of Thuringia since 2019. He has served as mayor of Bickenriede since 2015.
