= Jürgen Claus =

German painter and author (1935–2023)

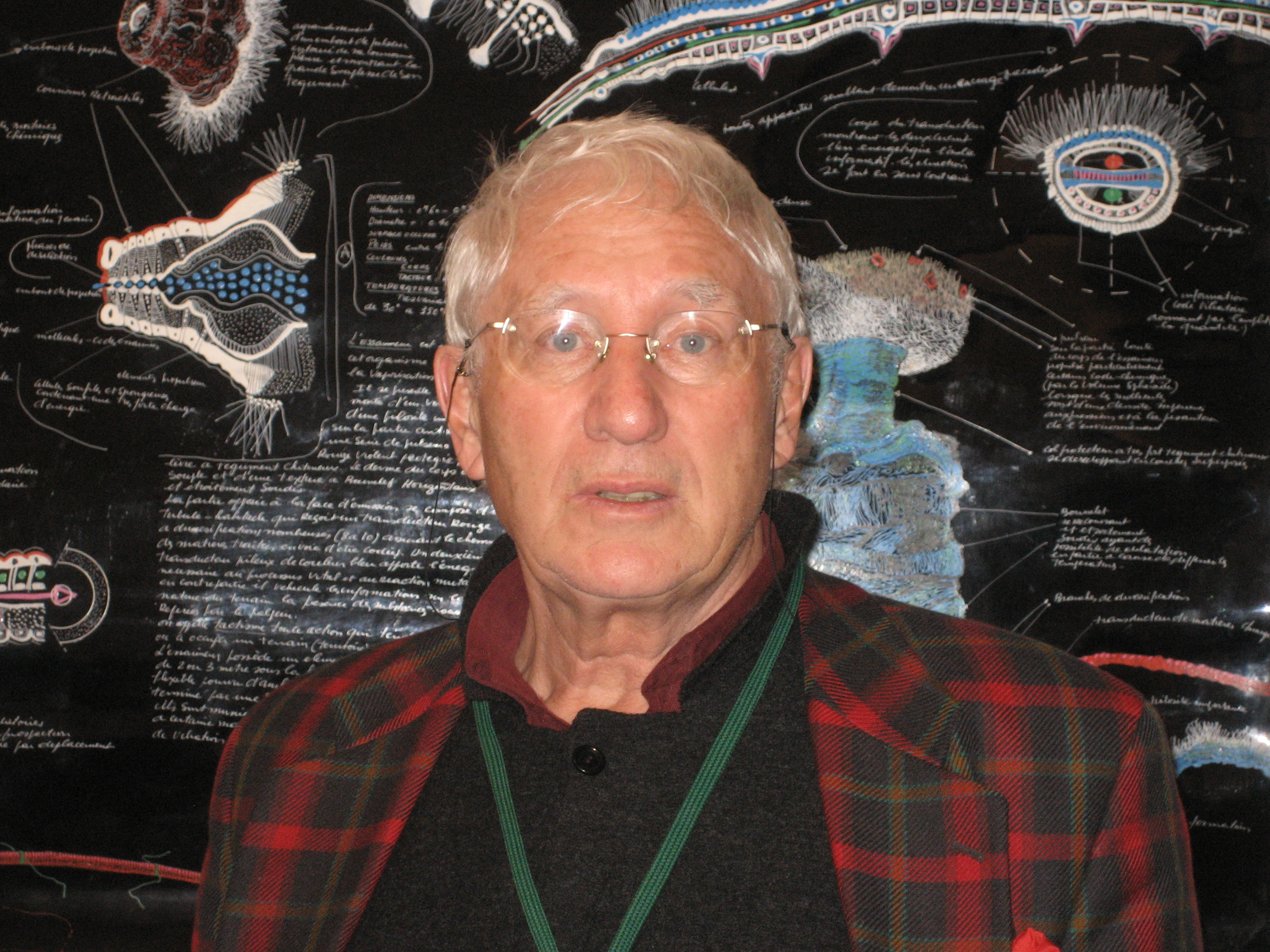
Claus in 2007

Jürgen Claus (28 May 1935 – 5 September 2023) was a German artist and author.

== Biography ==
Claus was born on 28 May 1935 in Aachen, Germany. He worked as a visual artist, using various techniques; painting, film, light and solar installations, and underwater art. As an author, he wrote numerous works on media art and the development of its theory. Claus died on 5 September 2023 in Aachen at the age of 88.
