= Ismail Tipi =

German politician (1959–2023)

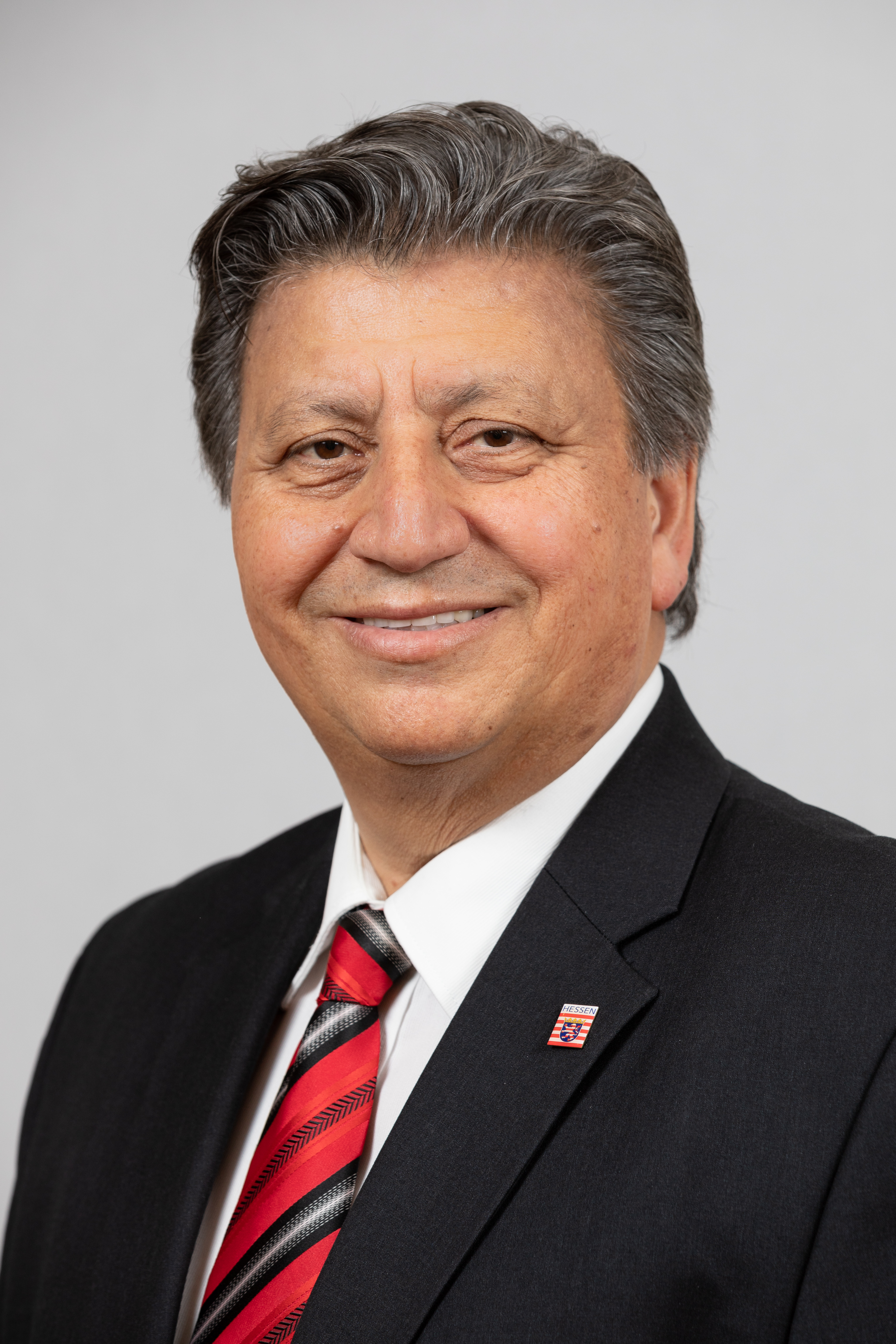

Member of Hessian Parliament, Offenbach Place 2
- In office February 9, 2010 – February 3, 2023
- Preceded by: Volker Hoff

Personal details
- Born: 3 January 1959 İzmir, Turkey
- Died: 3 February 2023 (aged 64) Offenbach am Main, Hesse, Germany
- Party: CDU
- Occupation: Politician

Ismail Tipi (3 January 1959 – 3 February 2023) was a German politician (CDU) and member of the Hessian parliament.

== Professional life ==
Of ethnic Turkish origin, Tipi lived in Germany since 1972. By 1995 he received German citizenship. He worked as a journalist for Turkish and German media, among others, for the Turkish-language Hürriyet as deputy editorial director Europe for Star TV and for the Offenbach-Post.

== Politics ==
Tipi was a member of the CDU since 1999. In 2006 he was elected an Alderman in Heusenstamm, in 2007 a council deputy for Offenbach. In the Hessian state election of 2009 he was a candidate number 67 of the state list and a replacement candidate in place 2 for the Offenbach. Following the resignation of Volker Hoff from the Hessian parliament, he was promoted to the parliament on February 9, 2010. He was the first ethnic Turkish politician in the Hessian CDU. Tipi retained his seat in the Hessian state election of 2013 with a direct mandate in place 2 for Offenbach with 46.1% of the vote.

Tipi called internal security, religious extremism, immigration and integration policies his priorities. He had since made a name in the fight against religious extremism, above all, Salafism, nationwide. His political commitment against radical Salafists had already led to death threats against his person. Tipi considers the recent recruitment by Salafists in German schools to be particularly dangerous.

In the Hessen parliament Tipi was assigned to the Committee for Europe (EEA), the Committee of Social Affairs and Inclusion (SIA), the Council of Elders and the Main Committee (HAA). He was also the spokesman for integration policy for the CDU parliamentary caucus in Hesse and chairman of the State Committee of Experts "Integration and Migration" for the CDU in Hesse and a member of the education inquiry-commission.

== Personal life ==
Tipi was married and had a daughter.

Tipi was committed to Islam, but said he was raised in a secular household. He was committed to stopping Salafism and a parallel Islamic judicial system in Germany. He felt that the use of so-called Islamic magistrates hinder successful integration of Muslims in Germany.
