= List of largest spherical buildings =

This article is a list of the largest spherical buildings in the world. In order to qualify for inclusion, the spherical construction for each entry must be the building itself (not spherical extension on the exterior of the building).

Name	image	Diameter		% of sphere	Location	Completed	Removed	Held record
Name	image	m	ft	% of sphere	Location	Completed	Removed	Held record
Las Vegas Sphere		157	515.1	71.3 %	Las Vegas, Nevada, United States	29 September 2023	–	29 September 2023 – current
Avicii Arena (Globen)		110.40	362.2	77.2 %	Stockholm, Sweden	19 February 1989	–	19 February 1989 – 29 September 2023
Kazakhstan Pavilion and Science Museum (Nur Alem)		80	262	~100 %	Astana, Kazakhstan	10 June 2017	–	never
Montreal Biosphere		76	249	81.6 %	Montreal, Canada	27 April 1967	20 May 1976 (by fire)	27 April 1967 – 20 May 1976
Montreal Biosphere		76	249	81.6 %	Montreal, Canada	1995 (renovated)	–	never
Perisphere		54.9	180	~100 %	Queens, New York City, United States	13 August 1938	December 1941	13 August 1938 – December 1941
Spaceship Earth (Epcot)		50.3	165	~100 %	Orlando, Florida, United States	1 October 1982	–	1 October 1982 – 19 February 1989
Oriental Pearl Tower		50	164	~100 %	Shanghai, China	1994	–	never
Eurosat - CanCan Coaster		43	141		Europa-Park, Germany	1989	–	never
La Géode		36	118	86.1 %	Paris, France	6 May 1985	–	never
Nagoya City Science Museum		35	115	~100 %	Sakae, Nagoya, Japan	3 November 1962	–	20 May 1976 – 1 October 1982
Nagoya City Science Museum		35	115	~100 %	Sakae, Nagoya, Japan	3 November 1962	–	3 November 1962 – 27 April 1967
Fernsehturm Berlin		32	105	~100 %	Berlin, Germany	3 October 1969	–	–
Apple Marina Bay Sands		30	98	~56.7 %	Marina Bay Sands, Singapore	10 September 2020	–	never
Kugelmugel		8	26	~100 %	Katzelsdorf, Austria (originally); Vienna, Austria (currently)	1971	–	never
