= Günther Deschner =

German author and historian (1941–2023)

- Born: 14 May 1941; Fürth, Gau Franconia, Germany
- Died: 11 January 2023 (aged 81)
- Education: University of Erlangen–Nuremberg
- Occupations: Author; Historian
- Children: Irmhild Bossdorf

Günther Deschner (14 May 1941 – 11 January 2023) was a German author, historian, journalist, and filmmaker.

== Biography ==
Born in Fürth on 14 May 1941, Deschner studied history and political science at the University of Erlangen–Nuremberg. He was a student of Hans-Joachim Schoeps and received his doctorate in 1968 with the work Gobineau und Deutschland. Der Einfluss von Gobineaus «Essai sur l’inégalité des races humaines» auf die deutsche Geistesgeschichte 1853–1917. He then worked as a lecturer and editor for various newspapers and publishers until settling on Die Welt, where he worked until 2005. He continued to contribute to Junge Freiheit.

Deschner was a member of the board of directors of Verein für Deutsche Kulturbeziehungen im Ausland from 1976 to 1981. In the 1980s, he served on the editorial board of Nouvelle École, the newspaper of the ethnonationalist think tank GRECE. In October 1987, he became editor-in-chief of Unabhängigen Nachrichtenmagazins PLUS, which aimed to break the alleged "autocracy" of Der Spiegel and to prevent part-owner Rudolf Augstein "from conducting further character assassination campaigns". In 1990, he founded the media publishing house Media D, which produced numerous films.

Deschner was founding editor-in-chief of the far-right magazine Zuerst!, where his works were published by Dietmar Munier, including his statement "I and my colleagues have not written in the world differently than we write today. If you think that's right-wing today, you can say that we didn't move further to the right, but that the party system and the media landscape moved further to the left".

Deschner also defended the Kurdish independence movement, speaking with Mustafa Barzani and Jalal Talabani, the latter of whom led the Patriotic Union of Kurdistan, as well as Kurdistan Workers' Party leader Abdullah Öcalan. According to him, the Kurds were used as pawns on the chessboard of regional and international politics.

Günther Deschner died on 11 January 2023, at the age of 81.

== Publications ==
- Gobineau und Deutschland: Der Einfluß von J. A. de Gobineaus „Essai sur inégalité des races humaines“ auf die deutsche Geistesgeschichte 1853-1917 (1968)
- Menschen im Ghetto (1969)
- Reinhard Heydrich. Statthalter der totalen Macht (1977)
- Saladins Söhne: Die Kurden – das betrogene Volk (1983)
- Der 2. Weltkrieg. Bilder, Daten, Dokumente (1983)
- Gab es ein „Unternehmen Barbarossa“ der Westmächte? Eine historische Betrachtung (1984)
- Die Kurden, das betrogene Volk (1989)
- Die Kurden. Volk ohne Staat (2003)
- Bomben auf Baku, Kriegspläne der Alliierten gegen die Sowjetunion 1939/1940 (2009)
- Friedrich der Große und sein Preußen in historischen Gemälden (2010)
