= Unstrut-Hainich-Kreis I =

Electoral constituency represented in the Landtag of Thuringia

Unstrut-Hainich-Kreis I is an electoral constituency (German: Wahlkreis) represented in the Landtag of Thuringia. It elects one member via first-past-the-post voting. Under the current constituency numbering system, it is designated as constituency 8. It covers the northwestern part of Unstrut-Hainich-Kreis.

Unstrut-Hainich-Kreis I was created for the 1994 state election. Since 2019, it has been represented by Jonas Urbach of the Christian Democratic Union (CDU).

== Geography ==
As of the 2019 state election, Unstrut-Hainich-Kreis I covers the northwestern part of Unstrut-Hainich-Kreis, specifically the municipalities of Anrode, Dünwald, Menteroda, Mühlhausen/Thüringen (excluding Bollstedt, Grabe, Höngeda und Seebach), Rodeberg, Südeichsfeld, and Unstruttal.

== Members ==
The constituency has been held by the Christian Democratic Union since its creation in 1994. Its first representative was Thomas Kretschmer, who served from 1994 to 2009, followed by Elke Holzapfel (2009–2019) and Jonas Urbach (2019–present).

Election	Member	Party	%
1994	Thomas Kretschmer	CDU	44.3
1999	Thomas Kretschmer	CDU	53.1
2004	Thomas Kretschmer	CDU	49.7
2009	Elke Holzapfel	CDU	31.3
2014	Elke Holzapfel	CDU	36.2
2019	Jonas Urbach	CDU	31.1
2024	Jonas Urbach	CDU	37.1

== Election results ==
=== 2024 election ===
State election (2024): Unstrut-Hainich-Kreis I
Notes:	Blue background denotes the winner of the electorate vote. Pink background denotes a candidate elected from their party list. Yellow background denotes an electorate win by a list member, or other incumbent. A ✓ or ✗ denotes status of any incumbent, win or lose respectively.						
Party	Candidate	Votes	%	±%	Party votes	%	±%
CDU	✓ Jonas Urbach	10,120	37.1	▲6.0	7,037	25.5	▼0.1
AfD	Thomas Groeger	9,627	35.3	▲11.8	8,584	31.2	▲8.2
BSW					4,300	15.6	
Left	Steffen Thormann	4,043	14.8	▼7.4	3,593	13.0	▼14.4
SPD	Kay-Uwe Jagemann	3,460	12.7	▲0.4	1,811	6.6	▼3.0
Greens					585	2.1	▼2.4
FW					509	1.8	
FDP					296	1.1	▼4.0
APT					293	1.1	▼0.2
Familie					165	0.6	
BD					120	0.4	
Values					92	0.3	
Pirates					73	0.3	▲0.1
ÖDP					66	0.2	▼0.2
MLPD					32	0.1	▼0.1
Informal votes		552			246		
Total valid votes		27,250			27,556		
Turnout		27,802	68.6	▲8.4			
CDU hold	Majority	493	1.8	▼5.8			

=== 2019 election ===
State election (2019): Unstrut-Hainich-Kreis I
Notes:	Blue background denotes the winner of the electorate vote. Pink background denotes a candidate elected from their party list. Yellow background denotes an electorate win by a list member, or other incumbent. A ✓ or ✗ denotes status of any incumbent, win or lose respectively.						
Party	Candidate	Votes	%	±%	Party votes	%	±%
CDU	Jonas Urbach	7,878	31.1	▼5.1	6,500	25.6	▼9.1
AfD	Thomas Gröger	5,958	23.5	▲10.9	5,823	23.0	▲11.4
Left	Steffen Thormann	5,625	22.2	▼1.2	6,941	27.4	▲3.0
SPD	Oleg Shevchenko	3,124	12.3	▼5.1	2,441	9.6	▼5.5
Greens	Tino Gaßmann	1,497	5.9	▲0.1	1,143	4.5	▼0.5
FDP	Gerald Werner Schmidt	1,238	4.9	▲2.2	1,306	5.1	▲2.6
List-only parties					1,209	4.8	
Informal votes		416			373		
Total valid votes		25,320			25,363		
Turnout		25,736	60.2	▲11.1			
CDU hold	Majority	1,920	7.6	▼5.2			

=== 2014 election ===
State election (2014): Unstrut-Hainich-Kreis I
Notes:	Blue background denotes the winner of the electorate vote. Pink background denotes a candidate elected from their party list. Yellow background denotes an electorate win by a list member, or other incumbent. A ✓ or ✗ denotes status of any incumbent, win or lose respectively.						
Party	Candidate	Votes	%	±%	Party votes	%	±%
CDU	✓ Elke Holzapfel	7,837	36.2	▲4.9	7,509	34.7	▲0.9
Left	Jörg Kubitzki	5,057	23.4	▼0.1	5,286	24.4	▼0.2
SPD	Holger Poppenhäger	3,764	17.4	▼2.7	3,272	15.1	▼5.0
AfD	Detlef Schiller	2,715	12.6		2,520	11.6	
Greens	Tino Gaßmann	1,246	5.8	▲0.8	1,079	5.0	▲0.2
FDP	Steffen Dreiling	581	2.7	▼5.4	542	2.5	▼5.4
NPD	Marvin Schiel	425	2.0	▼1.3	580	2.7	▼0.5
List-only parties					875	4.0	
Informal votes		335			297		
Total valid votes		21,625			21,663		
Turnout		21,960	49.1	▼6.6			
CDU hold	Majority	2,780	12.8	▲5.0			

=== 2009 election ===
State election (2009): Unstrut-Hainich-Kreis I
Notes:	Blue background denotes the winner of the electorate vote. Pink background denotes a candidate elected from their party list. Yellow background denotes an electorate win by a list member, or other incumbent. A ✓ or ✗ denotes status of any incumbent, win or lose respectively.						
Party	Candidate	Votes	%	±%	Party votes	%	±%
CDU	Elke Holzapfel	7,957	31.3	▼18.4	8,623	33.8	▼16.0
Left	Jörg Kubitzki	5,973	23.5	▼1.6	6,265	24.6	▲2.4
SPD	Bernd Münzberg	5,123	20.1	▲3.4	5,124	20.1	▲5.5
Free Voters	Karl-Josef Montag	2,200	8.7		1,267	5.0	▲2.4
FDP	Steffen Dreiling	2,064	8.1	▲4.1	2,023	7.9	▲4.9
Greens	Knut Ewers	1,276	5.0	▲0.6	1,233	4.8	▲1.8
NPD	Sebastian Böde	839	3.3		810	3.2	▲1.7
List-only parties					170	0.7	
Informal votes		516			433		
Total valid votes		25,432			25,515		
Turnout		25,948	55.7	▲4.1			
CDU hold	Majority	1,984	7.8	▼16.8			

=== 2004 election ===
State election (2004): Unstrut-Hainich-Kreis I
Notes:	Blue background denotes the winner of the electorate vote. Pink background denotes a candidate elected from their party list. Yellow background denotes an electorate win by a list member, or other incumbent. A ✓ or ✗ denotes status of any incumbent, win or lose respectively.						
Party	Candidate	Votes	%	±%	Party votes	%	±%
CDU	✓ Thomas Kretschmer	11,498	49.7	▼3.3	11,702	49.8	▼4.2
PDS	Jörg Kubitzki	5,804	25.1	▲6.0	5,215	22.2	▲4.1
SPD	Walter Pilger	3,873	16.7	▼6.0	3,436	14.6	▼6.3
Greens	Bernward Seipel	1,021	4.4	▲2.5	713	3.0	▲1.5
FDP	Wolfgang Schwarzmann	930	4.0	▲2.4	708	3.0	▲2.2
List-only parties					1,738	7.4	
Informal votes		1,406			1,020		
Total valid votes		23,126			23,512		
Turnout		24,532	51.6	▼9.1			
CDU hold	Majority	5,694	24.6	▼5.7			

=== 1999 election ===
State election (1999): Unstrut-Hainich-Kreis I
Notes:	Blue background denotes the winner of the electorate vote. Pink background denotes a candidate elected from their party list. Yellow background denotes an electorate win by a list member, or other incumbent. A ✓ or ✗ denotes status of any incumbent, win or lose respectively.						
Party	Candidate	Votes	%	±%	Party votes	%	±%
CDU	✓ Thomas Kretschmer	15,431	53.1	▲8.8	15,813	54.0	▲8.7
SPD	Christine Eisenhut	6,622	22.8	▼10.6	6,135	21.0	▼11.6
PDS	Benno Lemke	5,521	19.0	▲6.2	5,290	18.1	▲4.7
Greens	Bernward Seipel	542	1.9	▼2.2	440	1.5	▼1.9
REP	Andreas Bohne	513	1.8		150	0.5	▼0.3
FDP	Dietrich Hose	450	1.5	▼3.0	247	0.8	▼2.0
List-only parties					1,197	4.1	
Informal votes		554			361		
Total valid votes		29,079			29,272		
Turnout		29,633	60.5	▼16.1			
CDU hold	Majority	8,809	30.3	▲19.4			

=== 1994 election ===
State election (1994): Unstrut-Hainich-Kreis I
Notes:	Blue background denotes the winner of the electorate vote. Pink background denotes a candidate elected from their party list. Yellow background denotes an electorate win by a list member, or other incumbent. A ✓ or ✗ denotes status of any incumbent, win or lose respectively.						
Party	Candidate	Votes	%	±%	Party votes	%	±%
CDU	Thomas Kretschmer	16,091	44.3		16,510	45.3	
SPD		12,144	33.4		11,891	32.6	
PDS		4,654	12.8		4,880	13.4	
FDP		1,651	4.5		1,015	2.8	
Greens		1,492	4.1		1,245	3.4	
DSU		307	0.8		118	0.3	
List-only parties					810	2.2	
Informal votes		1,117			987		
Total valid votes		36,339			36,469		
Turnout		37,456	76.6				
CDU win new seat	Majority	3,947	10.9				
