= Sepp Dürr =

German politician (1953–2023)

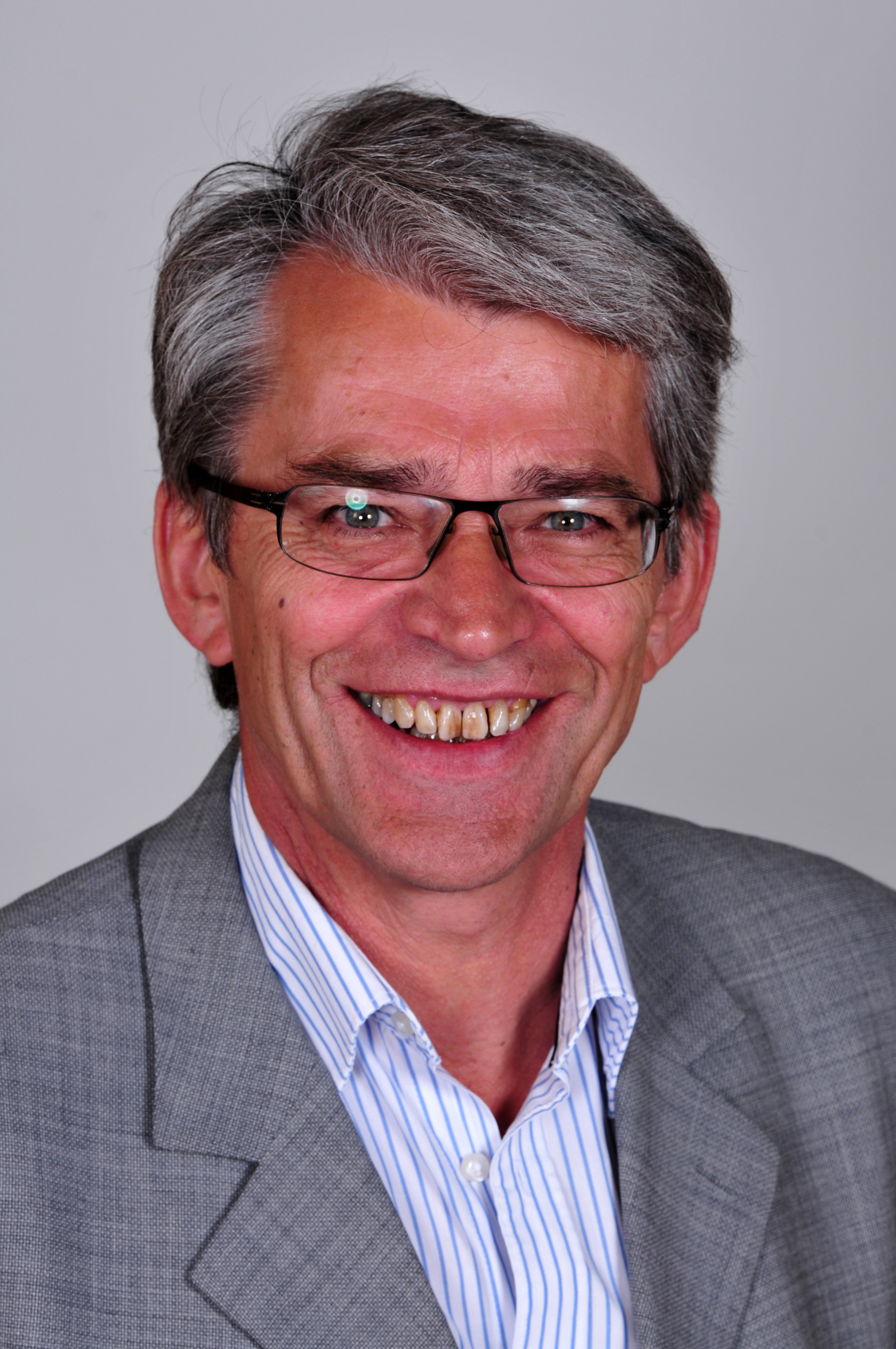
- Dürr in 2012

Member of the Landtag of Bavaria
- In office 28 September 1998 – 5 November 2018

Personal details
- Born: Josef Dürr; 26 December 1953 Munich, Bavaria, West Germany
- Died: 26 January 2023 (aged 69)
- Party: Alliance 90/The Greens
- Profession: Farmer

Josef "Sepp" Dürr (26 December 1953 – 26 January 2023) was a German farmer and politician. A member of Alliance 90/The Greens, he served in the Landtag of Bavaria from 1998 to 2018.

Dürr died of cancer on 26 January 2023, at the age of 69.
