= Mühldorf van crash =

2023 fatal accident in Bavaria, Germany

Details
- Date: 13 October 2023
- Location: Mühldorf, Upper Bavaria
- Country: Germany
- Incident type: Van crash

Statistics
- Passengers: 20+
- Deaths: 7
- Injured: 16

On 13 October 2023, seven illegal immigrants were killed in a van crash in Mühldorf, Germany.

== Background ==
In 2015, illegal immigration from Africa, Asia and Southeastern Europe to the developed countries of Europe increased greatly, with Germany being the most popular destination for economic migrants and those seeking asylum. The inflow has continued at a high level since then.

== Crash ==
During the early hours of 13 October 2023, seven people were killed and about 16 others injured when the van they were travelling in crashed in Mühldorf district of Upper Bavaria in southeastern Germany. The van had Austrian license plates and increased its speed after the police began pursuing it. The van was designed to carry nine people, but it was carrying over 20 passengers when it crashed and overturned on the A94 motorway near the Ampfing/Waldkraiburg junction. The driver and suspected smuggler, a 24-year-old stateless man living in Austria, was injured and tried to flee the scene. He was arrested and taken to hospital. The passengers were illegal immigrants from Syria and Turkey.
