= Hermann-Josef Blanke =

German academic and legal scholar (1957–2023)

- Born: 26 August 1957; Hamm, North Rhine-Westphalia, West Germany
- Died: 9 January 2023 (aged 65)
- Education: University of Bonn; Complutense University of Madrid; University of Florence; Osnabrück University
- Occupations: Professor; Legal scholar

Hermann-Josef Blanke (26 August 1957 – 9 January 2023) was a German academic and legal scholar.

== Biography ==
Blanke was born on 26 August 1957. He studied law and romance studies at the University of Bonn, the Complutense University of Madrid, and the University of Florence. He received his Doctor of Law from Osnabrück University. He worked as a Wissenschaftlicher Assistent at the University of Cologne from 1990 to 1991. He was then a lecturer at the University of Trier, Heinrich Heine University Düsseldorf, the University of Bonn, and the University of Cologne.

From 2000 to 2023, Blanke was a professor of law and political science at the University of Erfurt, specializing in public law, international law, and European integration. During this time, he also held guest professorships in Argentina, Brazil, and Italy.

Blanke was awarded the Grand-Cross of the Order of Saint Raymond of Peñafort in 2018. In 2021, he was awarded a Jean Monnet Chair by the European Commission.

In May 2019, Blanke submitted a Verfassungsbeschwerde against the Thüringer Hochschulgesetz to the Federal Constitutional Court as the legal representative of 32 university professors in Thuringia. At the time of his death, the Court had not yet made a decision.

Blanke died unexpectedly on 9 January 2023, at the age of 65.
