= Pamela Cluff =

British-born Canadian architect (1931–2023)

Pamela Cluff FRAIC FRIBA
- Born: Pamela Jean Johnstone; 21 September 1931; London, United Kingdom
- Died: 25 December 2023 (aged 92)
- Education: South West Essex Technical College (1947–1952)
- Occupation: Architect
- Spouses: Alfred William Cluff (m. 1955; died 1994) Frank Final (m. 1997; died 2011)
- Practice: A.W. Cluff & P.J. Cluff Architects; Associated Planning Consultants
- Design: Accessibility design

Pamela Jean Cluff-Final FRAIC FRIBA (née Johnstone; 21 September 1931 – 25 December 2023) was a British-born Canadian architect specializing in accessibility design.

== Life ==
Cluff was born in London and emigrated to Toronto, Ontario in 1955. Partnering together with her husband, Alfred Cluff, she formed A.W. Cluff & P.J. Cluff Architects in 1957 and later her own company, Associated Planning Consultants. Her design projects included clinics, hospitals, homes for the aged, special care units, nursing homes and group homes. She contributed to various architectural, medical and research journals.

Cluff was a consultant to Canada Mortgage and Housing Corporation and the Ontario Housing Corporation, worked on the Toronto Mayor's Task Force on accessibility issues, and served on committees for the National Building Code of Canada and the Ontario Building Code on Barrier Free Design.

== Awards ==
- Design of Excellence (1969)
- City of Toronto Civic Award (1978)
- Fellow of the Royal Architectural Institute of Canada (1982)
- Canadian Fire Safety Association Special Award (1982)
- Metropolitan Toronto District Health Council Special Award (1983)
- Premiers Award (1985)
- Ontario Association of Architects Order of DaVinci Award (1993)

== Family ==
Cluff had five children, four of whom are living. She was married to Alfred William Cluff in the early 1950s until his death in 1994. She then married Frank Gilbert Final in 1997, who predeceased her in 2011.

Cluff died on 25 December 2023, at the age of 92.
