= Bob Jongen =

Dutch footballer (1927–2023)

Personal information
- Date of birth: 14 May 1927
- Place of birth: Aachen, Rhine Province, Prussia, Germany
- Date of death: 1 January 2023 (aged 95)
- Place of death: Kerkrade, Netherlands
- Position: Forward

Senior career*
Years	Team	Apps	(Gls)
–1945	Roda JC		
1945–1950	Alemannia Aachen		
1950–	Fortuna 54		
–1957	Roda Sport		
1957–1962	Fortuna 54		
- * Club domestic league appearances and goals

Bob Jongen (14 May 1927 – 1 January 2023) was a German-born Dutch footballer, who played as a forward.

== Biography ==
Jongen was born in Aachen, Germany, but grew up in the Dutch town of Kerkrade. He played with Roda JC, Alemannia Aachen, Fortuna 54 and Roda Sport. During his time in Aachen, he also obtained his training diploma at the German Sport University Cologne. After his career he was a scout and referee supervisor at Roda JC. He also owned a hotel and dance hall Le Caveau in Geleen.

In 2018, Jongen told his story in the program Lex ontmoet… at RTV Parkstad.

== Death ==
Jongen died on 1 January 2023, at the age of 95.

== Other websites ==
- Newspaper image (1961)
- Newspaper image (1967)
