= Heinz Golombeck =

German politician (1948–2023)

Member of the Bundestag
- In office 27 October 2009 – 22 October 2013

Personal details
- Born: 19 October 1948 Magdeburg, Saxony-Anhalt, Germany
- Died: 1 August 2023 (aged 74)
- Party: FDP

Heinz Golombeck (19 October 1948 – 1 August 2023) was a German politician. A member of the Free Democratic Party, he served in the Bundestag from 2009 to 2013.

Golombeck died on 1 August 2023, at the age of 74.
