= Financing cost =

Financing cost (FC), also known as the cost of finances (COF), is the cost, interest, and other charges involved in the borrowing of money to build or purchase assets. This can range from the cost it takes to finance a mortgage on a house, to finance a car loan through a bank, or to finance a student loan.

The total expenses associated with securing funds for a project or business arrangement may include interest payments, financing fees charged by intermediary financial institution, and fees or salaries of any personnel required to complete the financing process. This cost includes interest on loans, overdraft charges, etc.

== Mortgages ==
As with most consumer loans, the borrower each month pays back a portion of the principal, the amount borrowed, and the interest accrued. For a fixed payment mortgage, the dollar amount of interest paid is substantially higher in early payments as compared with the last payment. This is because the interest payment is a fixed percentage applied to a declining amount of principle. At the end of the repayment period, almost all of the mortgage payment is applied to the principle. Along with interest charges, lenders may bundle escrow charges and mortgage insurance with the mortgage payments.

== Car loan ==
With smaller purchases, such as vehicles, there is a set amount each month and only a small percentage of the payment goes towards the interest, called a simple interest loan. The interest one pays on a vehicle, APR, is a set amount each month that is calculated into the monthly payments. Some car loans have the option to be paid off faster without penalties, while others specify that they must be paid within a set number of years. One has the option to either extend the loan term for a lower monthly payment, or a shorter term with higher monthly payments. A lower monthly payment with a longer term may involve paying more interest.
