= Eva Schreiber =

German politician (1958–2023)

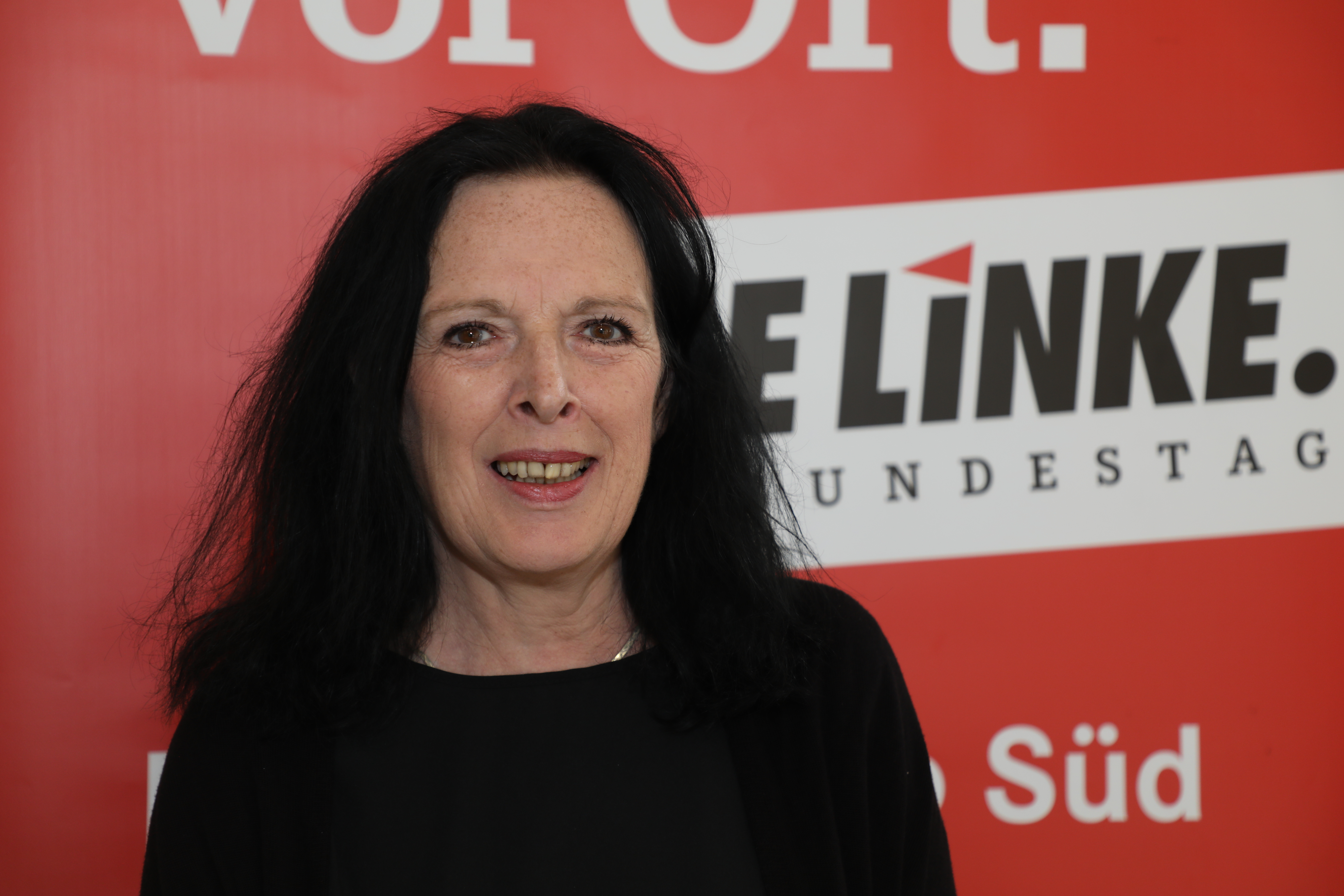
- Schreiber in 2019

Member of the Bundestag
- In office 2017–2021

Personal details
- Born: 12 March 1958 Köln, North Rhine-Westphalia, West Germany
- Died: 8 July 2023 (aged 65)
- Party: The Left
- Website: http://eva-maria-schreiber.de

Eva Schreiber (12 March 1958 – 8 July 2023) was a German politician who represented The Left. She served as a member of the Bundestag from the state of Bavaria from 2017 to 2021.

== Life and career ==
Eva Schreiber was born in Köln, North Rhine-Westphalia. She passed the Abitur examination in 1977 and studied ethnology, intercultural communication and religious studies, graduating with a master's degree. In addition, she was a trained masseuse and medical lifeguard. She worked as a freelance lecturer in the field of adult education and had lived in Munich since 1990. She became a member of the Bundestag after the 2017 German federal election. She was a member of the Committee on the Environment, Nature Conservation and Nuclear Safety, and the Committee on Economic Cooperation and Development.

Schreiber died in July 2023, at the age of 65.
