= Hans Kasper =

German politician (1939–2023)

Member of the Landtag of Saarland
- In office 13 July 1970 – 29 September 1999

Personal details
- Born: 17 January 1939 Wismar, Gau Mecklenburg, Germany
- Died: 20 January 2023 (aged 84)
- Party: SPD

Hans Kasper (17 January 1939 – 20 January 2023) was a German politician. A member of the Social Democratic Party, he served in the Landtag of Saarland from 1970 to 1999.

Kasper died on 20 January 2023, at the age of 84.
