= Lothar Koch (politician) =

German politician (1939–2023)

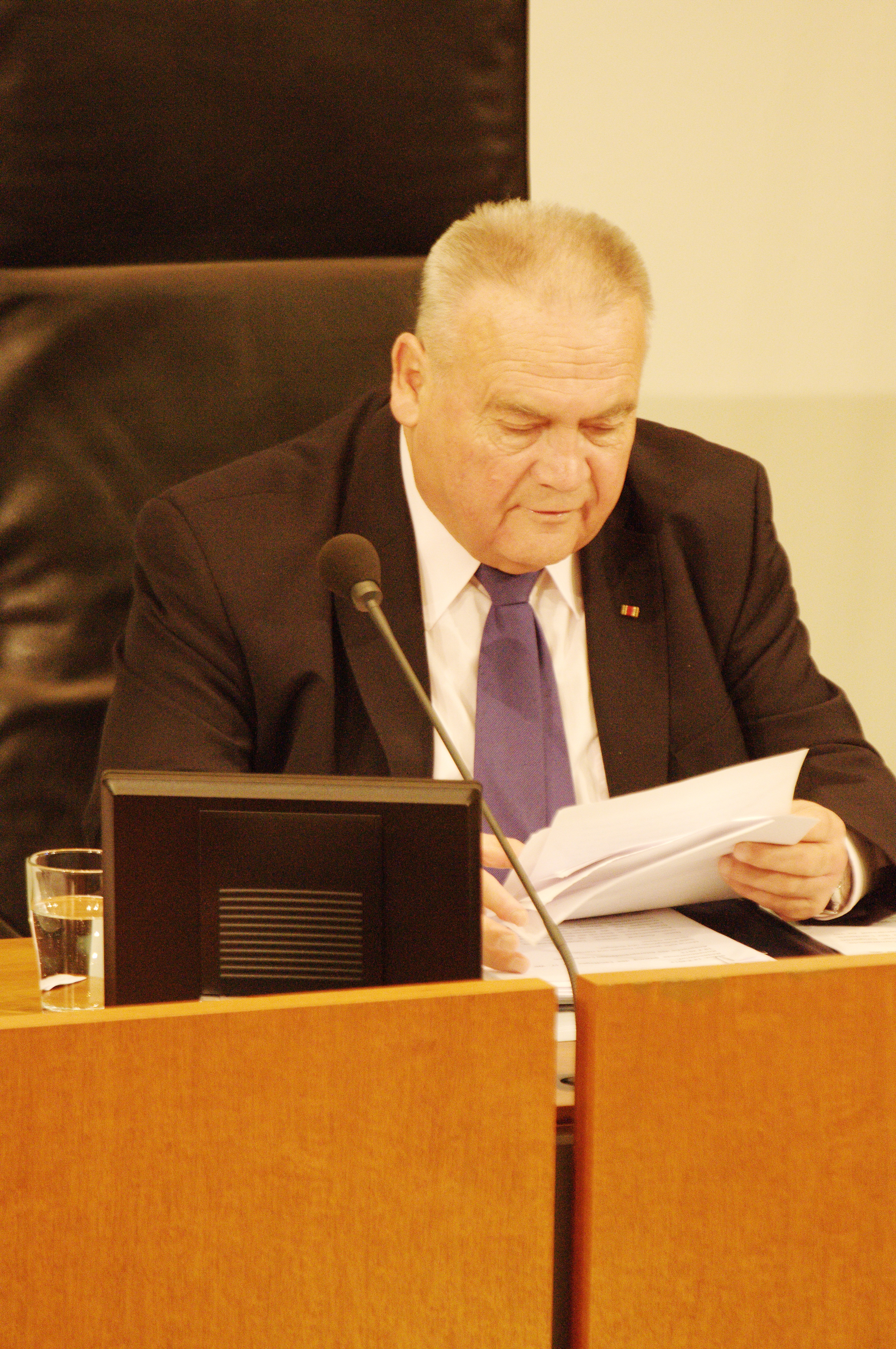
- Koch in 2013

Member of the Landtag of Lower Saxony
- In office 1994–2017

Personal details
- Born: 27 September 1939 Hilkerode, Germany
- Died: 6 September 2023 (aged 83)
- Party: CDU
- Education: University of Göttingen; Free University of Berlin

Lothar Koch (27 September 1939 – 6 September 2023) was a German politician. A member of the Christian Democratic Union, he served in the Landtag of Lower Saxony from 1994 to 2017.

Koch died on 6 September 2023, at the age of 83.
