= Hermann A. Schlögl =

German actor and Egyptologist (1937–2023)

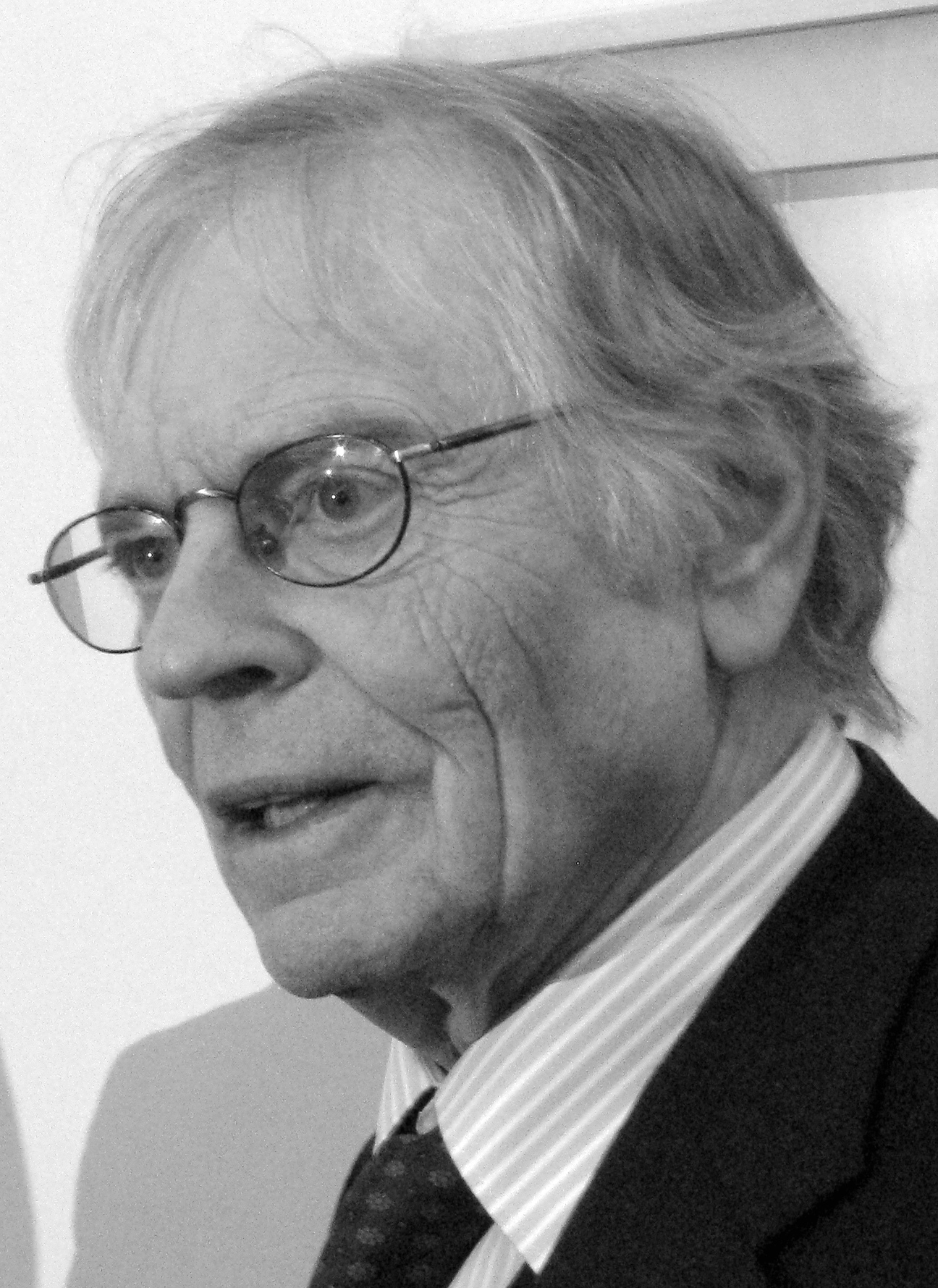
- Schlögl in 2010
- Born: Hermann Alexander Schlögl; 22 July 1932; Munich, Gau Munich-Upper Bavaria, Germany
- Died: 14 January 2023 (aged 90); Basel, Switzerland
- Education: LMU Munich; University of Basel
- Occupations: Actor; Egyptologist

Hermann Alexander Schlögl (22 July 1932 – 14 January 2023) was a German actor and Egyptologist.

== Biography ==
Born in Munich on 22 July 1932, Hermann was the youngest son of politician Alois Schlögl and the brother of historian Waldemar Schlögl. He studied literature and theatre at LMU Munich, while at the same time taking acting lessons. He started off as an actor at the Theater Ulm and at the Wuppertaler Bühnen. He also took on roles in film, such as in Andreas Voest, directed by Eberhard Itzenplitz.

Schlögl began studying Egyptology, archeology, and ancient history and graduated from the University of Basel in 1976 with the thesis Der Gott auf der Blüte. He directed the Swiss Bank Corporation's exhibition "Geschenk des Nils", which was shown at various museums across Switzerland for two years. He taught at the University of Fribourg from 1980 to 2000. He contributed to the Lexikon der Ägyptologie.

Schlögl died in Basel on 14 January 2023, at the age of 90.

== Publications ==
- Echnaton – Tutanchamun. Fakten und Texte (1983)
- Amenophis IV. Echnaton. Mit Selbstzeugnissen und Bilddokumenten (1986)
- Altägyptische Totenfiguren aus öffentlichen und privaten Sammlungen der Schweiz (1990)
- Uschebti. Arbeiter im Ägyptischen Totenreich (1993)
- Ramses II. Mit Selbstzeugnissen und Bilddokumenten (1993)
- Gärten der Liebe. Lyrik aus der Zeit der Pharaonen (2000)
- Corpus der ägyptischen Totenfiguren der öffentlichen Sammlungen Krakaus (2000)
- Der Teufel hole die Kunst. Briefe von Lesser Ury an einen Freund (2000)
- Das alte Ägypten (2003)
- Das thebanische Grab Nr. 136 und der Beginn der Amarna-Zeit (2005)
- Egipskie figurki grobowe (2006)
- Die Weisheit Ägyptens (2007)
- Echnaton (2008)
- Nofretete. Die Wahrheit über die schöne Königin (2012)
