= Corinna Werwigk-Hertneck =

German lawyer and politician (1952–2023)

Corinne Werwigk-Hertneck
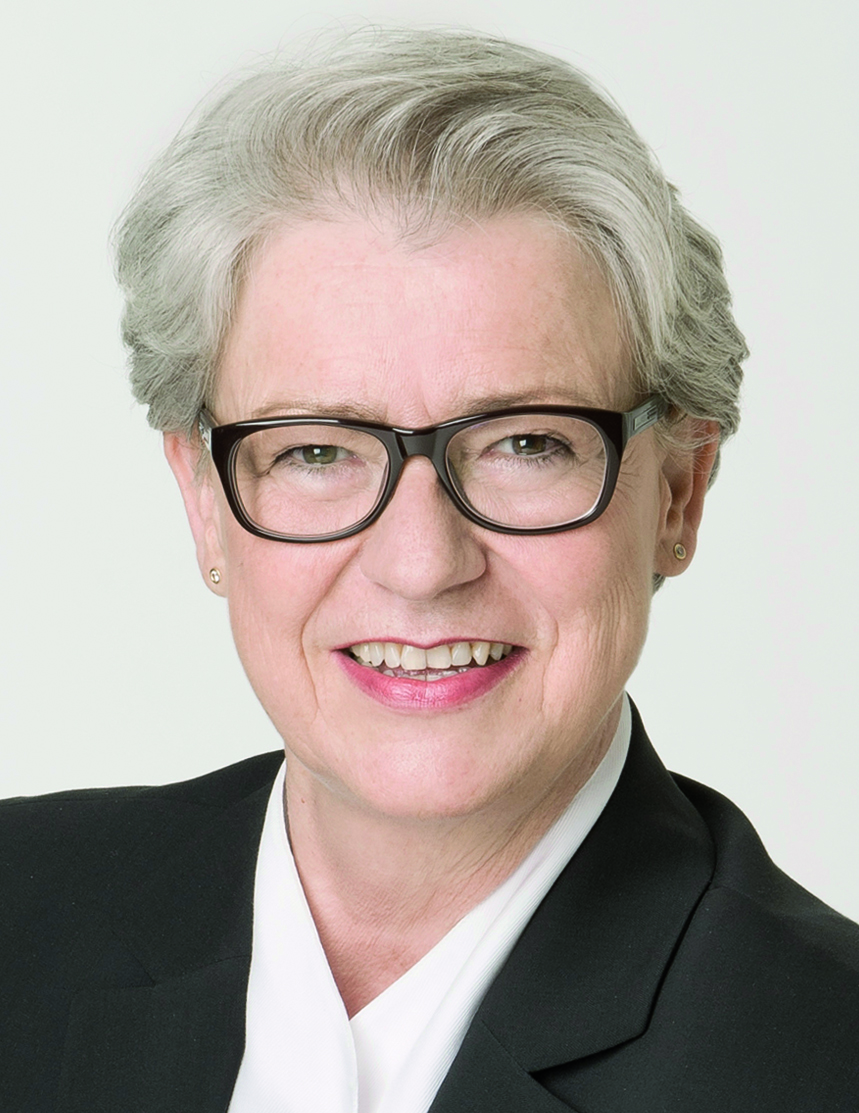
- Werwigk-Hertneck in 2012

Minister of Justice of Baden-Württemberg
- In office 2002 – 22 July 2004

Personal details
- Born: 23 November 1952 Stuttgart, Baden-Württemberg, West Germany
- Died: 5 September 2023 (aged 70) Stuttgart, Baden-Württemberg, Germany
- Party: FDP
- Occupation: Lawyer

Corinna Werwigk-Hertneck (23 November 1952 – 5 September 2023) was a German lawyer and politician. A member of the Free Democratic Party, she served as Minister of Justice of Baden-Württemberg from 2002 to 2004.

Werwigk-Hertneck died in Stuttgart on 5 September 2023, at the age of 70.
