= Copenhagen Architecture Festival x FILM =

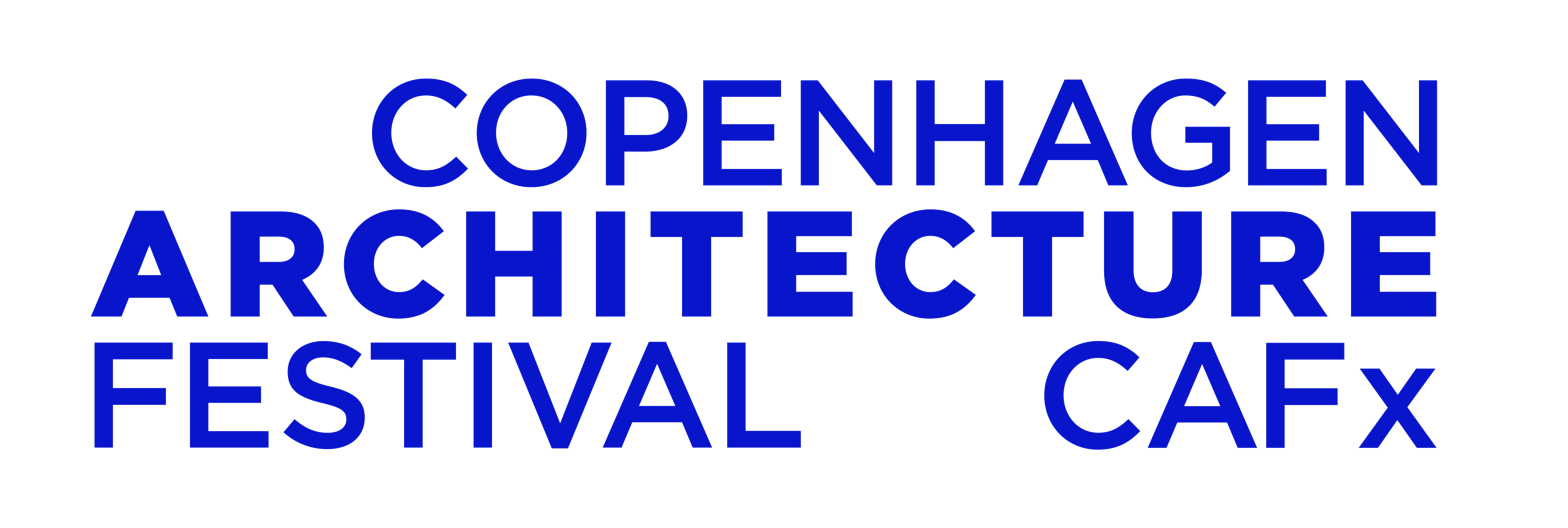

Copenhagen Architecture Festival (CAFx) was founded in 2014 in Copenhagen, Denmark at the initiative of Josephine Michau, Peter Møller Rasmussen and Mads Farsø. The title of the festival's first year (2014) was Copenhagen Architecture Festival x Film with a strong focus on the film medium. In 2015, the festival expanded to exhibitions, master classes and seminars as well to a further festival edition in Aarhus: Aarhus Architecture Festival (AAFx). The number of visitors doubled from 4.000 visitors in 2014 to 8.000 visitors in 2015.

Since then, the festival has grown in both scope and ambition. In 2016, the program covered more than 150 events, providing a wide range of approaches to architecture in three cities, as now the festival also runs in Aalborg: Aalborg Architecture Festival (ALAFx). Furthermore, the festival organized its first Summer School on Film and Architecture in August 2016 in Aarhus, inviting 6 architects and artists to run 3 masterclasses.

In 2017, all three festival editions CAFx, AAFx and ALAFx took place simultaneously under the headline "Architecture As Identity", which had a span of over 150 events. As well as last year, CAFx is organizing a Summer School on Film and Landscape, taking place in August 2017 on the Danish west coast of Lemvig.

The goal of the festival is to extend the idea of what architecture can be and how it seeps everywhere in human lives. All of the cities have a strong architectural identity and local ambassadors co-curating and conducting the program.

The festival is led by festival director Josephine Michau and strategic director Mads Farsø. The main supporters of the Festival are Realdania, Dreyers Fond, Københavns Kommune, Det Danske Filminstitut and Statens Kunstfond.
