= Stanislav Žalud =

Czech politician (1932–2023)

Member of the Federal Assembly of Czechoslovakia
- In office 27 June 1990 – 31 December 1992

Personal details
- Born: 22 February 1932 Přerov, Czechoslovakia
- Died: 14 November 2023 (aged 91)
- Party: OF; ODS
- Occupation: Architect

Stanislav Žalud (22 February 1932 – 14 November 2023) was a Czech architect and politician. A member of the Civic Forum and the Civic Democratic Party, he served in the Federal Assembly of Czechoslovakia from 1990 to 1992.

Žalud died on 14 November 2023, at the age of 91.
