= Matthias Carras =

German singer (1964–2023)

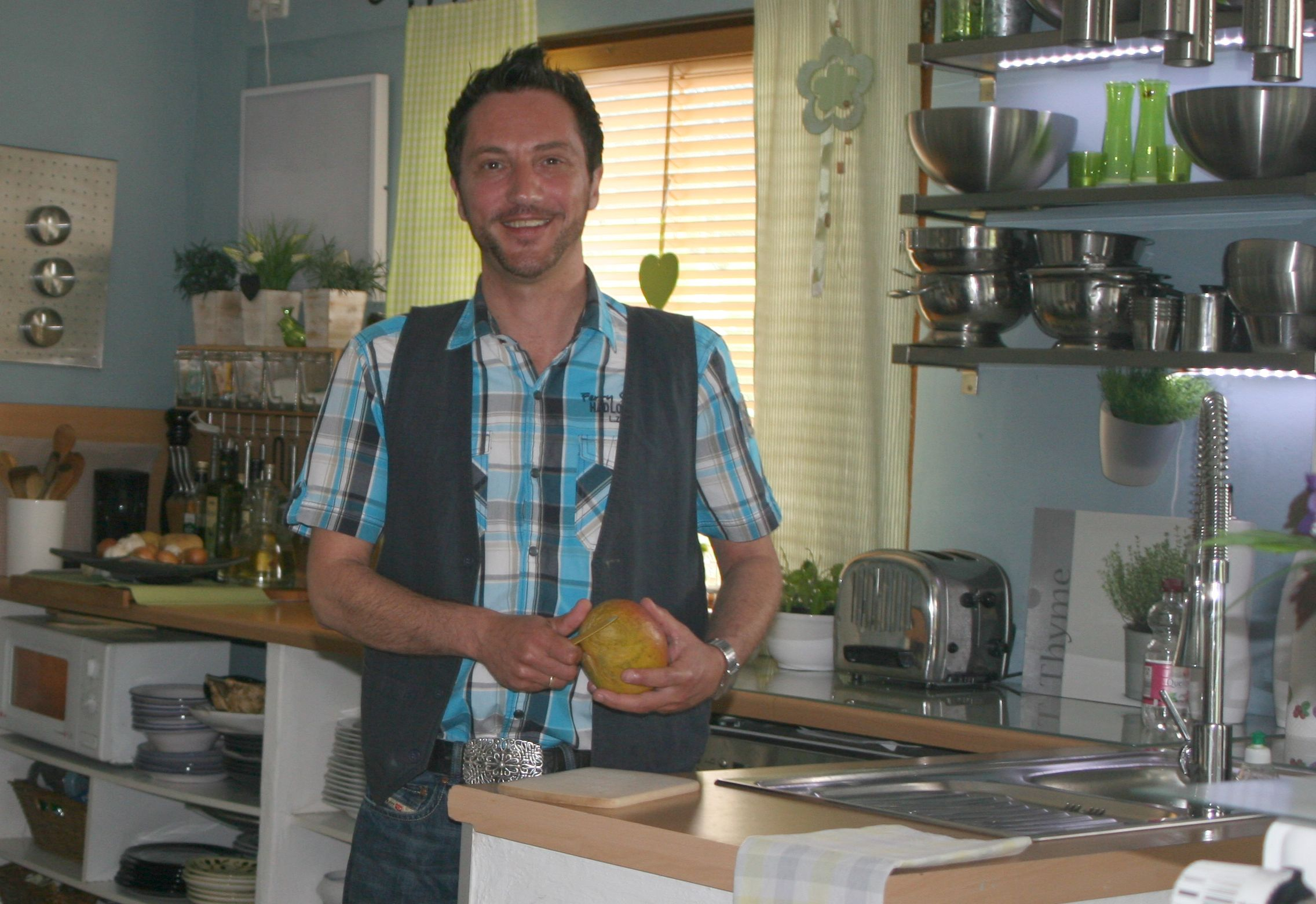
- Carras in 2012
- Born: Matthias Thomas Blöcher; 21 December 1964; Wehrda, Hesse, West Germany
- Died: 14 January 2023 (aged 58)
- Occupations: Singer; Disc jockey

Matthias Thomas Blöcher (21 December 1964 – 14 January 2023), known professionally as Matthias Carras, was a German pop singer, disc jockey, and television presenter.

== Biography ==
After training as a retail salesperson, Blöcher worked as a manager in a fashion house in Biedenkopf. He also worked as a disc jockey in a nightclub. In 1990, he began studio recordings and released his first single, titled Matthias Carras, the following year.

Blöcher achieved great success in 1998 with the singles Ich krieg nie genug von dir and Ich bin dein Co-Pilot and subsequently worked with producers Ronny Jentzsch and Hermann Niesig. From 2002 to 2004, he was a television presenter for a quiz show on 9Live and later on Super RTL.

In 2015, Blöcher ended his career due to chronic depression. However, other reasons for his departure included a change in the music industry. He then became a hairdresser and ran a barber shop in Biedenkopf for several years. However, he released a comeback album in April 2021 titled Endlich Frei.

In October 2020, Blöcher was diagnosed with cancer, of which he died on 14 January 2023, at the age of 58.

== Discography ==
=== Albums ===
- Bitte anschnallen (2000)
- Verliebt (2002)
- Zärtlicher Rebell (2004)
- Meine Besten (2005)
- …auch nur ein Mann (2007)
- Kein Typ wie früher (2009)
- Ansonsten geht’s mir gut (2011)
- Carrasmatisch (2013)
- Endlich Frei (2021)

=== Singles ===
- Mehr von dir (1991)
- Gib mir die Hitze der Nacht (1992)
- Mitten in der Nacht (1997)
- Voll erwischt (1998)
- Ich krieg’ nie genug von dir (1999)
- Ich bin dein Co-Pilot (1999)
- Ich surf auf Wolke 7 (2000)
- Du bist so süß, wenn du sauer bist (2000)
- S.O.S. Lara I’m in Love (2001)
- Ich lieg in der Sonne (2003)
- Ich will heute Nacht nicht alleine schlafen (2003)
- Wir sind endlich mal wieder alleine (2004)
- Heut’ Nacht (2009)
- Diva (2009)
- Du hast mich überzeugt (2021)

=== Compilations ===
- Meine Besten (2005)
- Megastark – Die Maxis (2010)
