= Randolf Stich =

German politician (1966–2023)

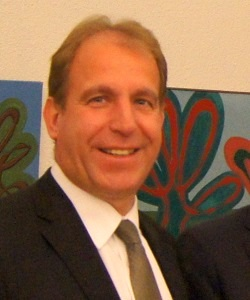
- Stich in 2015

Secretary of State of the Interior and Sport of Rhineland-Palatinate
- In office 2015–2022
- Preceded by: Günter Kern
- Succeeded by: Simone Schneider

Personal details
- Born: 20 February 1966 Neustadt an der Weinstraße, Rhineland-Palatinate, West Germany
- Died: 2 July 2023 (aged 57)
- Party: SPD
- Education: University of Mainz
- Occupation: Lawyer

Randolf Stich (20 February 1966 – 2 July 2023) was a German lawyer and politician. A member of the Social Democratic Party, he served as Secretary of State of the Interior and Sport of Rhineland-Palatinate from 2015 to 2022.

Stich died of cancer on 2 July 2023, at the age of 57.
