= Gerhard Moehring =

German local historian (1921–2023)

Gerhard Moehring (28 March 1921 – 29 January 2023) was a German schoolteacher, museum director, local historian and author.

== Life ==
Moehring was born in Lörrach to Gustav Moehring, a high school professor of classical philosophy. He completed his schooling at the Hebel-Gymnasium Lörrach in 1939. Moehring had to break off his studies in forestry at the University of Freiburg because he was called up for military service.

During the war with the Soviet Union, Moehring served in the 14th anti-tank company of the 436th Infantry Regiment (132nd Infantry Division), where he was promoted to company commander. He became a Soviet prisoner of war on May 9, 1945, one of 10,000 prisoners held by Josef Stalin as political leverage in the Cold War. It was not until Konrad Adenauer's intervention in 1955 that the prisoners including Moehring, returned home on October 18, 1955. Moehring's written testimony and belongings from his time captive are exhibited in the House of History, Stuttgart.

In 1956 Moehring studied at the University of Education in Freiburg, and began teaching in 1957, in Steinen. Between 1959 and 1967, he taught at the Fridolin School in Lörrach-Stetten, during which time he trained Ottmar Hitzfeld as a sports teacher. In 1967, Moehring moved to OberTüllingen to work for the Tüllinger Höhe youth welfare facility, becoming deputy headmaster in 1971.

Alongside teaching Moehring was director of the Museum am Burghof for 30 years, as well as helping with the preservation of historical monuments in Lörrach. Moehring was also deputy director of the Baden-Württemberg Museum Association. From 1961 onwards, he wrote articles on the history of Lörrach which featured in Badische Zeitung, the newspapers of the Jaumann publishing house, as well as the yearbook Unser Lörrach, which he edited with Walter Young. The index of authors of the journal of the Markgräflerland Historical Society, Das Markgräflerland, contains over 50 contributions by Moehring.

In January 2020 Gerhard Moehring received the Lisa Rees Medal of the City of Lörrach in recognition of his life's work. In addition, he was given honorary membership of the Rotary Club of Lörrach, and the Paul Harris Medal from Rotary International.

Moehring died on January 29, 2023, at the age of 101.

== Selected publications ==
- 1991ː Lörrach in alten Ansichten
- 2001ː Chronik Lörrach-Hauingen
- 2001ː 1250 Jahre Röttler Kirche, Band 1/2001 der Zeitschrift Das Markgräflerland herausgegeben vom Geschichtsverein Markgräflerland, Schopfheim, ISBN 3-932738-17-9 Digitalisat der UB Freiburg
- 2006ː Kleine Geschichte der Stadt Lörrach, G. Braun, Karlsruhe, ISBN 978-3-7650-8347-1 (2. Auflage: Der Kleine Buch Verlag, Karlsruhe, 2016, ISBN 978-3-7650-1422-2)
- 2007ː Geschichte der Juden in Lörrach, G. Braun, Leinfelden-Echterdingen, ISBN 978-3-7650-8347-1
