= Ingrid Olef =

German politician (1939–2023)

Member of the Landtag of Schleswig-Holstein
- In office 5 May 1992 – 23 April 1996

Personal details
- Born: Ingrid Schmidt; 14 October 1939 Dresden, Germany
- Died: 23 August 2023 (aged 83)
- Party: SPD

Ingrid Olef (née Schmidt; 14 October 1939 – 23 August 2023) was a German politician. A member of the Social Democratic Party, she served in the Landtag of Schleswig-Holstein from 1992 to 1996.

Olef died on 23 August 2023, at the age of 83.
