= 2023 Mercedes-Benz factory shooting =

Double killing in Sindelfingen, Germany

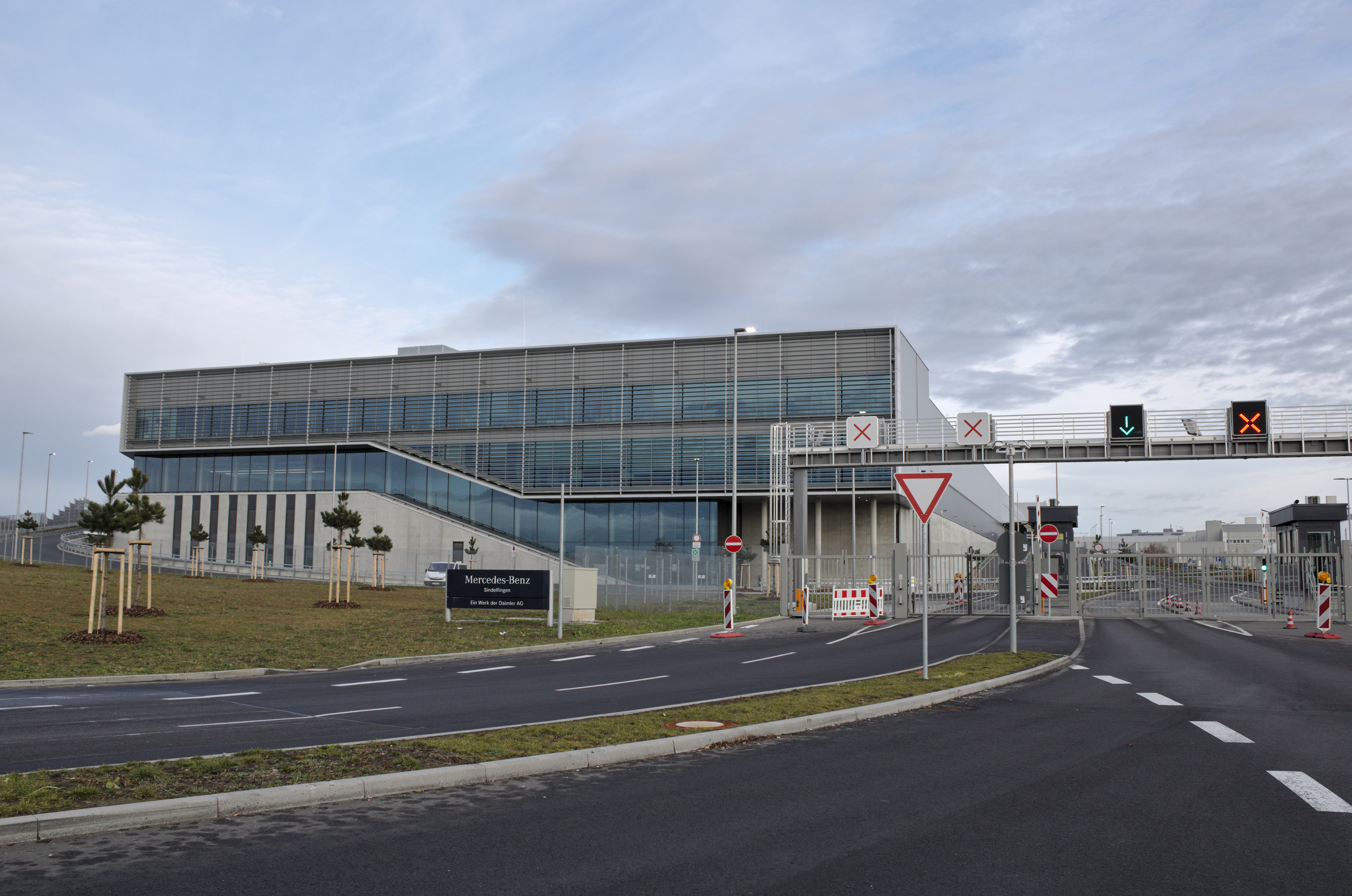
The Mercedes-Benz factory in Sindelfingen, in 2020.

On 11 May 2023, a man opened fire in a Mercedes-Benz factory in Sindelfingen, a city near Stuttgart, Germany, killing two people. The 53-year-old perpetrator was taken into custody. Police tweeted that there was no further danger to employees at the plant.

Reuters noted that the "incident was the latest of a number of mass shootings in Germany in recent years, many of which had a connection with extremism." The shooter and victims were Turkish nationals. No motive was established on the day of the shooting. The suspect later told the Stuttgart regional court that he was motivated "out of fear of being fired and because he had felt bullied at work". In December 2023, the perpetrator was sentenced to life in prison.
