= Katalin Nemes =

- Born: Katalin Frieder; 5 October 1915; Debrecen, Austria-Hungary
- Died: 29 March 1991 (aged 75); Budapest, Hungary
- Occupation: pianist
- Spouse: György Nemes
- Awards: Liszt Ferenc Award (1962), Excellent Worker of Education; 4 April Order; Order of the Work

Katalin Nemes (born Katalin Frieder; 5 October 1915 – 29 March 1991) was a pianist and teacher. She was the wife of the writer and journalist György Nemes and the mother of the literary translator Anna Nemes.

From the age of 10 she attended the conservatory of Debrecen as a student of Margit Halácsy. From 1932 to 1937 she attended Franz Liszt Academy of Music and was taught by Imre Stefániai, Béla Bartók and Imre Keéri-Szántó. During this period she had to play on piano in a band. After getting degree, she married György Nemes.

From 1947 to 1951, she taught at the National Conservatory in Budapest, which is today known as Béla Bartók Conservatory. At this time she returned to the academy as a demonstrator. Later she became a professor; her primary subject was related to piano.

At the same time she was a leader of concerts.

== Sources ==
- Brockhaus–Riemann zenei lexikon. Szerk. Boronkay Antal 2. köt. Budapest, 1984. Zeneműkiadó ISBN 9633305438
- Így láttuk Bartókot. Ötvennégy emlékezés. Szerk. Bónis Ferenc. Budapest, 1995. Püski K. ISBN 9638256532
- Ki kicsoda a magyar zeneéletben? Szerk. Székely András. 2. kiad. Budapest, 1988. Zeneműkiadó. ISBN 9633306728
- Az ő és férje oldala a Fővárosi Szabó Ervin Könyvtár honlapján
