= Hermann Brede =

German architect (1923–2023)

Hermann Brede (24 February 1923 – 13 December 2023) was a German architect. From 1972 to 1984, he was head of the Bremen branch of the Association of German Architects (BDA), of which he was a member from 1962 to 1986. Brede was co-creator of the BDA Architecture Prize. He died on 13 December 2023, at the age of 100.
