= Bodo Schümann =

German theologian and politician (1937–2023)

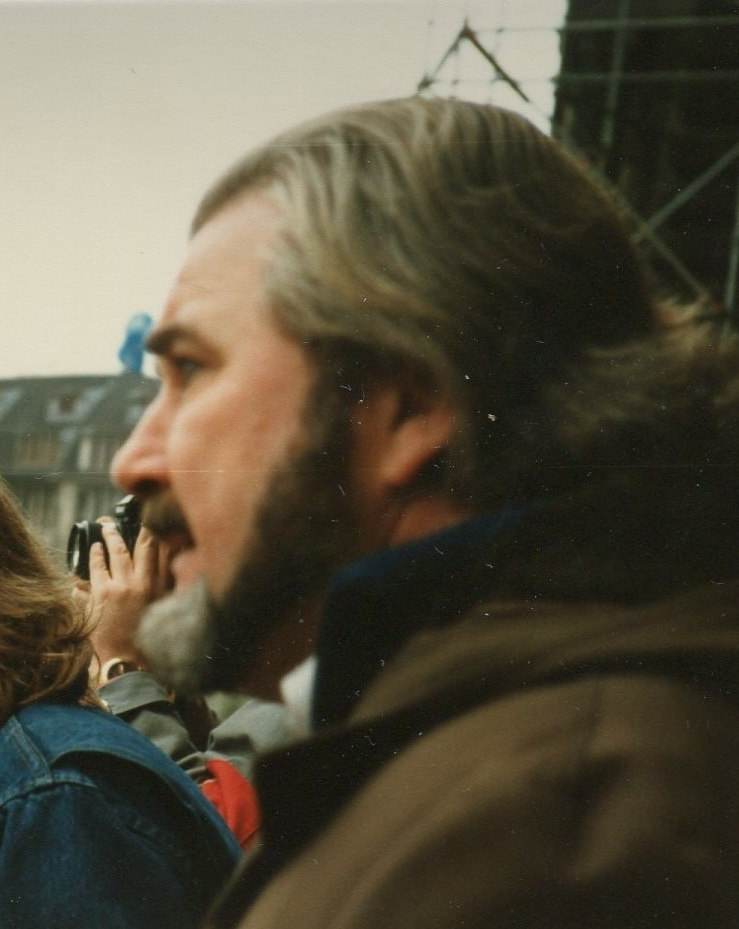
- Schümann in 1983

Member of the Hamburg Parliament
- In office 1974–1986

Personal details
- Born: 25 September 1937 Neumünster, Germany
- Died: 6 October 2023 (aged 86)
- Party: SPD
- Occupation: Theologian

Bodo Schümann (25 September 1937 – 6 October 2023) was a German theologian and politician. A member of the Social Democratic Party, he served in the Hamburg Parliament from 1974 to 1986.

Schümann died on 6 October 2023, at the age of 86.
