= Frieder Birzele =

German politician (1940–2023)

- Born: 17 January 1940; Göppingen, Germany
- Died: 25 December 2023 (aged 83)
- Political party: Social Democratic Party of Germany

Frieder Birzele (17 January 1940 – 25 December 2023) was a German politician from the Social Democratic Party of Germany. He was married and had two children. Birzele studied jurisprudence in Tübingen and Berlin from 1960 to 1965. He served as a member of the Landtag of Baden-Württemberg from 1976 to 2006 and was the minister of the interior of Baden-Württemberg from 1992 to 1996. Birzele died on 25 December 2023, at the age of 83.
