= 2023 deaths in the United Kingdom =

The following notable deaths of British people occurred in 2023. Names are reported under the date of death, in alphabetical order. A typical entry reports information in the following sequence:

- Name, age, citizenship at birth, nationality (in addition to British), or/and home nation, what subject was noted for, birth year, cause of death (if known), and reference.

== January ==
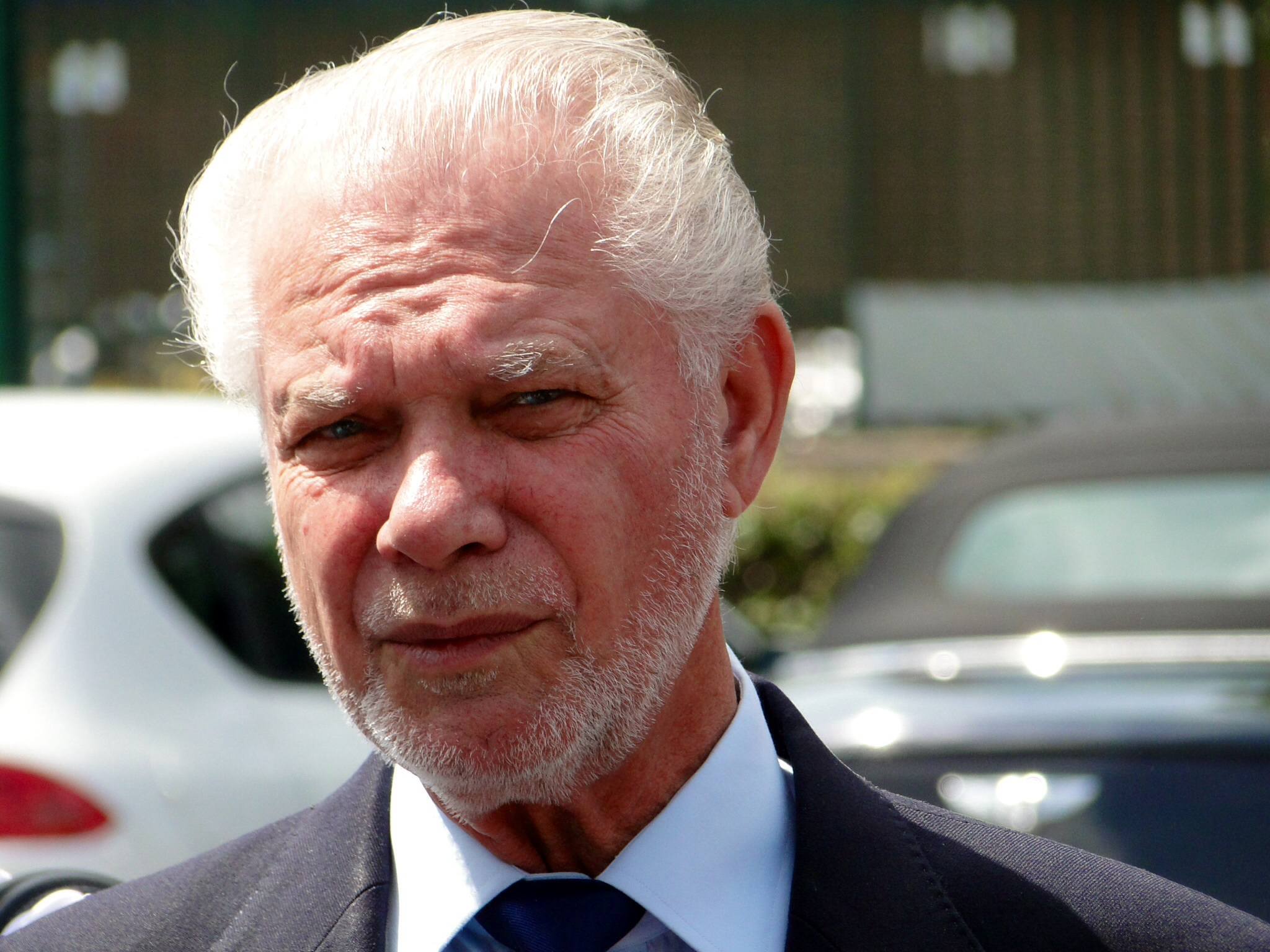
David Gold in 2014

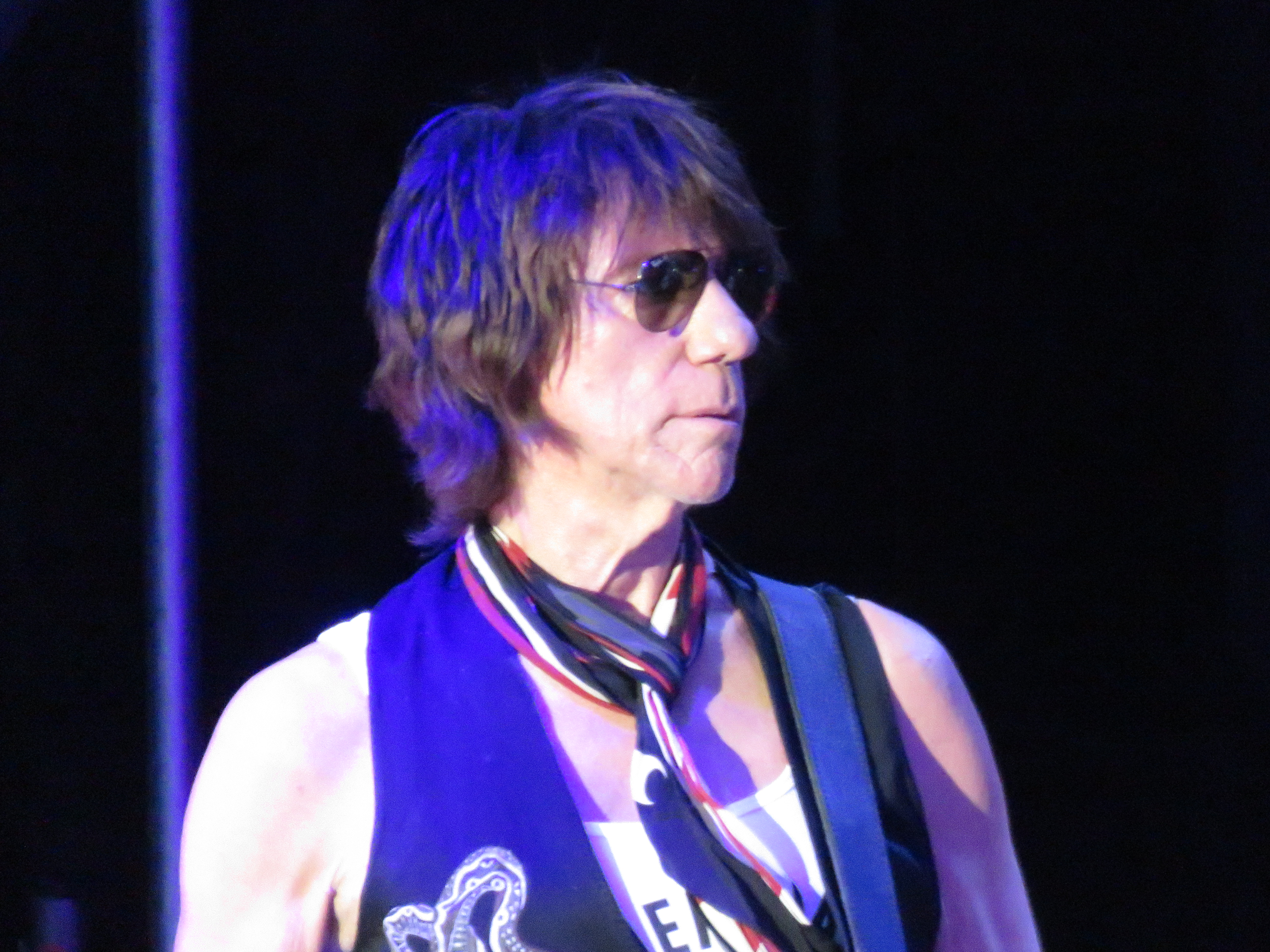
Jeff Beck in 2018

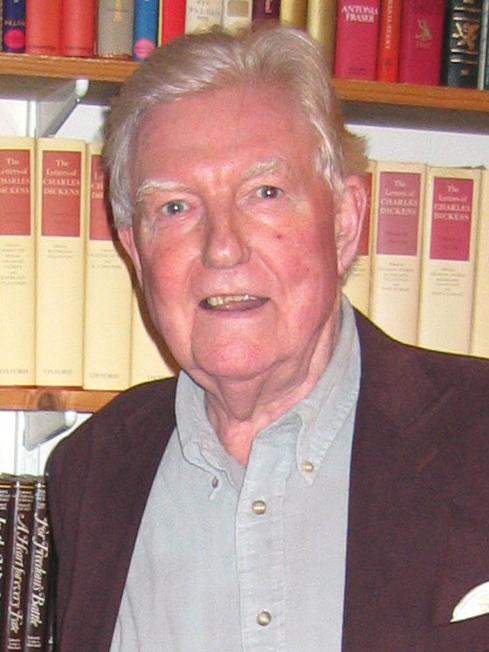
Paul Johnson in 2005

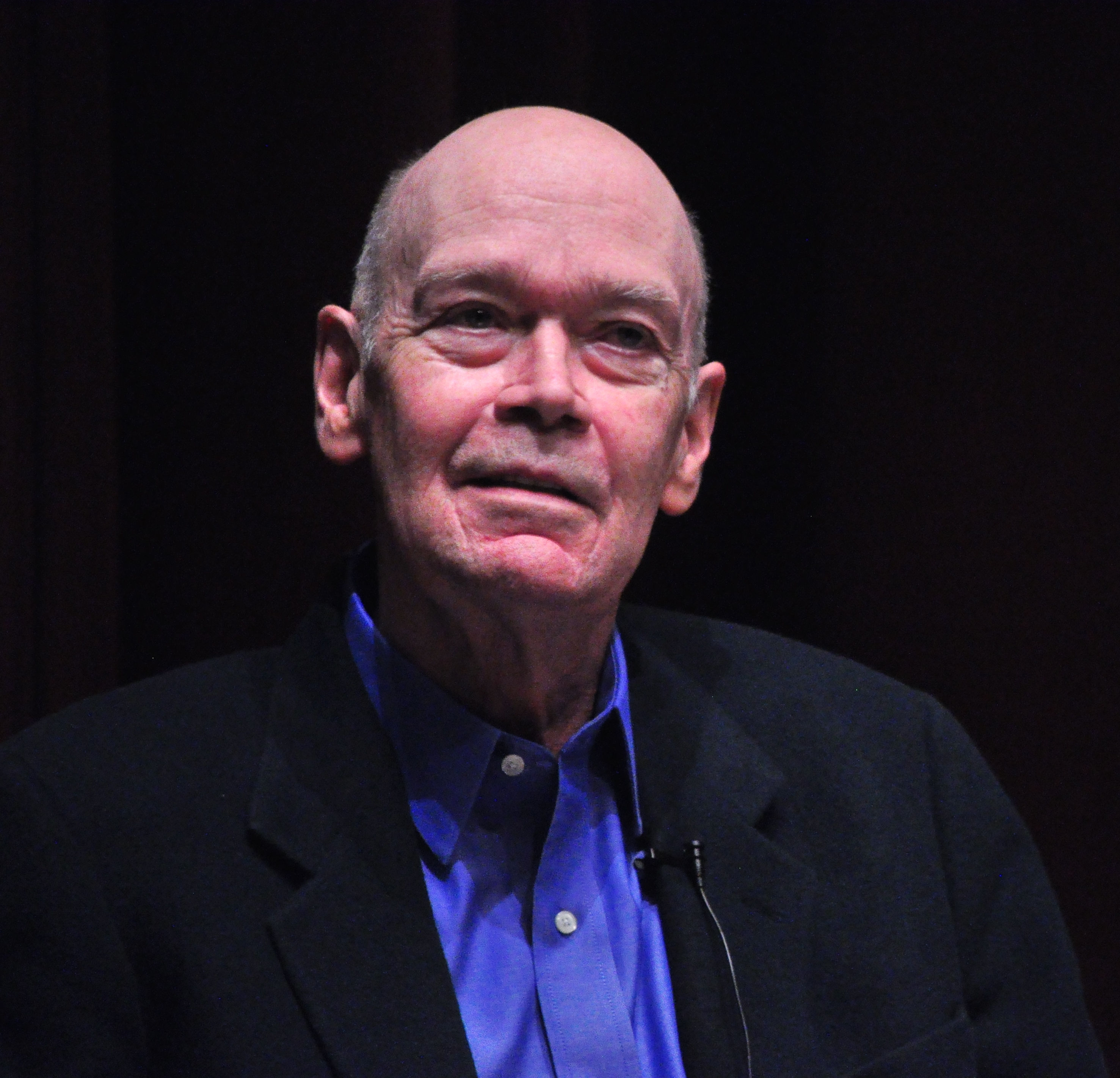
Jonathan Raban in 2013

- 1 January – Frank McGarvey, 66, Scottish footballer (St Mirren, Celtic, national team) (b. 1956), pancreatic cancer.
- 2 January – Andrew Downes, 72, English classical composer.
- 3 January
  - Roger Kean, British magazine publisher (Crash, Zzap!64), co-founder of Newsfield.
  - Alan Rankine, 64, Scottish musician (The Associates) (b. 1958) (death announced on this date)
- 4 January – Wyllie Longmore, 82, Jamanican-born British actor (Coronation Street, Love Actually), cancer.
- 5 January
  - Thomas Stonor, 7th Baron Camoys, 82, British banker and peer, lord chamberlain (1998–2000).
  - David Gold, 86, British retailer, publisher (Gold Star Publications), and football executive, chairman of West Ham United (since 2010).
  - Fay Weldon, 91, British author (The Life and Loves of a She-Devil, Puffball, The Cloning of Joanna May), essayist and playwright.
- 7 January – Ken Scotland, 86, Scottish rugby union player (Leicester Tigers, national team) and cricketer (national team), cancer.
- 8 January – Ray Middleton, 86, British Olympic racewalker (1964), respiratory failure.
- 9 January – David Duckham, 76, English rugby union player (Coventry, national team).
- 10 January
  - Jeff Beck, 78, English rock guitarist (The Yardbirds, The Jeff Beck Group, Beck, Bogert & Appice), bacterial meningitis.
  - Shirley Dynevor, 89, Welsh actress (Charlesworth, Rogue Male, The Wednesday Play).
- 11 January
  - Piers Haggard, 83, British film and television director (Pennies from Heaven, Quatermass, The Blood on Satan's Claw, The Fiendish Plot of Dr. Fu Manchu).
  - Eli Ostreicher, 39, British-born American serial entrepreneur, motorcycle accident in Thailand.
- 12 January
  - Paul Johnson, 94, British journalist, historian and author (Modern Times: A History of the World from the 1920s to the 1980s, A History of the American People, A History of Christianity).
  - Roy Pierpoint, 93, British racing driver, saloon car champion (1965).
- 13 January – Marc Worth, 61, British fashion executive, co-founder of WGSN, heart attack.
- 14 January
  - Alireza Akbari, 61, Iranian-British politician and convicted spy, execution by hanging. (death announced on this date)
  - Ronald Blythe, 100, English writer and columnist (Church Times).
  - John Wickham, 73, British motor racing team owner (Spirit Racing).
- 15 January – Bruce Gowers, 82, British television director (American Idol) and music video director ("Bohemian Rhapsody"), complications from acute respiratory infection.
- 16 January
  - John Bicourt, 77, British Olympic middle-distance runner (1972, 1976). (death announced on this date)
  - Brian Tufano, 83, English cinematographer (Trainspotting, A Life Less Ordinary, Billy Elliot).
- 17 January – Jonathan Raban, 80, British travel writer, critic, and novelist (Soft City, Waxwings, For Love & Money).
- 19 January
  - David Sutherland, 89, Scottish illustrator and comics artist (The Beano, Dennis the Menace and Gnasher, The Bash Street Kids).
  - Peter Thomas, 78, English-Irish footballer (Waterford, Ireland national team).
  - Anton Walkes, 25, English footballer (Portsmouth, Atlanta United, Charlotte FC), boat crash.
- 22 January – Ian Black, 69, British journalist (The Guardian), and author (Israel's Secret Wars), complications from frontotemporal lobar degeneration.
- 23 January – Fred Lindop, 84, British rugby league referee.
- 27 January – Sylvia Syms, 89, English actress (Peak Practice, EastEnders).
- 31 January – Alan Hurst, 77, British politician, MP for Braintree (1997–2005).

== February ==
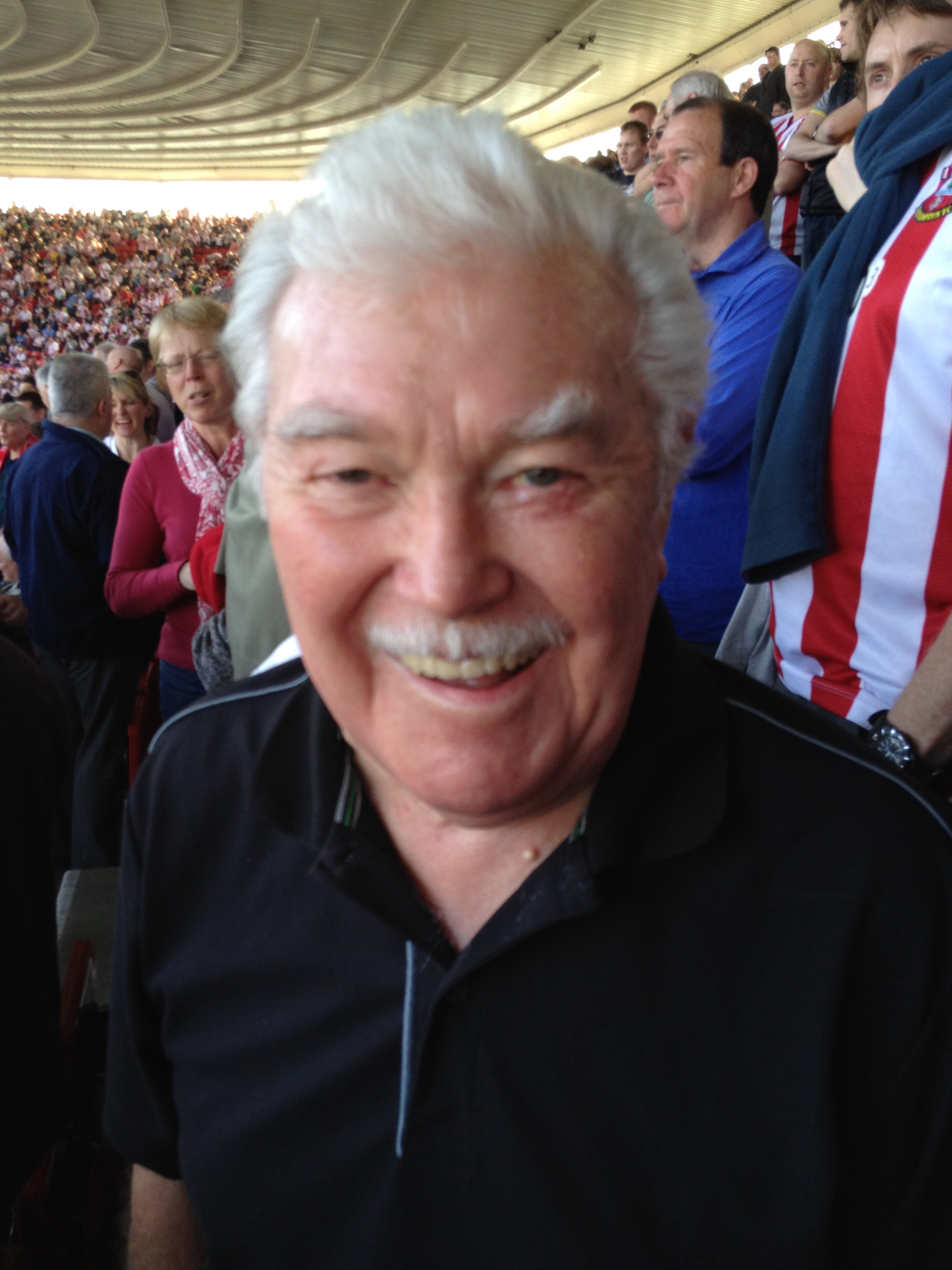
Dickie Davies in 2012

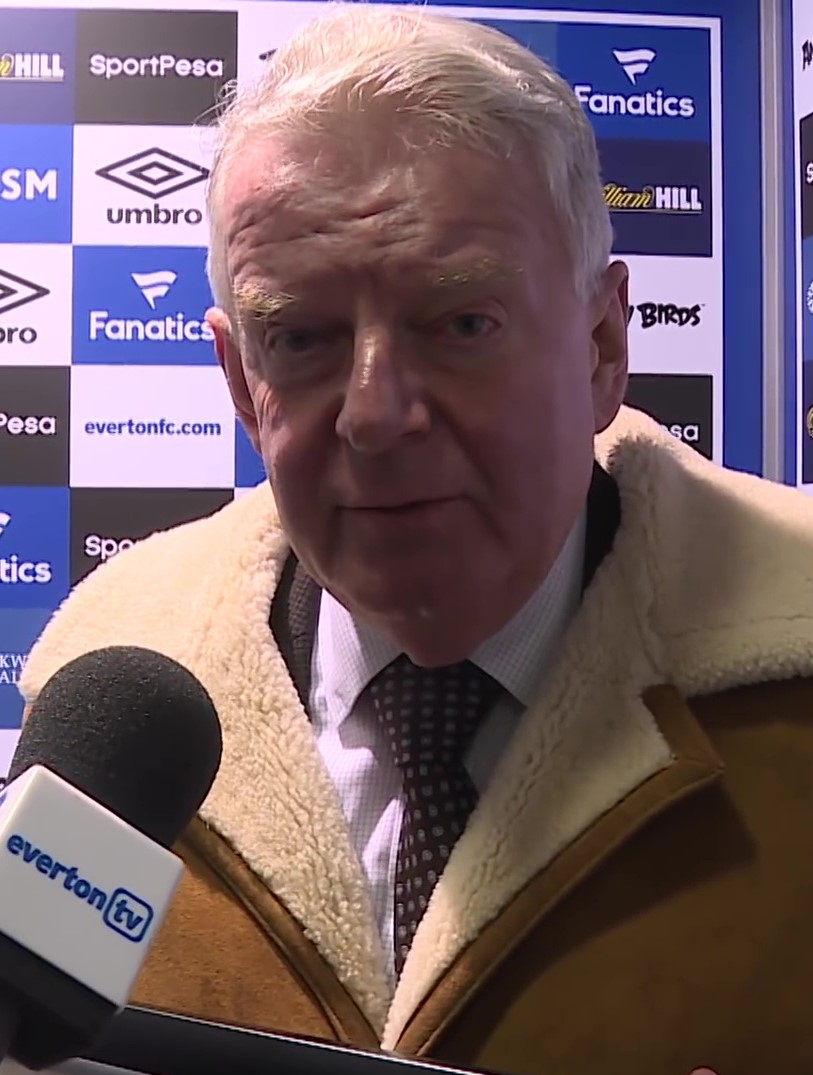
John Motson in 2018

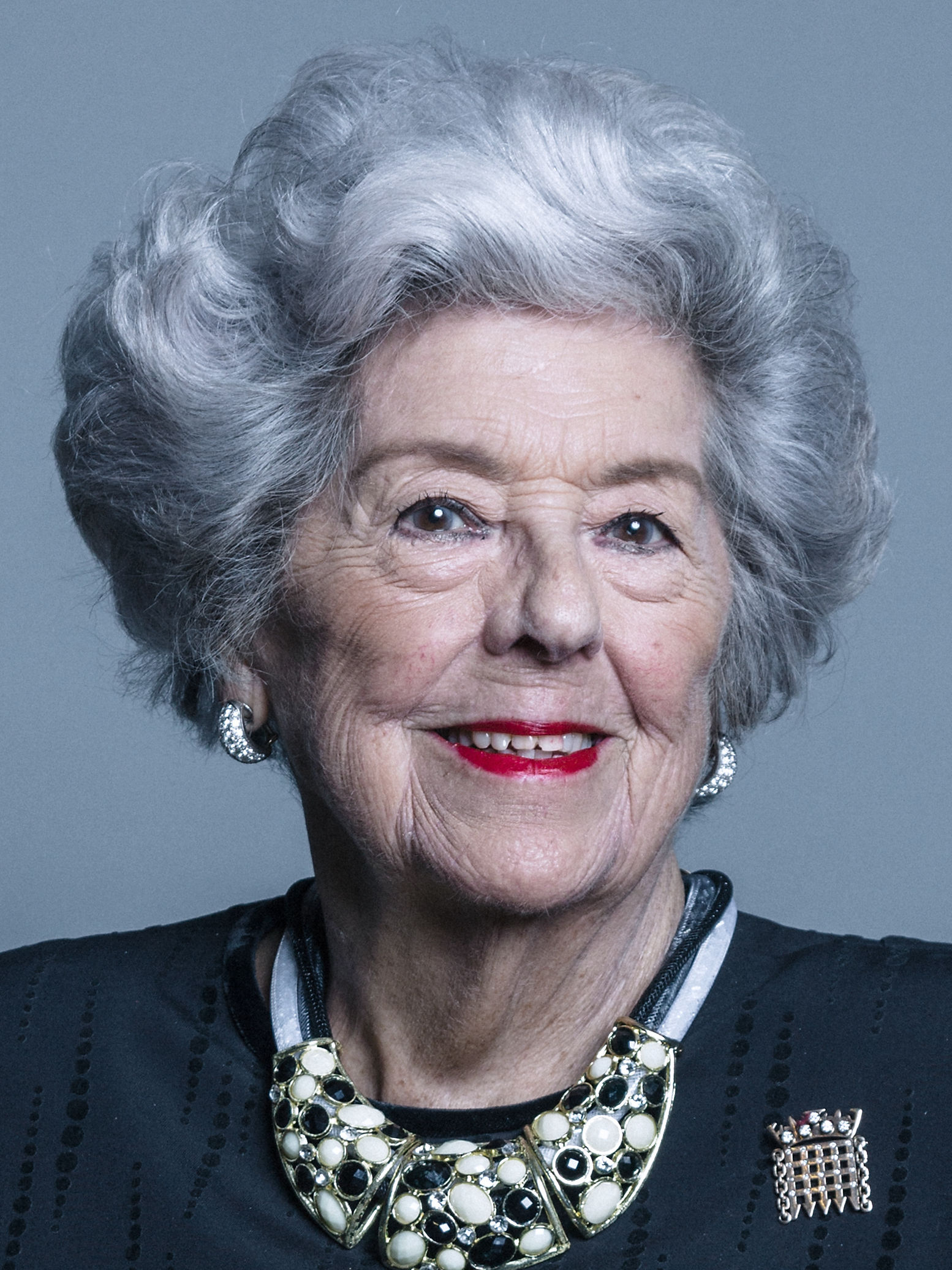
Betty Boothroyd in 2018

- 2 February – Tim Quy, 61, British musician (Cardiacs).
- 3 February – Robert Key, 77, English politician, Minister for Sport (1992–1993).
- 5 February
  - Hilary Alexander, 77, New Zealand-born British fashion journalist (The Daily Telegraph).
  - Robin Cocks, 84, British geologist.
  - Phil Spalding, 65, English bassist, session musician.
- 6 February
  - Peter Allen, 76, English footballer (Leyton Orient, Millwall).
  - Janet Anderson, 73, British politician, Minister for Film, Tourism and Broadcasting (1998–2001).
  - Billy Thomson, 64, Scottish footballer (Partick Thistle, St Mirren, Dundee United, Clydebank, Motherwell, Rangers, Dundee, Scotland).
- 7 February – Royden Wood, 92, English footballer (Leeds United).
- 9 February – Dennis Lotis, 97, South African-born British singer and actor (It's a Wonderful World, The City of the Dead, What Every Woman Wants).
- 10 February – Hugh Hudson, 86, English film director (Chariots of Fire, Greystoke: The Legend of Tarzan, Lord of the Apes, Revolution).
- 12 February – Tony Lee, 75, English footballer (Bradford City, Darlington).
- 13 February
  - Zia Mohyeddin, 91, British-Pakistani actor (Lawrence of Arabia, Immaculate Conception).
  - Oliver Wood, 80, British cinematographer (Die Hard 2, Face/Off, The Bourne Identity).
- 14 February – Christine Pritchard, 79, Welsh actress (Pobol y Cwm, Cara Fi).
- 16 February
  - Kevin Bird, 70, English professional footballer (Mansfield Town, Huddersfield Town).
  - Colin Dobson, 82, English professional footballer (Sheffield Wednesday, Huddersfield Town, Bristol Rovers).
- 17 February – Lee Whitlock, 54, British actor (Shine On Harvey Moon, Cassandra's Dream, Sweeney Todd: The Demon Barber of Fleet Street).
- 19 February
  - Dickie Davies, 94, British television sports presenter (World of Sport).
  - Henry McDonald, 57, Northern Irish writer and journalist (The Guardian, The Observer).
- 22 February – Philip Ziegler, 93, British biographer and historian.
- 23 February
  - John Motson, 77, English football commentator (BBC Sport).
  - Irving Wardle, 93, English theatre critic and writer.
- 24 February – Sir Bernard Ingham, 90, British journalist and civil servant, Downing Street press secretary (1979–1990).
- 25 February – Sir David Lumsden, 94, British musician and choirmaster.
- 26 February
  - Betty Boothroyd, Baroness Boothroyd, 93, British politician, first woman Speaker of the House of Commons (1992–2000).
  - Jim Lewis, 88, racehorse owner (Best Mate).
- 27 February
  - Tom McLeish, 60, British theoretical physicist.
  - Sammy Winston, 44, English footballer (Leyton Orient).

== March ==
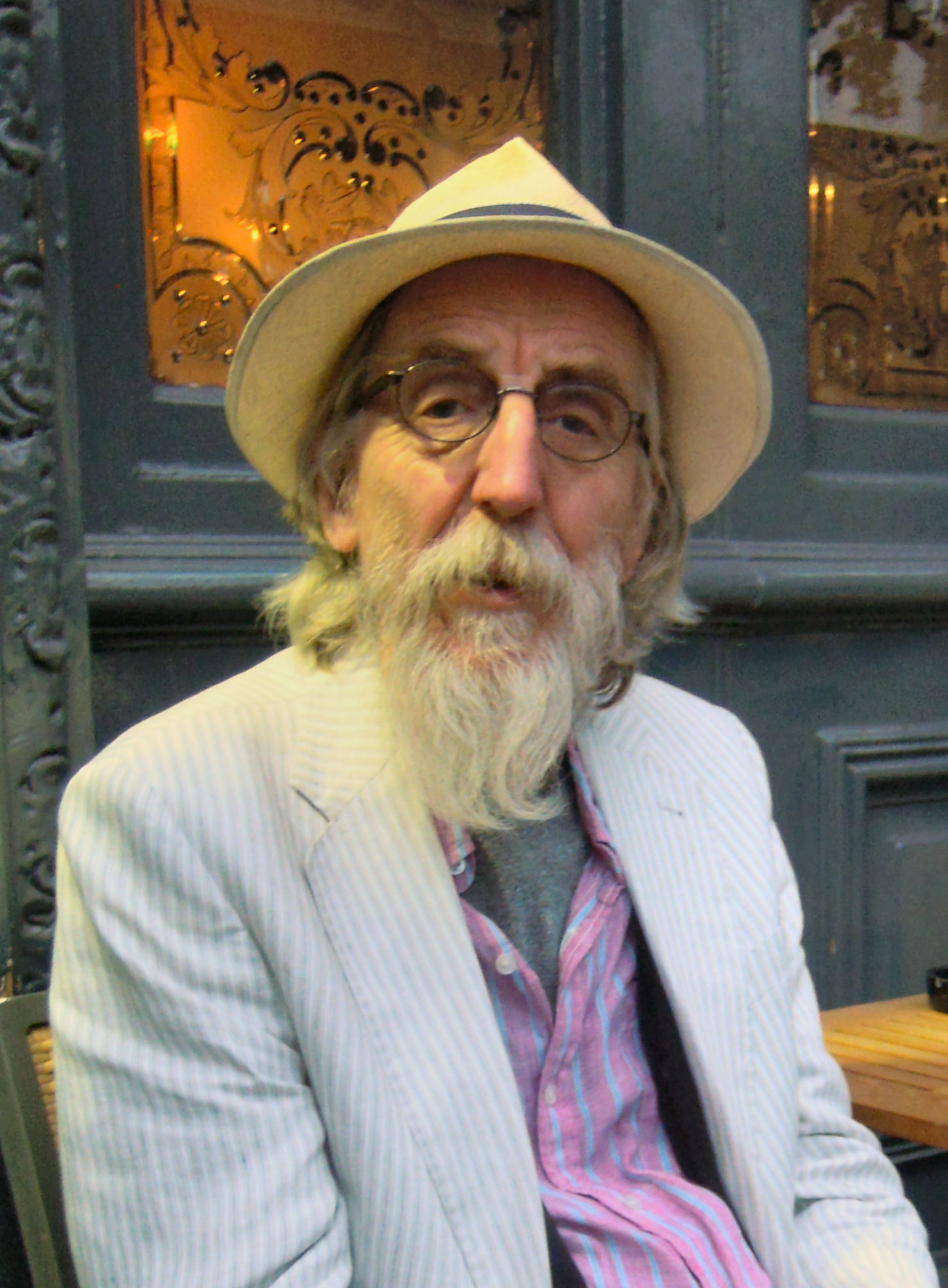
Bob Goody in 2015

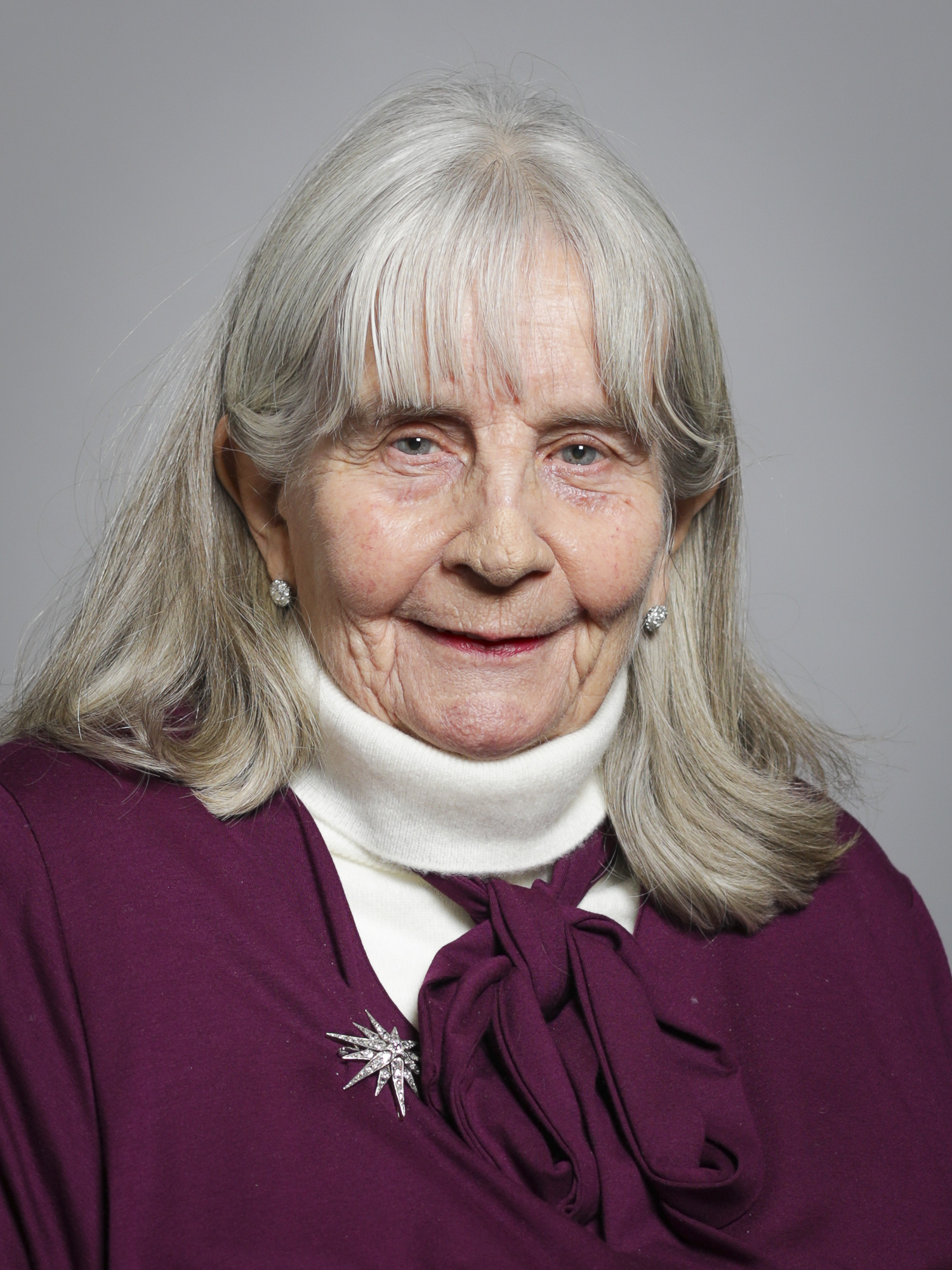
Susan Cunliffe-Lister, Baroness Masham of Ilton in 2019

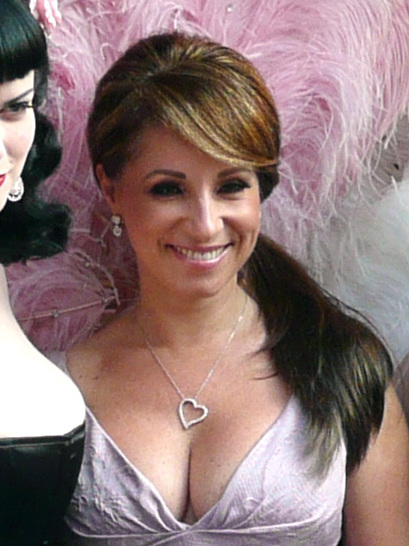
Jacqueline Gold in 2008

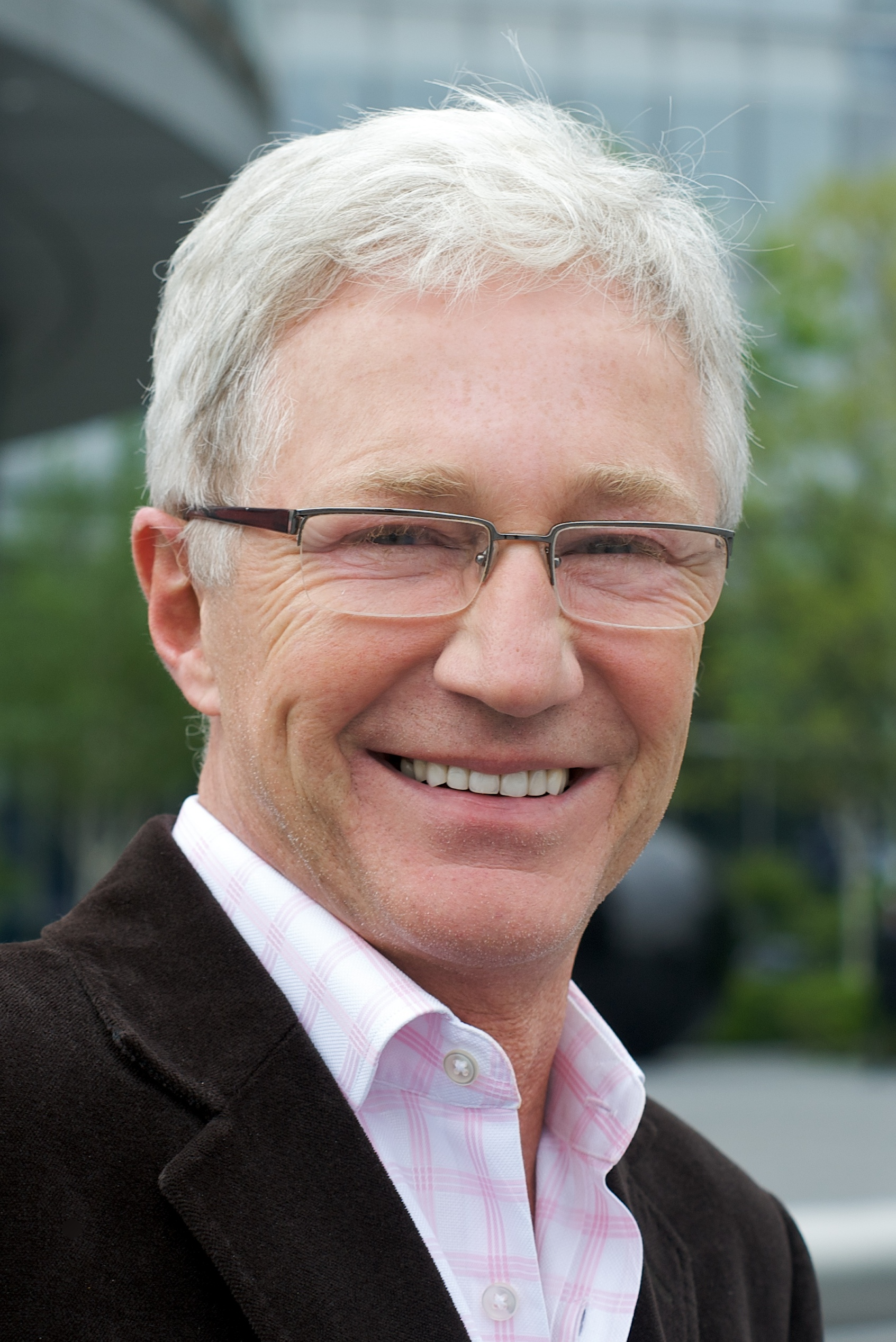
Paul O'Grady in 2009

- 1 March – Allan McGraw, 83, Scottish football player (Morton, Hibernian) and manager.
- 2 March – Steve Mackey, 56, English bassist, producer (Pulp).
- 3 March
  - Edwin A. Dawes, 97, British biochemist and magician.
  - Christopher Fowler, 69, English novelist.
  - Rita O'Hare, 80, Northern Irish political activist.
- 5 March – Bob Goody, 71, British actor and writer (Smith and Goody, The Cook, the Thief, His Wife & Her Lover, Blue Heaven, The Borrowers).
- 6 March – Bob Evered, 84, key player in the National Trust's purchase of Tyntesfield
- 9 March – Mystic Meg, 80, British astrologer.
- 11 March – Bill Tidy, 89, British cartoonist (The Cloggies, The Fosdyke Saga).
- 12 March
  - Dame Phyllida Barlow, 78, British visual artist.
  - Isabel Colegate, 91, British author (The Shooting Party) and literary agent.
  - Susan Cunliffe-Lister, Baroness Masham of Ilton, 87, British politician, member of the House of Lords (since 1970) and Paralympic champion (1960, 1964).
- 13 March
  - Simon Emmerson, 67, English record producer, guitarist, DJ, musical director, founder of (Afro Celt Sound System).
  - Alan Jones, 77, Welsh footballer (Swansea City, Hereford United, Southport).
- 14 March – Chris Shevlane, 80, Scottish footballer (Hearts, Celtic, Hibernian, Morton).
- 16 March
  - Tony Coe, 88, English jazz musician.
  - Patrick French, 57, British writer and historian (Tibet, Tibet, The World Is What It Is).
  - Jacqueline Gold, 62, British businesswoman (Ann Summers).
  - Melanie McFadyean, 72, British journalist.
  - Don Megson, 86, English footballer (Sheffield Wednesday, Bristol Rovers) and manager (Bristol Rovers, Bournemouth).
- 17 March – Sir Paul Girolami, 97, Italian-born British pharmaceutical executive, chairman of Glaxo (1985–1994).
- 18 March
  - Robert Lindsay, 29th Earl of Crawford, 96, Scottish peer, MP (1955–1974), member of the House of Lords (1974–2019) and Minister of State for Defence (1970–1972).
  - Sir James Dunbar-Nasmith, 96, British conservation architect (Sunninghill Park, Balmoral Estate).
- 20 March – Paul Grant, 56, British actor (Return of the Jedi, Labyrinth, The Dead) and stuntman.
- 21 March
  - Willie Bell, 85, Scottish footballer (Leeds United, Scotland) and manager (Birmingham City).
  - Eric Brown, 62, British science fiction writer.
  - Alexander Cameron, 59, British barrister, brother of David Cameron.
  - John Smith, Baron Kirkhill, 92, Scottish peer, Lord Provost of Aberdeen (1971–1975), Minister of State for Scotland (1975–1978) and member of the House of Lords (1975–2018).
- 24 March – Christopher Gunning, 78, English composer (La Vie en rose, Agatha Christie's Poirot, Middlemarch).
- 25 March – Nick Lloyd Webber, 43, English composer (Love, Lies and Records, Fat Friends The Musical, The Last Bus) and record producer, son of Andrew Lloyd Webber.
- 26 March – D. M. Thomas, 88, British poet, translator and novelist (The Flute-Player, The White Hotel).
- 28 March – Paul O'Grady, 67, English comedian and television presenter (The Paul O'Grady Show, Paul O'Grady Live, Paul O'Grady: For the Love of Dogs).
- 30 March – Peter Usborne, 85, British publisher, co-founder of Private Eye and founder of Usborne Publishing.

== April ==
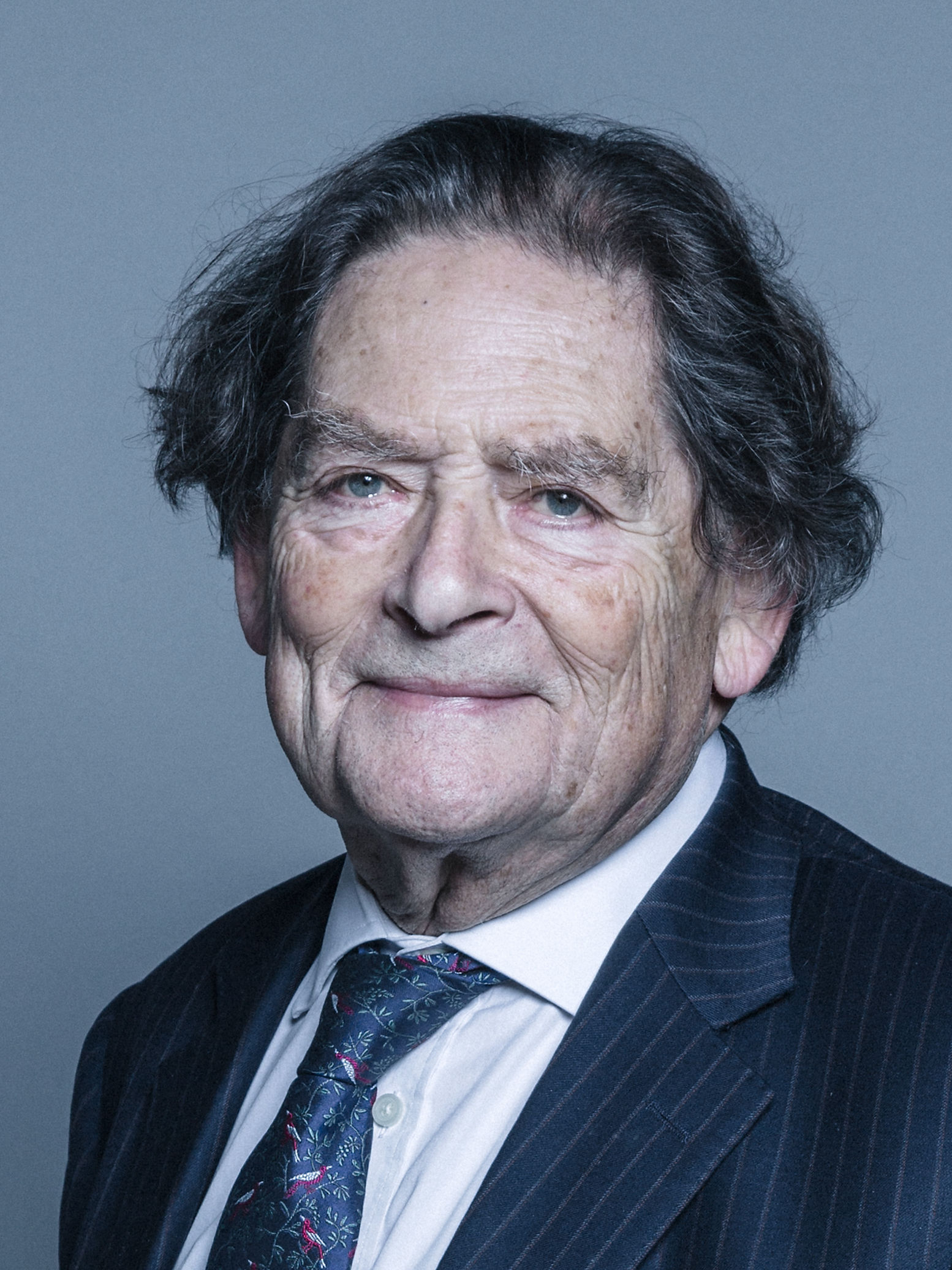
Nigel Lawson, Baron Lawson of Blaby in 2018

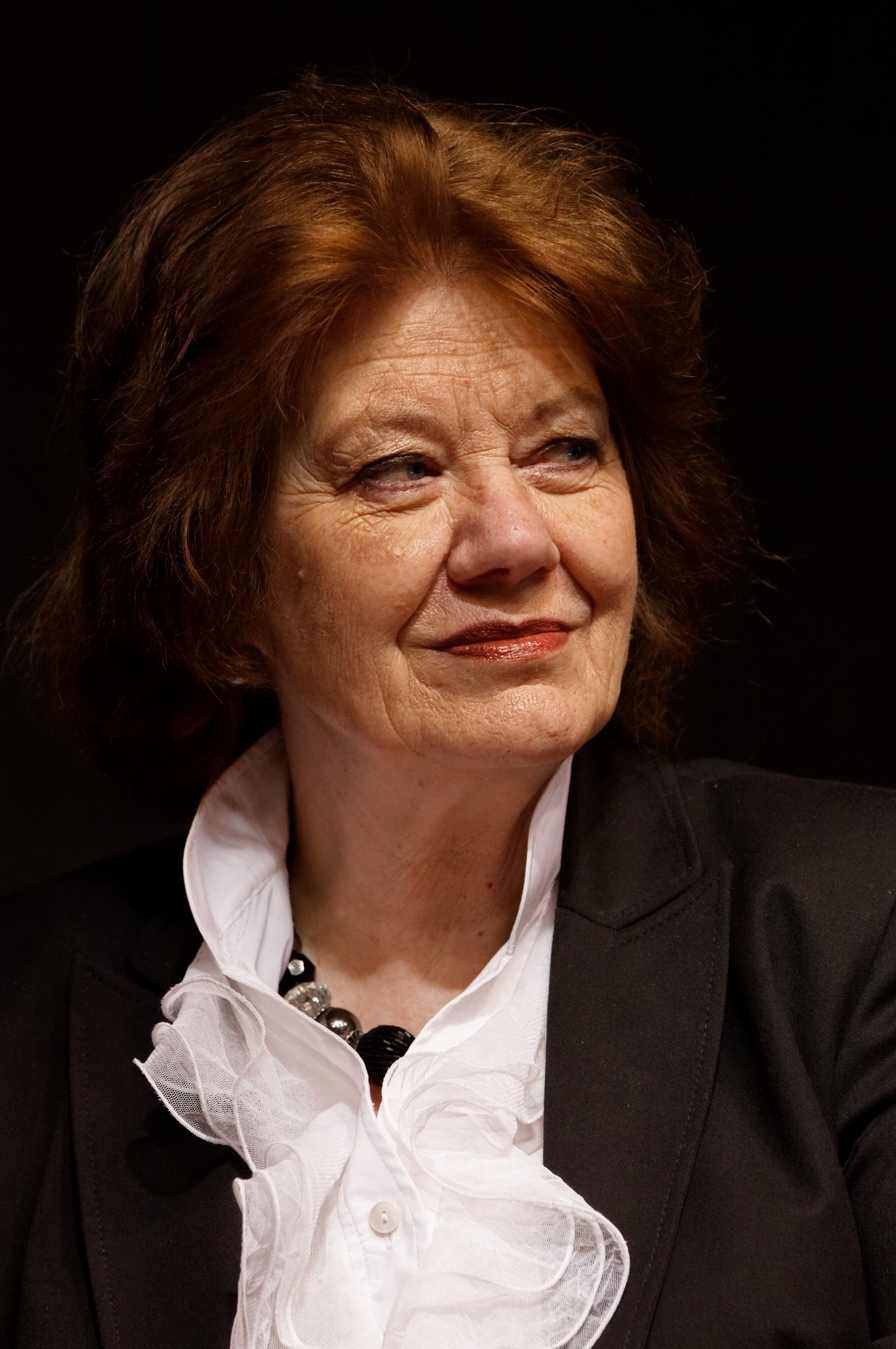
Anne Perry in 2012

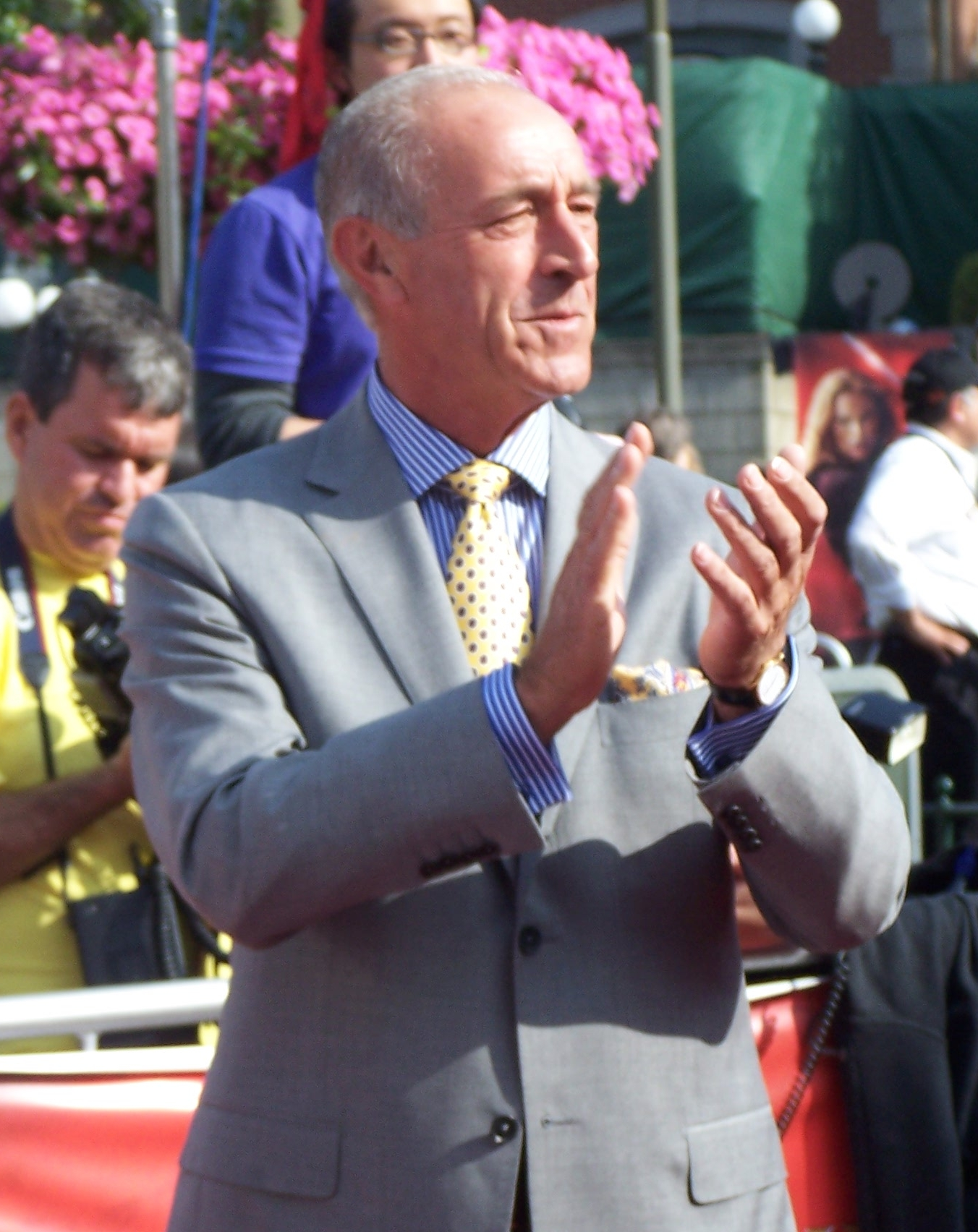
Len Goodman in 2007

- 1 April – Ken Buchanan, 77, Scottish boxer, undisputed world lightweight champion (1971).
- 2 April – Max Crabtree, 90, English professional wrestler and promoter (Joint Promotions).
- 3 April
  - Nigel Lawson, Baron Lawson of Blaby, 91, British politician, Chancellor of the Exchequer (1983–1989).
  - Michael Roberts, 75, British fashion journalist.
- 4 April – John Sainty, 76, English professional footballer (Reading, Bournemouth, Aldershot) and manager (Chester City).
- 6 April
  - Paul Cattermole, 46, English singer and actor (S Club 7).
  - Nicola Heywood-Thomas, 67, Welsh broadcaster and newsreader.
  - Norman Reynolds, 89, British production designer (Star Wars, Raiders of the Lost Ark, Empire of the Sun), Oscar winner (1978, 1982).
- 7 April
  - Ian Bairnson, 69, Scottish musician, multi-instrumentalist (Alan Parsons Project, Pilot, guitarist for Kate Bush).
  - Gareth Richards, 43, British comedian and radio presenter.
- 8 April
  - Deborah Brown, 95, Northern Irish sculptor.
  - Bob Heatlie, 76, Scottish songwriter ("Japanese Boy", "Cry Just a Little Bit", "Merry Christmas Everyone") and record producer.
  - Kenneth McAlpine, 102, English racing driver.
  - Judith Miller, 71, British antiques expert and broadcaster (Antiques Roadshow).
- 9 April – Andrew Phillips, Baron Phillips of Sudbury, 84, British solicitor and politician.
- 10 April – Anne Perry, 84, British crime writer (The Cater Street Hangman).
- 12 April – Bryn Parry, 66, British cartoonist and charity worker, co-founder of Help for Heroes.
- 13 April
  - Willie Callaghan, 56, Scottish professional footballer.
  - Mary Quant, 93, British fashion designer.
- 14 April
  - Murray Melvin, 90, English actor (Alfie, Lisztomania, Barry Lyndon).
  - Mark Sheehan, 46, Irish guitarist, singer-songwriter (The Script, Mytown).
- 16 April – Eddie Colquhoun, 78, Scottish footballer (Scotland, Bury, West Bromwich Albion, Sheffield United).
- 19 April – Peter Martin, 81, English actor (The Royle Family, Emmerdale).
- 21 April
  - Kate Saunders, 62, English actress and journalist (Angels, Only Fools and Horses, Have I Got News For You).
  - Mark Stewart, 62, musician (The Pop Group).
- 22 April
  - Len Goodman, 78, English ballroom dancer and coach (Strictly Come Dancing, Dancing with the Stars).
  - Barry Humphries, 89, Australian comedian, actor and author (Dame Edna Everage, Bedazzled, Finding Nemo).
- 27 April
  - Wee Willie Harris, 90, English singer, musician.
  - Jerry Springer, 79, British-born American talk show presenter (The Springer Show, Jerry Springer).
  - Barbara Young, 92, English actress (Coronation Street, I, Claudius, Last of the Summer Wine).
- 30 April – Elizabeth Scott, Duchess of Buccleuch, 68, Scottish peeress and philanthropist.

== May ==
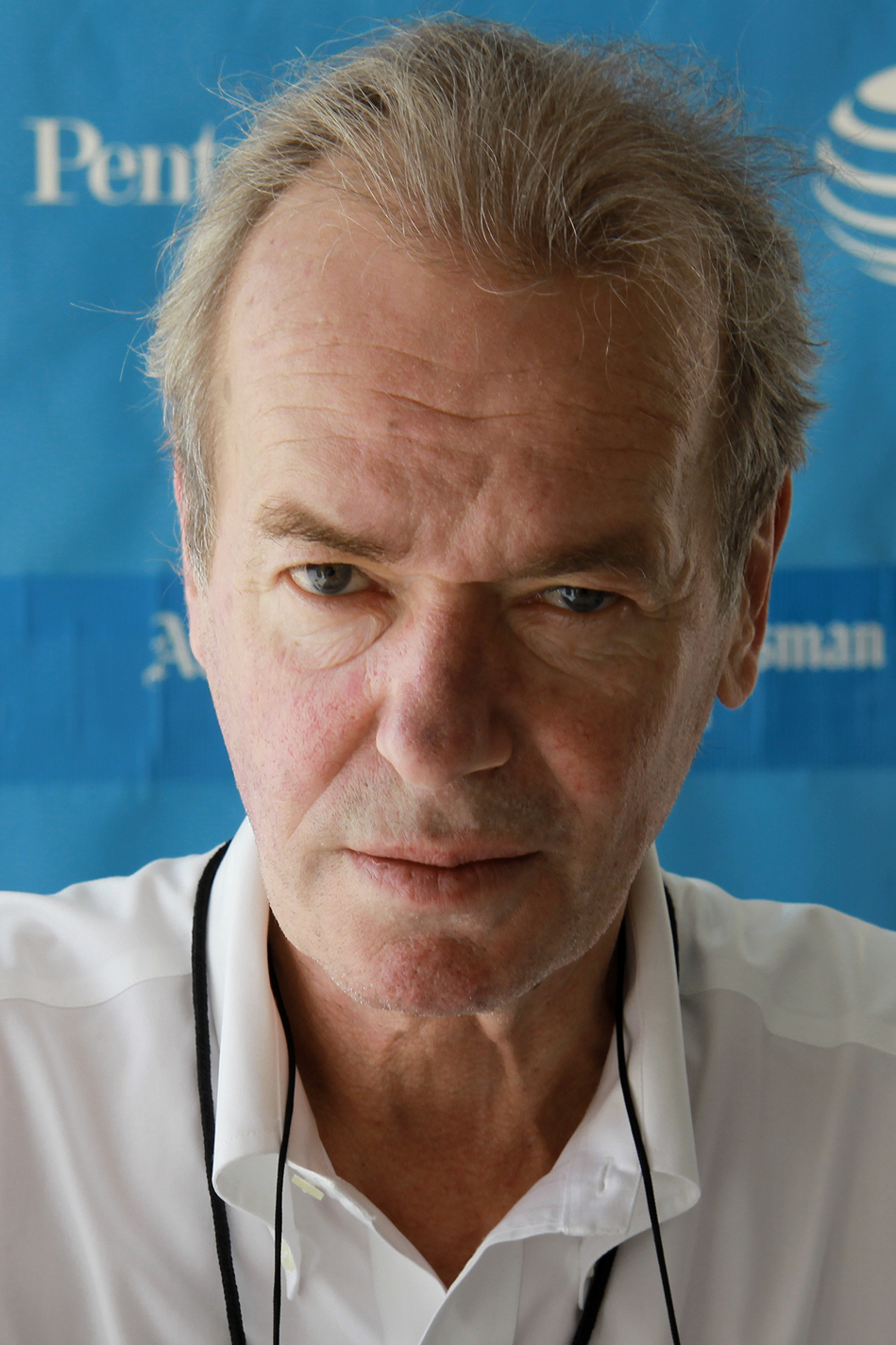
Martin Amis in 2014

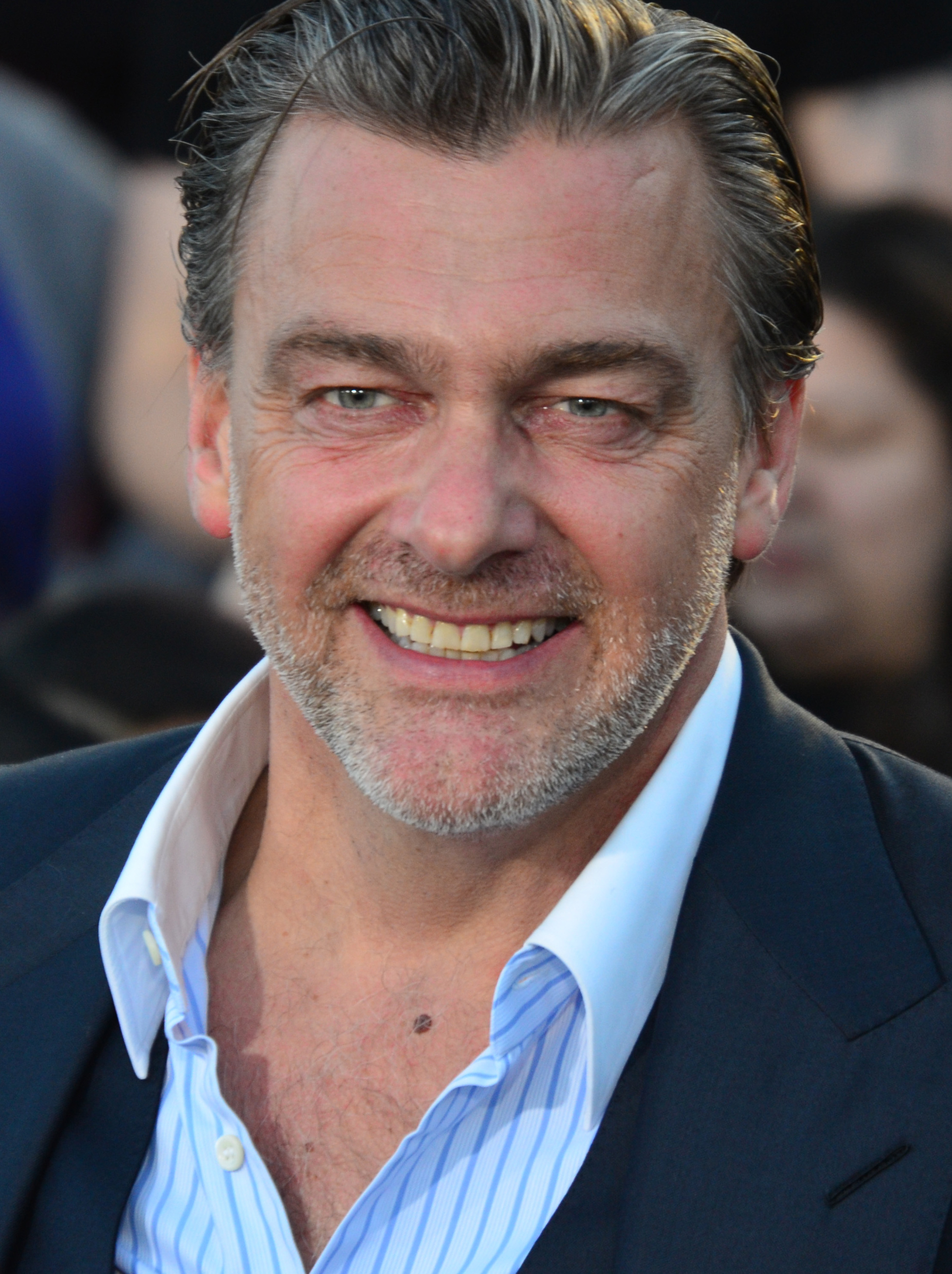
Ray Stevenson in 2014

- 2 May – Alice Coleman, 99, British geographer.
- 3 May – Linda Lewis, 72, English singer-songwriter ("Rock-a-Doodle-Doo").
- 4 May
  - Robert Carswell, Baron Carswell, 88, Northern Irish jurist, Lord Chief Justice (1997–2004).
  - Iain Johnstone, 80, English author, broadcaster and television producer.
- 5 May – Gerald Rose, 87, British illustrator.
- 8 May
  - Terrence Hardiman, 86, English actor (Crown Court, Secret Army, The Demon Headmaster).
  - Neil Matthews, 66, English professional football player (Grimsby Town, Halifax Town, Stockpot County, Lincoln City) and coach.
- 10 May
  - Hugo Burge, 51, British internet entrepreneur and owner of Marchmont House.
  - Rolf Harris, 93, Australian television presenter (Rolf Harris Cartoon Time, Rolf's Cartoon Club, Animal Hospital) and singer ("Jake the Peg", "Two Little Boys").
- 11 May
  - Francis Monkman, 73, English musician (Curved Air, Sky, Matching Mole), songwriter and composer.
  - Andy Provan, 79, Scottish footballer (Barnsley, York City, Chester City, Wrexham, Southport, Torquay United).
- 12 May – David Pollock, 82, British humanist.
- 13 May
  - Peter Brooke, Baron Brooke of Sutton Mandeville, 89, British politician, Secretary of State for Northern Ireland (1989–1992).
  - John Flood, 90, English professional footballer (Southampton, AFC Bournemouth).
- 15 May – Stanley Appel, 89, British television producer and director (Top of the Pops).
- 16 May
  - Uwe Kitzinger, 95, German-born English economist and political adviser.
  - Andy Smart, 63, English comedian (The Comedy Store Players), actor and writer.
- 17 May
  - S. P. Hinduja, 87, Indian-born British businessman (Hinduja Group) and philanthropist.
  - Algy Ward, 63, English heavy metal bassist (Tank, The Damned, The Saints).
- 19 May
  - Martin Amis, 73, British novelist (The Rachel Papers, Money, London Fields, The Information).
  - Andy Rourke, 59, English bassist (The Smiths).
- 21 May
  - Donald Macleod, 82, Scottish theologian.
  - Ray Stevenson, 58, Northern Irish actor (King Arthur, Rome, Punisher: War Zone, RRR).
- 22 May
  - Chas Newby, 81, British bassist (The Beatles).
  - Hugh Strachan, 84, Scottish professional footballer (Motherwell, Greenock Morton, Kilmarnock, Partick Thistle).
- 25 May – Karen Lumley, 59, British Conservative Party politician.
- 26 May – Emily Morgan, 45, British journalist (ITV News).
- 28 May
  - Sir David Brewer, 83, British businessman and politician, Lord Mayor of London (2005–2006) and Lord-Lieutenant of Greater London (2008–2015).
  - George Cassidy, 86, Northern Irish jazz musician and music teacher to Van Morrison.
- 31 May – Patricia Dainton, 93, British actress (Dancing with Crime, The Passionate Stranger, Sixpenny Corner).

== June ==
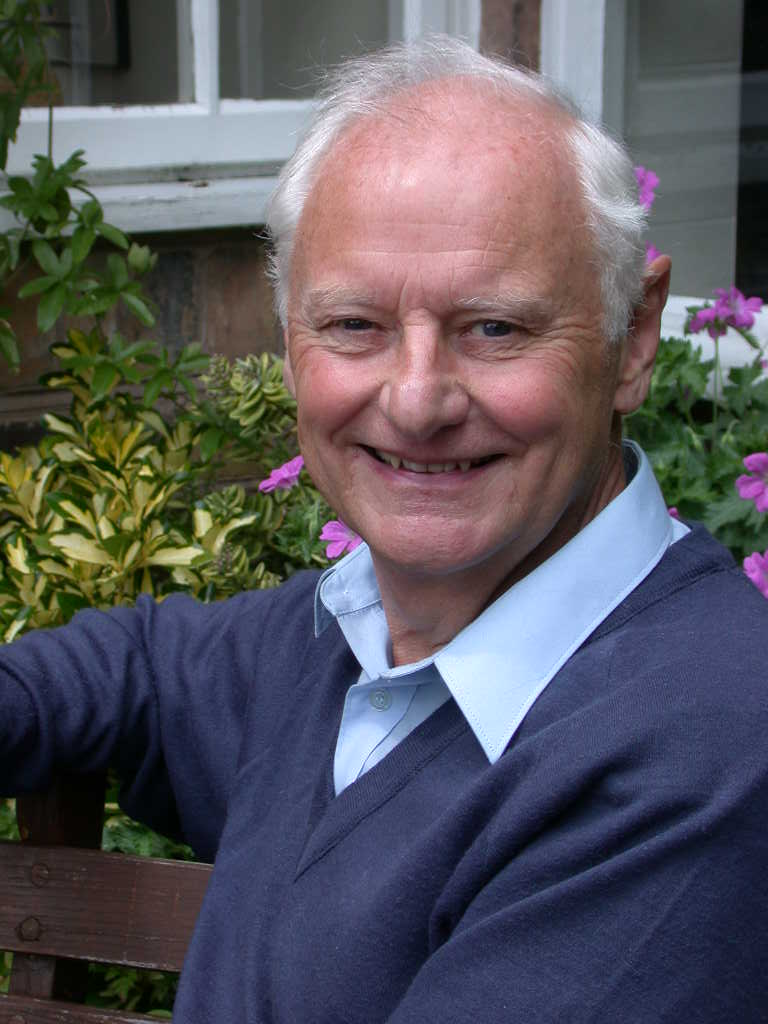
Roger Squires in 2005

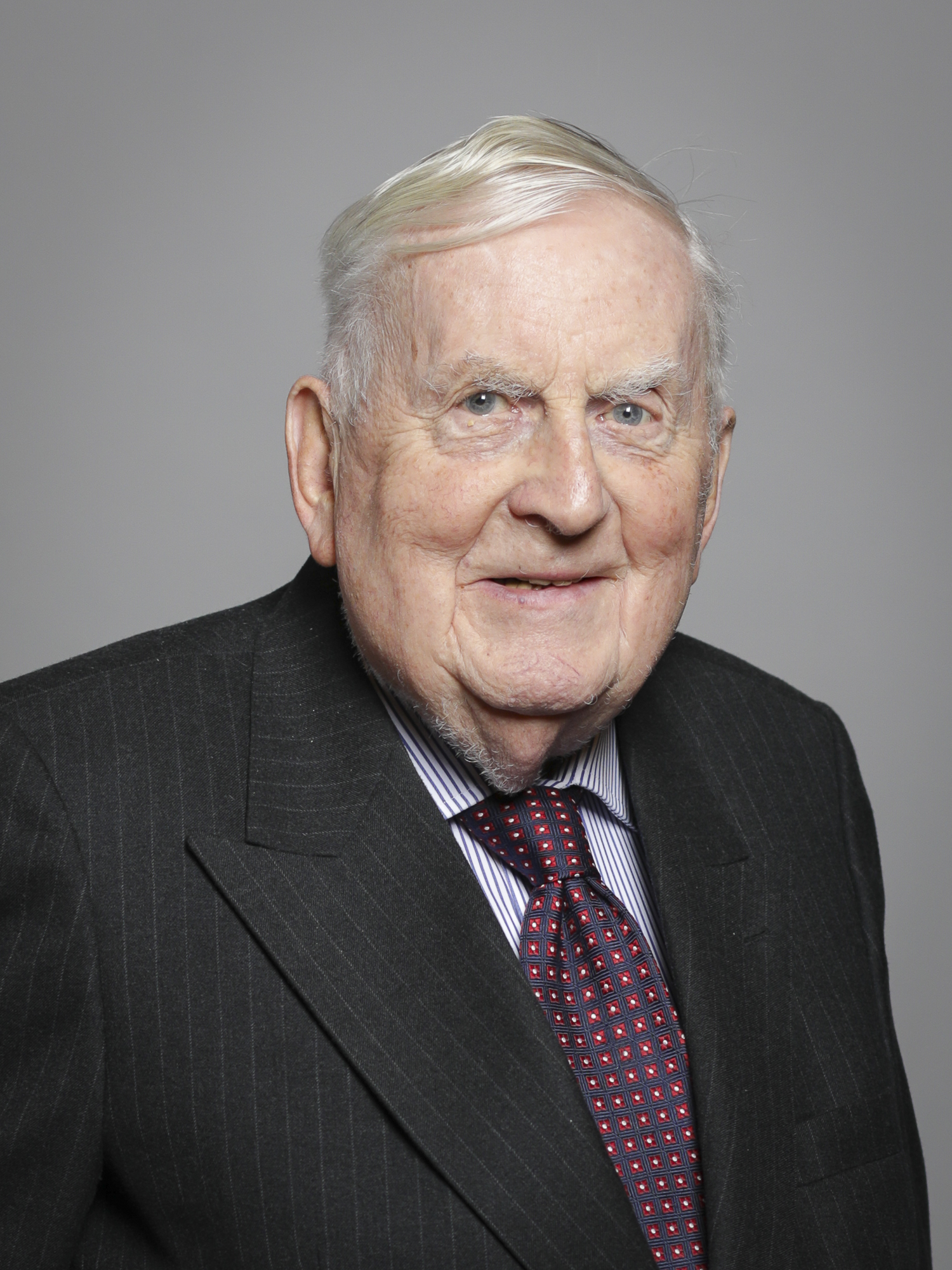
John Morris, Baron Morris of Aberavon in 2019

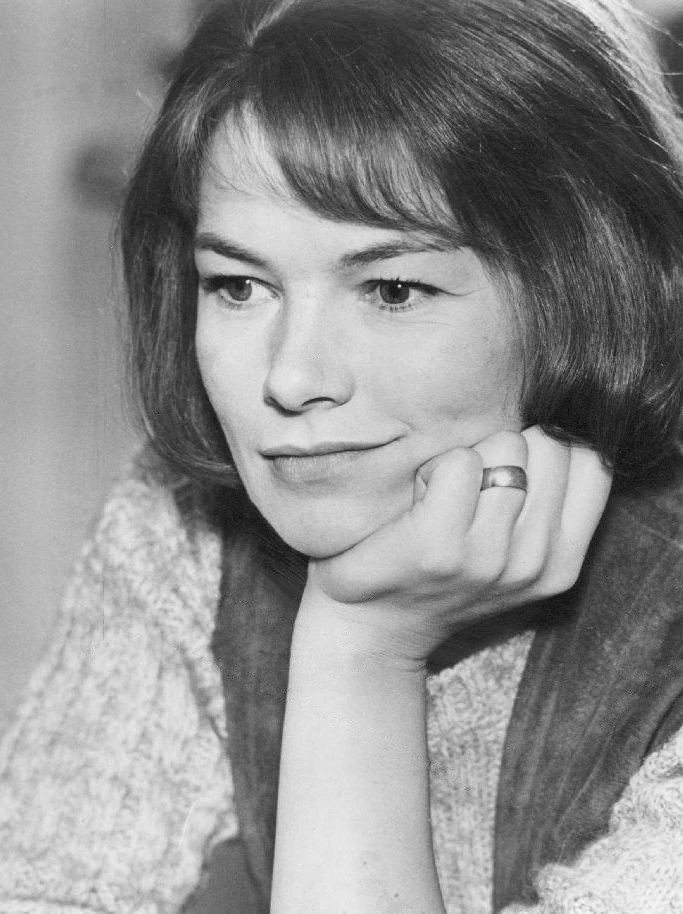
Glenda Jackson in 1971

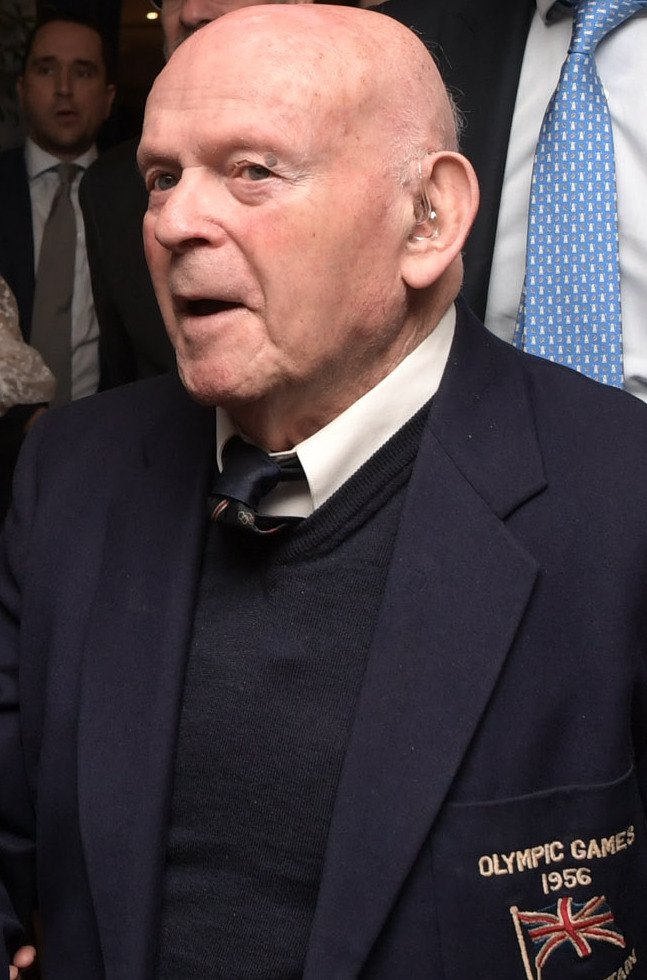
Sir Ben Helfgott in 2021

- 1 June
  - David Jones, 83, British sprinter, Olympic bronze medallist (1960).
  - Roger Squires, 91, British crossword compiler.
- 3 June – Josser Watling, 98, English professional footballer (Bristol Rovers).
- 5 June
  - Elspeth Campbell, Baroness Campbell of Pittenweem, 83, British baroness and wife of Sir Menzies Campbell.
  - John Morris, Baron Morris of Aberavon, 91, Welsh politician, Secretary of State for Wales (1974–1979) and Attorney General (1997–1999).
- 6 June
  - Mike McFarlane, 63, English sprinter, Olympic silver medallist (1988), heart attack.
  - Tony McPhee, 79, English guitarist (The Groundhogs), complications from a fall.
  - Tony Murray, 103, French-born British businessman (Andrews Sykes Group).
- 10 June – Adrian Sprott, 61, Scottish footballer (Meadowbank Thistle, Hamilton Academical, Stenhousemuir).
- 11 June
  - Charles Cadogan, 8th Earl Cadogan, 86, British peer and football administrator, chairman of Chelsea (1981–1982).
  - Stanley Clinton-Davis, Baron Clinton-Davis, 94, British politician, Minister of State for Trade Policy (1997–1998), MP (1970–1983) and member of the House of Lords (1990–2018).
- 12 June – William Lloyd George, 3rd Viscount Tenby, 95, British peer.
- 13 June
  - Nick Kaiser, 68, British cosmologist.
  - Paul Rendall, 69, English rugby union player (Wasps, national team).
- 15 June
  - Glenda Jackson, 87, English actress (Elizabeth R, Women in Love, A Touch of Class) and politician.
  - Gordon McQueen, 70, Scottish footballer (Leeds United, Manchester United, national team) and manager.
- 16 June
  - Peter Dickinson, 88, English composer, musicologist, author, and pianist.
  - Sir Ben Helfgott, 93, Polish-born British Holocaust survivor and Olympic weightlifter (1956, 1960).
  - Angela Thorne, 84, British actress (Lady Oscar, To the Manor Born, Silent Hours).
  - Paxton Whitehead, 85, English actor (Camelot, Back to School, Friends).
- 18 June
  - Shahzada Dawood, 48, Pakistani-British-Maltese businessman, victim of the Titan submersible implosion.
  - Hamish Harding, 58, British billionaire, pilot and explorer, victim of the Titan submersible implosion.
  - Sir Robert Malpas, 95, British engineer and businessman.
- 19 June
  - Billy Bales, 94, English motorcycle speedway rider (Yarmouth Bloaters, Norwich Stars, Sheffield Tigers).
  - Diane Rowe, 90, English table tennis player.
- 20 June – John Waddington, 63, English guitarist (The Pop Group, Maximum Joy, Perfume).
- 21 June – Winnie Ewing, 93, Scottish politician (MP (1967–1970, 1974–1979), MEP (1979–1999), MSP (1999–2003), President of the Scottish National Party (1987–2005)).
- 24 June – Margaret McDonagh, Baroness McDonagh, 61, British politician, member of the House of Lords (since 2004).
- 25 June – Dame Ann Leslie, 82, British journalist (Daily Mail).
- 26 June
  - Craig Brown, 82, Scottish professional footballer and football manager.
  - David Ogilvy, 13th Earl of Airlie, 97, Scottish peer, Lord Chamberlain (1984–1997) and last surviving participant at the coronation of King George VI and Queen Elizabeth.
- 29 June
  - Clarence Barlow, 77, British composer.
  - Peter Horbury, 73, British automotive designer.
- 30 June – Robert Fernley, 70, British motorsport manager and entrepreneur.

== July ==
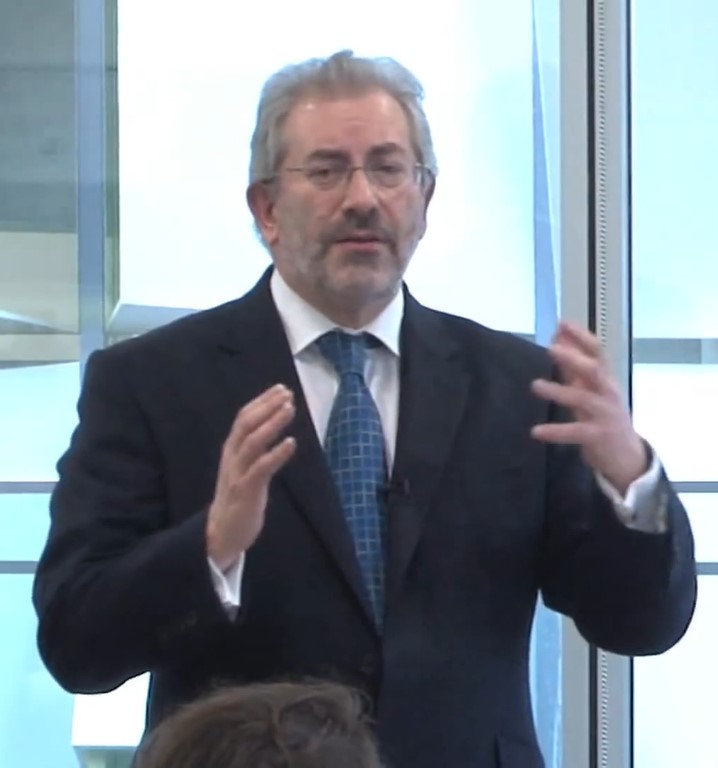
Bob Kerslake, Baron Kerslake in 2012

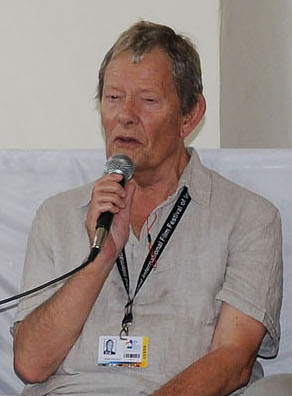
Derek Malcolm in 2012

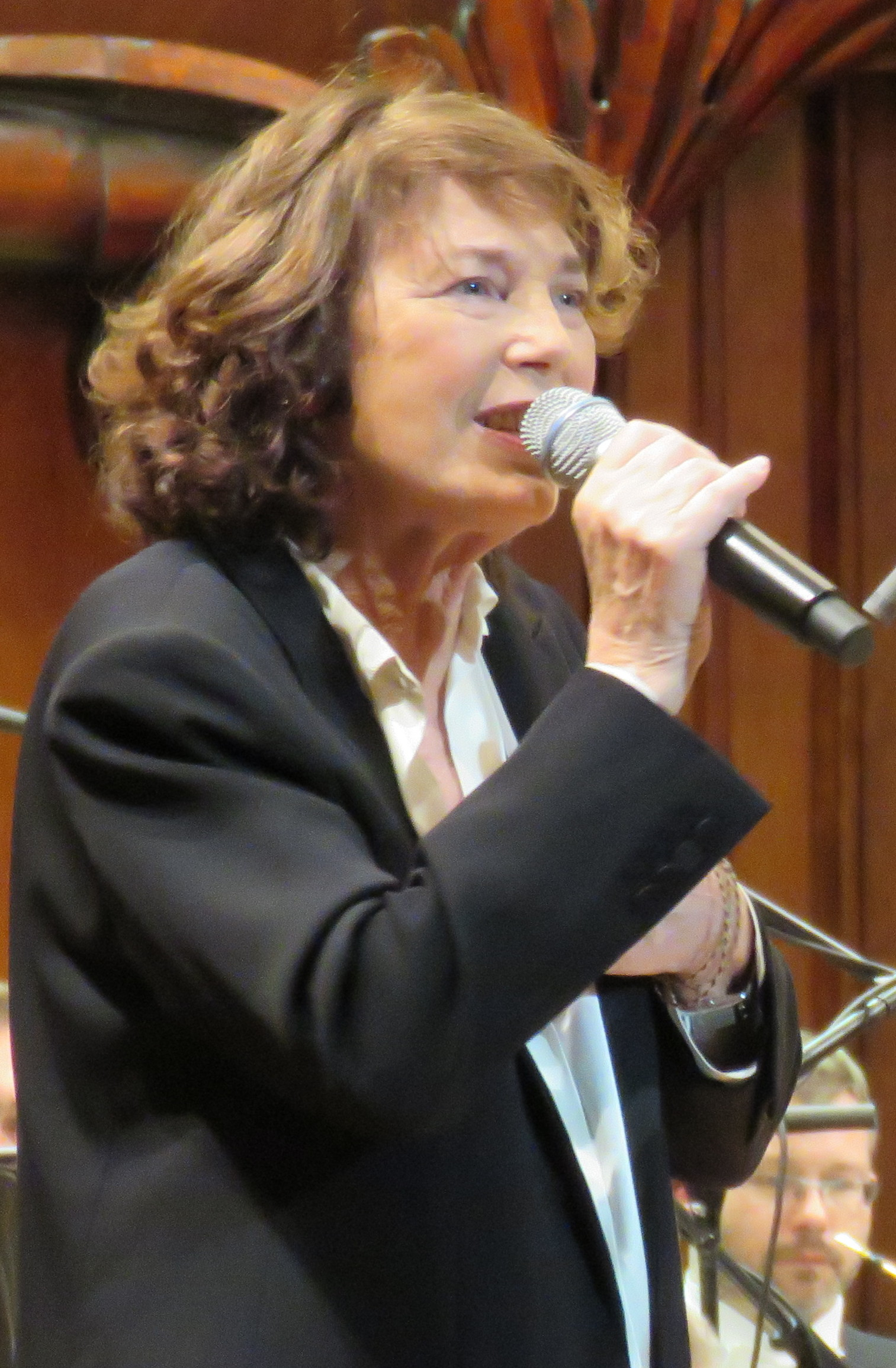
Jane Birkin in 2017

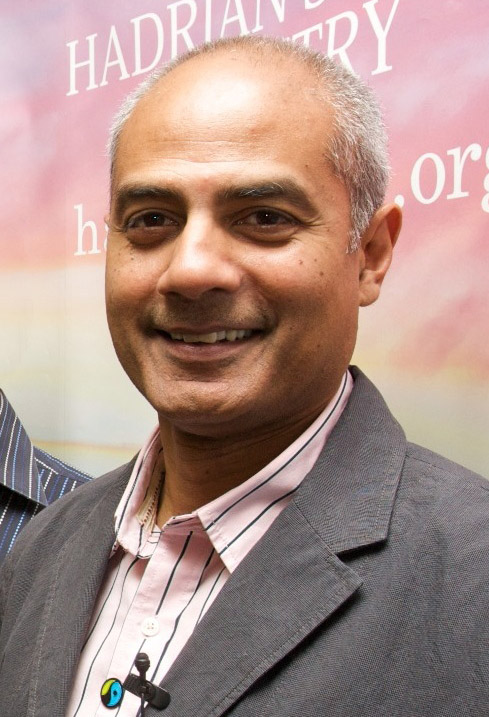
George Alagiah in 2009

- 1 July
  - Meg Johnson, 86, English actress (Coronation Street, Brookside, Emmerdale).
  - Bob Kerslake, Baron Kerslake, 68, British civil servant, head of the Home Civil Service (2012–2014) and member of the House of Lords (since 2015).
- 2 July – Wayne Evans, 51, Welsh professional footballer (Walsall, Rochdale).
- 3 July
  - Mo Foster, 78, English multi-instrumentalist (Affinity, Fancy, RMS) and record producer.
  - Greig Oliver, 58, Scottish rugby union player.
- 5 July
  - Keith Ball, 82, English footballer (Walsall, Port Vale).
  - Anthony Gilbert, 88, British composer and academic.
- 6 July
  - Graham Clark, 81, English opera singer.
  - Colin Spencer, 89, English journalist (The Guardian) and artist.
- 7 July
  - Simon Brown, Baron Brown of Eaton-under-Heywood, 86, British judge and life peer, Justice of the Supreme Court (2009–2012) and member of the House of Lords (2004–2023).
  - Yvonne Littlewood, 95, British television producer and director (Eurovision Song Contest 1963).
- 9 July – Alfred Thomas Grove, 99, British geographer and climatologist.
- 10 July
  - Derek Beales, 92, British historian.
  - Adrian Palmer, 4th Baron Palmer, 71, British peer.
- 11 July – George Armstrong, 60, British actor (Grange Hill, Tucker's Luck).
- 12 July – John Nettleton, 94, English actor (Yes Minister, The New Statesman).
- 13 July
  - Chris Garland, 74, English footballer (Bristol City, Chelsea, Leicester City).
  - John Graham Nicholls, 93, British physiologist.
- 14 July – Tony Butler, 88, British sports broadcaster.
- 15 July – Derek Malcolm, 91, English film critic (The Guardian).
- 16 July
  - George Alston-Roberts-West, 85, British Army officer and courtier.
  - Jane Birkin, 76, British-French actress (Death on the Nile, Evil Under the Sun) and singer ("Je t'aime... moi non plus").
- 17 July – Barry Martyn, 82, English jazz drummer.
- 18 July – Walter Gilbey, British-Manx politician and entrepreneur, member of the House of Keys (1982–2011).
- 19 July
  - Anita Carey, 75, English actress (Coronation Street, Doctors), breast cancer.
  - Mike Hammond, 33, British ice hockey player (Nottingham Panthers), traffic collision.
  - Mark Thomas, 67, British film composer (Twin Town, The Final Curtain, Agent Cody Banks 2: Destination London).
- 21 July
  - Ann Clwyd, 86, Welsh politician, MP (1984–2019) and MEP (1979–1984).
  - Vince Hill, 89, English traditional pop singer ("Edelweiss", "Roses of Picardy", "Merci, Chérie").
- 23 July – Raymond Froggatt, 81, English songwriter ("Callow-la-vita", "Big Ship", "Rachel") and singer.
- 24 July
  - George Alagiah, 67, journalist and presenter (BBC News), bowel cancer.
  - Trevor Francis, 69, footballer, heart attack.
- 27 July – Bobby Arthur, 78, British boxer, national welterweight champion (1972).
- 28 July – Jim Parker, 88, British composer.
- 29 July – Malcolm Deas, 82, English historian.
- 30 July – David W. Potter, 74, Scottish sportswriter.

== August ==
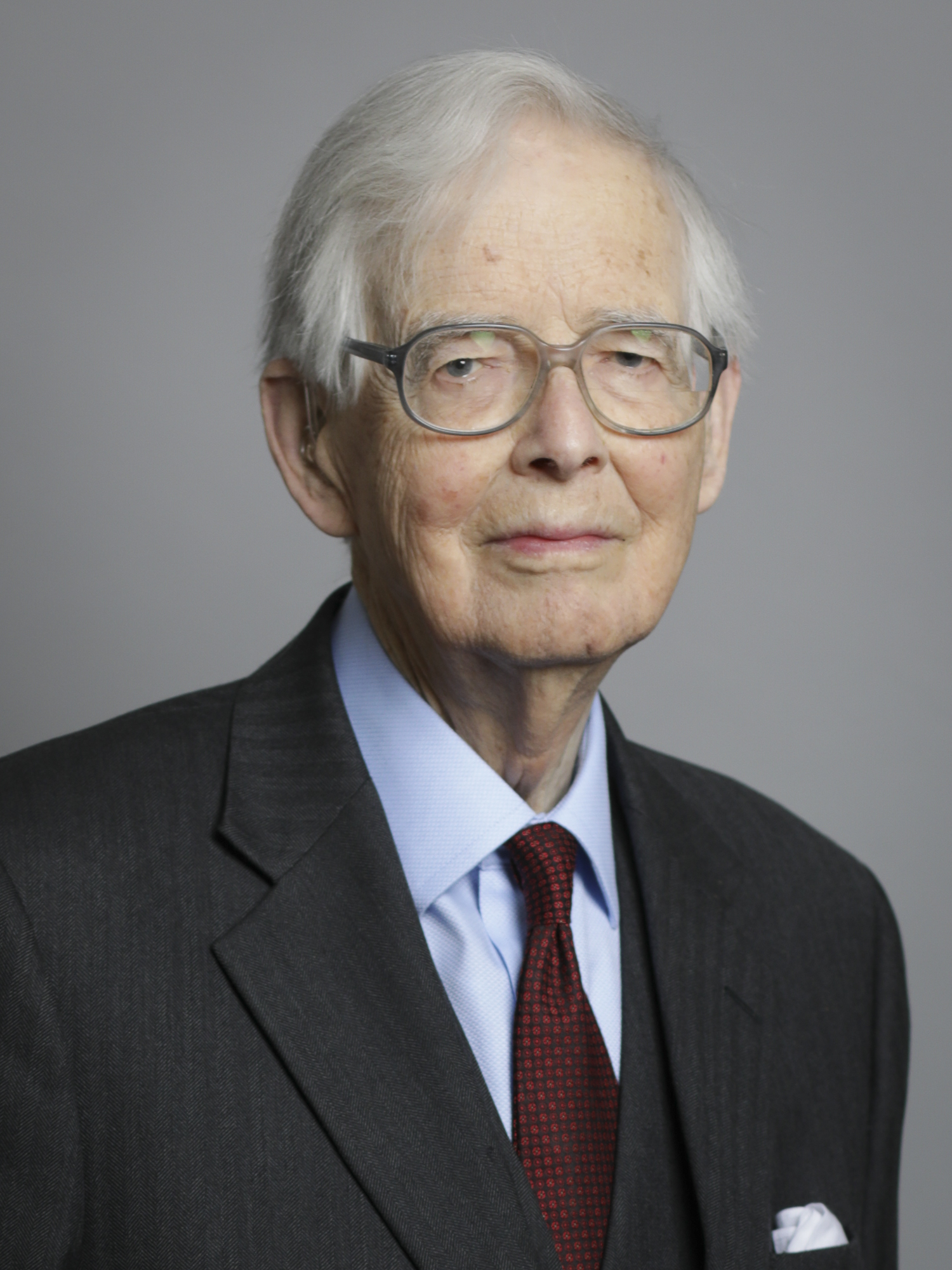
Rodney Elton, 2nd Baron Elton in 2020

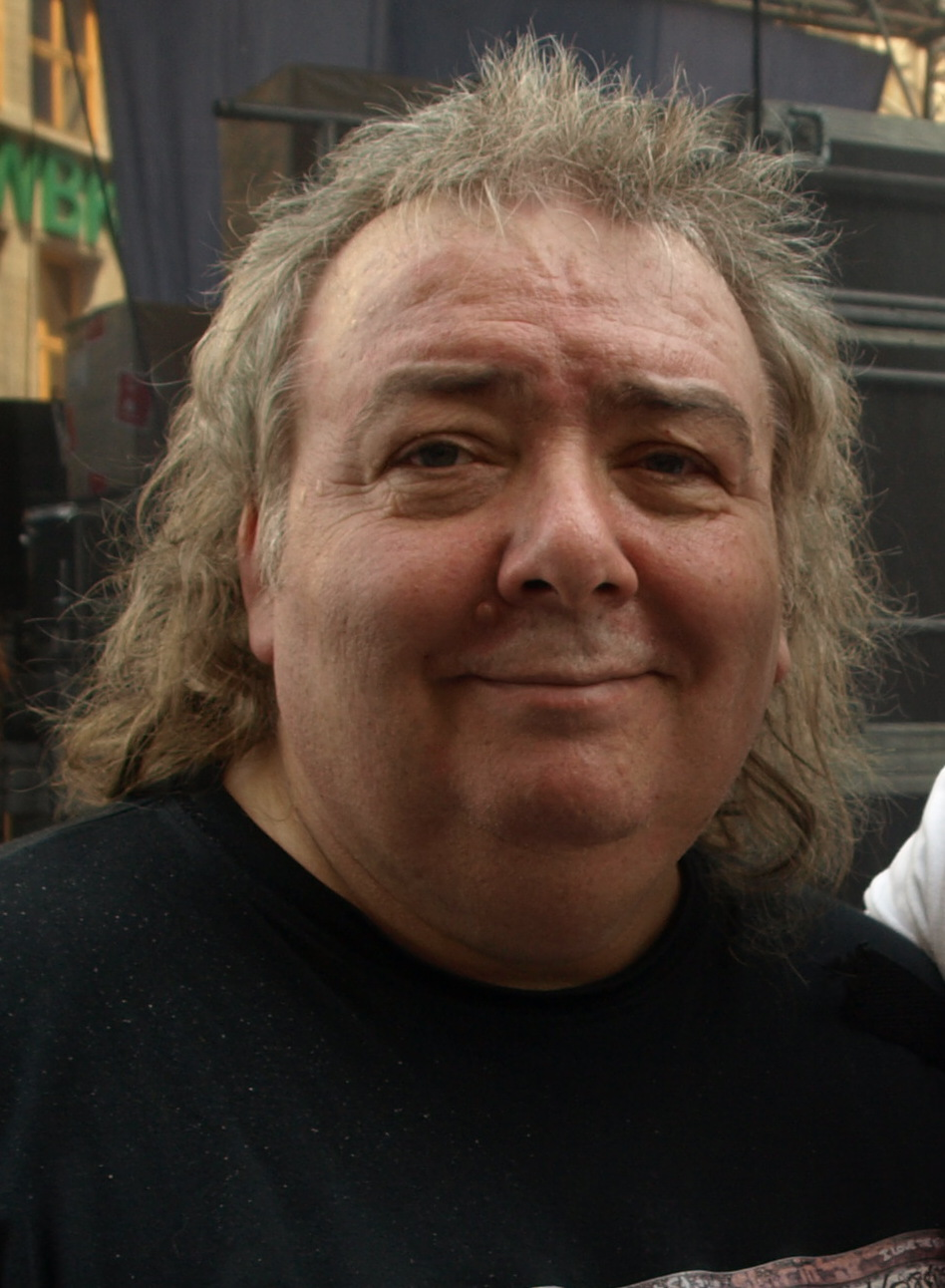
Bernie Marsden in 2012

- 1 August – Tony Brien, 54, Irish footballer (Leicester City, Chesterfield, Rotherham United, West Bromwich Albion, Hull City).
- 2 August – Tom Kempinski, 85, British actor (Dixon of Dock Green, Z-Cars) and playwright.
- 3 August – Carl Davis, 86, American-born British conductor and composer (Pride and Prejudice).
- 4 August – Michael Boyd, 68, British theatre director (Royal Shakespeare Company).
- 8 August – Jamie Reid, 76, English visual artist (Sex Pistols) and anarchist.
- 9 August
  - John Coddington, 85, English professional footballer (Huddersfield Town, Blackburn Rovers, Stockport County).
  - Doreen Mantle, 97, South African-born actress (One Foot in the Grave, Jam & Jerusalem, Yentl).
- 10 August – Alec Jackson, 86, English footballer (West Bromwich Albion, Birmingham City, Walsall).
- 13 August
  - Patricia Bredin, 88, UK's first Eurovision Song Contest participant in 1957.
  - Joe Caven, 86, Scottish footballer (Brighton & Hove Albion).
- 14 August
  - Harris Mann, 85, British car designer (Morris Marina, Austin Allegro, Princess, Triumph TR7).
  - Brian Snowdon, 88, English professional footballer (Blackpool, Portsmouth, Millwall, Crystal Palace).
- 16 August
  - John Elsom, 84, English football chairman (Leicester City).
  - Michael Parkinson, 88, English television and radio presenter (Parkinson, Give Us a Clue, Desert Island Discs, Going for a Song).
- 19 August – Rodney Elton, 2nd Baron Elton, 88, British peer and politician.
- 21 August – Andy Rankin, 79, English professional footballer (Everton, Watford, Huddersfield Town).
- 22 August – Bobby Noble, 77, English footballer (Manchester United).
- 24 August – Bernie Marsden, 72, English hard rock guitarist (UFO, Whitesnake).
- 27 August – Michael Brougham, 5th Baron Brougham and Vaux, 85, British peer and politician, member of the House of Lords (since 1968).
- 28 August – Alan Haworth, Baron Haworth, 75, British life peer and politician, heart attack.
- 29 August – Jamie Crick, 57, British radio broadcaster (Classic FM, Jazz FM, Scala Radio).
- 30 August – Mohamed Al-Fayed, 94, British-based Egyptian businessman, former owner of Harrods.

== September ==
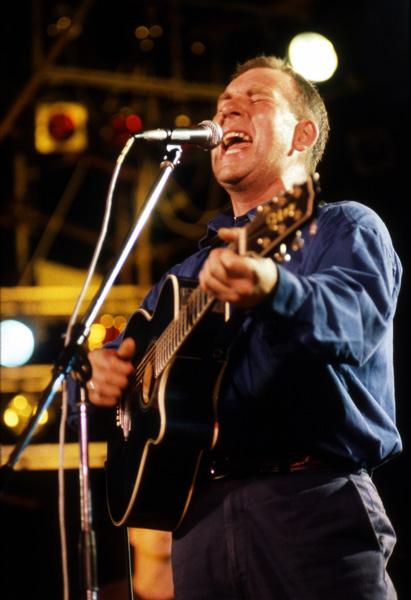
Brendan Croker in 1989

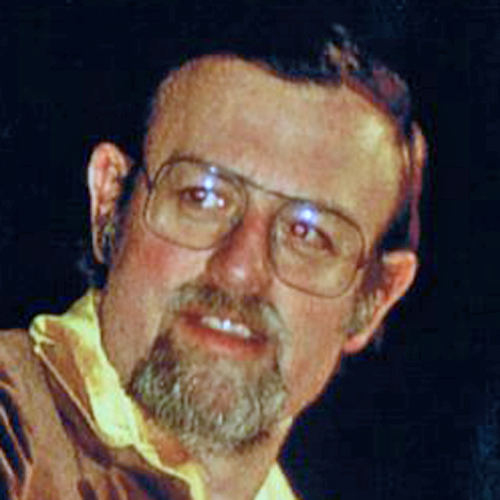
Roger Whittaker in 1976

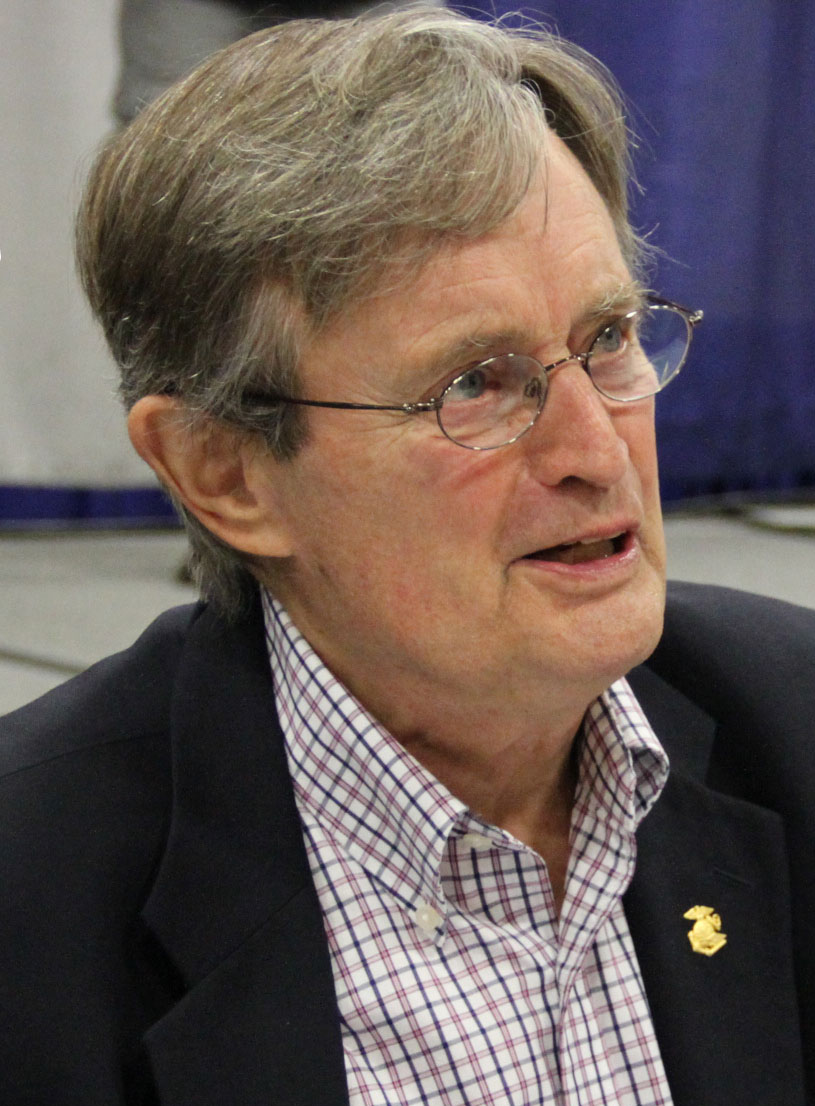
David McCallum in 2015

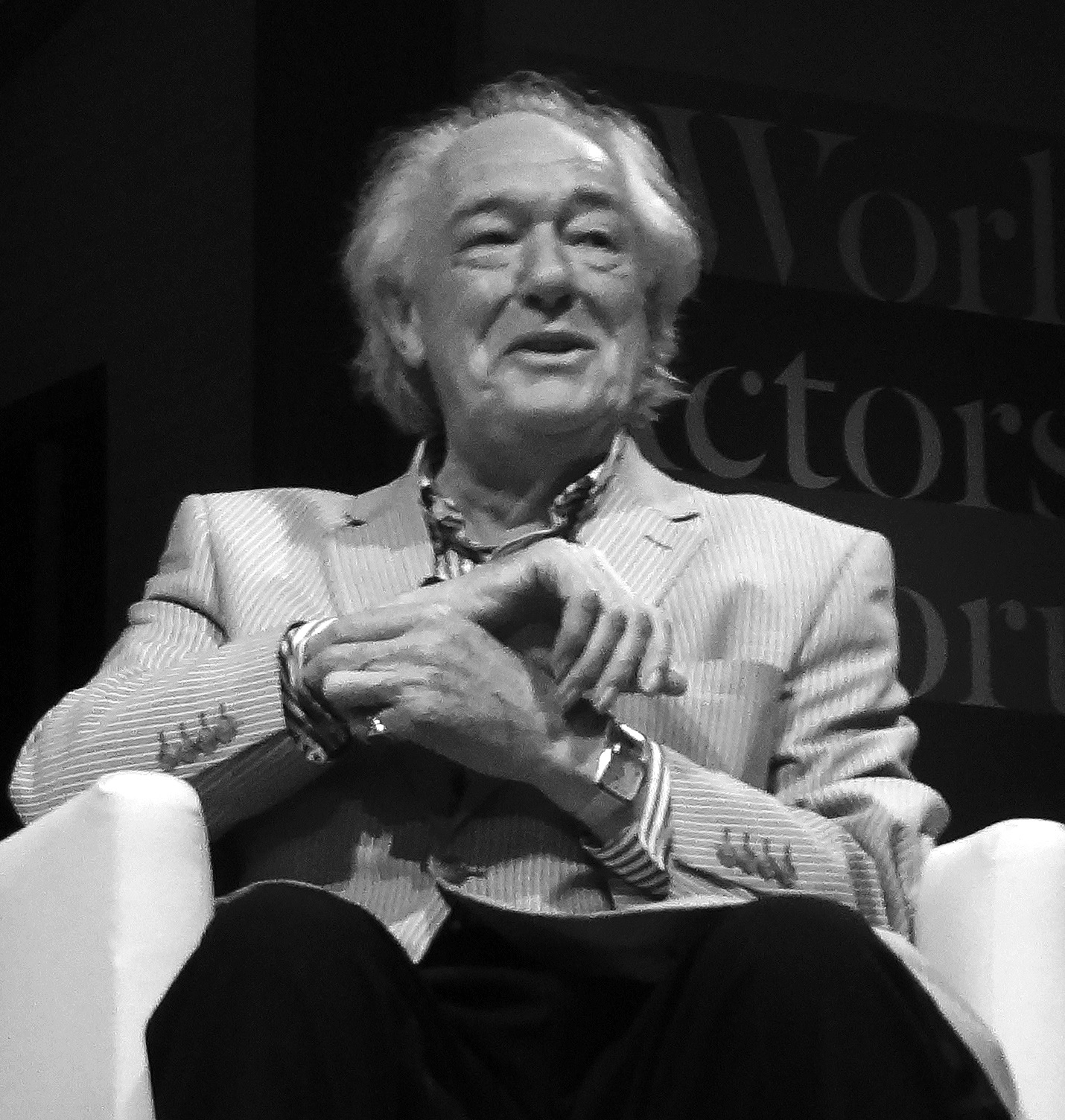
Sir Michael Gambon in 2013

- 2 September – Mark Pearson, 83, English footballer (Manchester United, Sheffield Wednesday, Fulham, Halifax Town).
- 3 September – John F. C. Turner, 96, British architect and theorist.
- 5 September
  - Joe Fagin, 83, English singer-songwriter.
  - Bruce Guthro, 62, Canadian-born vocalist (Runrig).
  - John Stevenson, 86, British screenwriter (Brass, Coronation Street).
- 6 September
  - John Cairney, 93, Scottish actor (A Night to Remember, Cleopatra, Jason and the Argonauts), author and painter.
  - Ian Hamilton, 55, English professional footballer (Cambridge United, Scunthorpe United, West Bromwich Albion, Sheffield United, Notts County, Lincoln City).
- 8 September
  - Karowei Dorgu, 65, Nigerian-born British doctor and Anglican prelate, suffragan Bishop of Woolwich (since 2017).
  - Mike Yarwood, 82, English comedian and impersonator.
- 9 September – John Harris, 84, English professional footballer (Wolverhampton Wanderers, Walsall).
- 10 September
  - Brendan Croker, 70, English musician (The Notting Hillbillies).
  - Nico Ladenis, 89, British cook and restaurateur.
  - Sir Ian Wilmut, 79, British embryologist, creator of Dolly the sheep.
- 12 September
  - Jean Boht, 91, English actress (Bread).
  - Elizabeth Jeffreys, 82, British Byzantinologist.
- 13 September
  - Sir William Gage, 85, British judge, Lord Justice of Appeal (2004–2008).
  - Jose Harris, 82, British historian and academic.
  - Roger Whittaker, 87, British singer-songwriter ("Durham Town (The Leavin')", "I Don't Believe in If Anymore", "The Last Farewell").
- 16 September
  - Colin Murphy, 79, English football player (Derby County, Lincoln City, Stockport County, Southend United) and manager (Notts County).
  - Horace Ové, 86, Trinidad and Tobago-born filmmaker (Pressure).
- 17 September
  - Arthur Longbottom, 90, English footballer (Queens Park Rangers, Port Vale, Millwall, Oxford United, Colchester United).
  - Ronnie McKinnon, 83, Scottish professional footballer (Rangers, Scotland).
- 21 September – Robin Gladwin, 83, English footballer (Norwich City, Oxford United).
- 23 September – Cheryl Murray, 71, English Actress (Coronation Street, Hi-de-Hi!, Sorry!).
- 25 September – David McCallum, 90, Scottish actor (The Man from U.N.C.L.E., NCIS, The Great Escape) and musician.
- 28 September – Sir Michael Gambon, 82, Irish-born English actor (Harry Potter, Gosford Park, The King's Speech), pneumonia.

== October ==
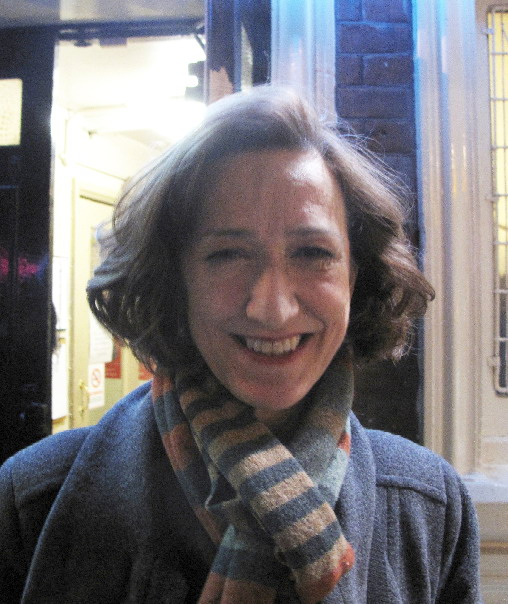
Haydn Gwynne in 2015

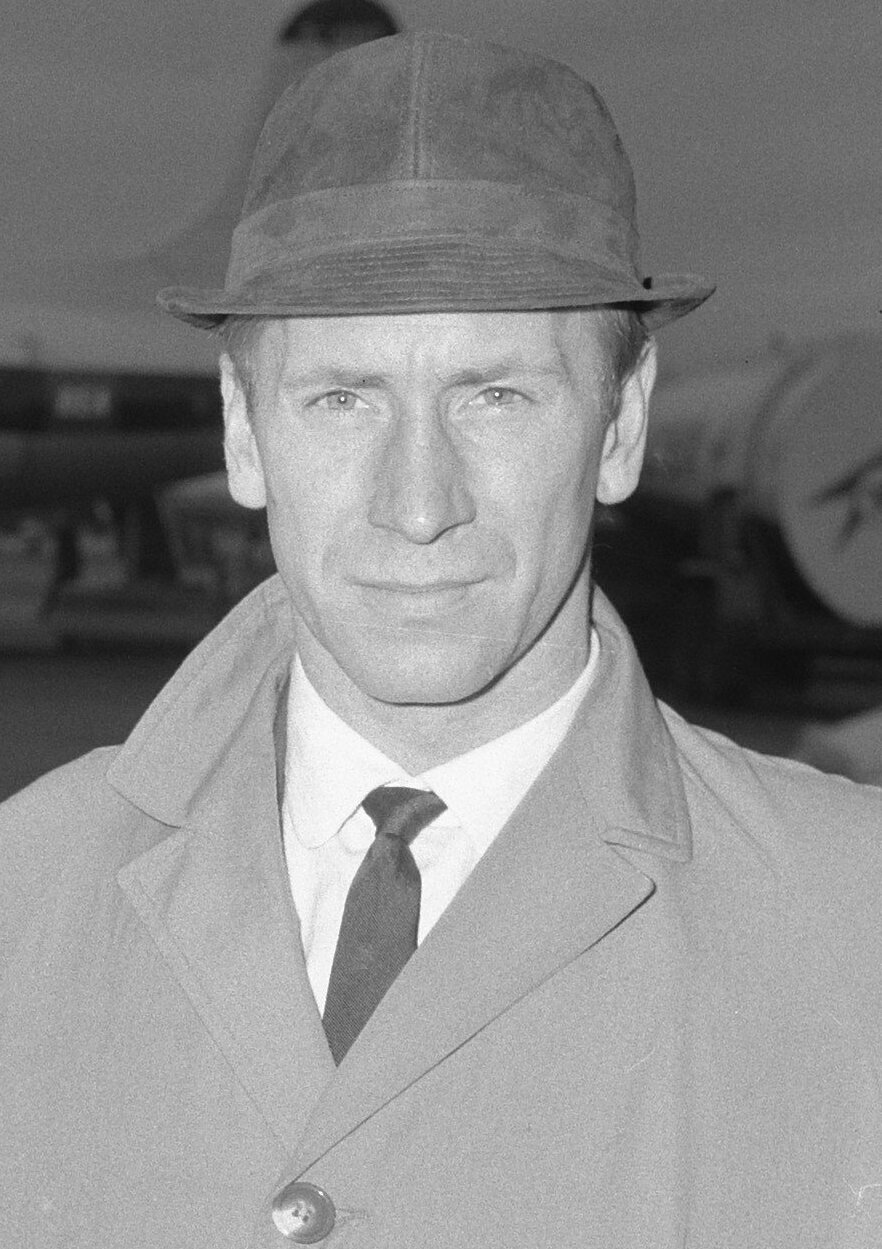
Sir Bobby Charlton in 1964

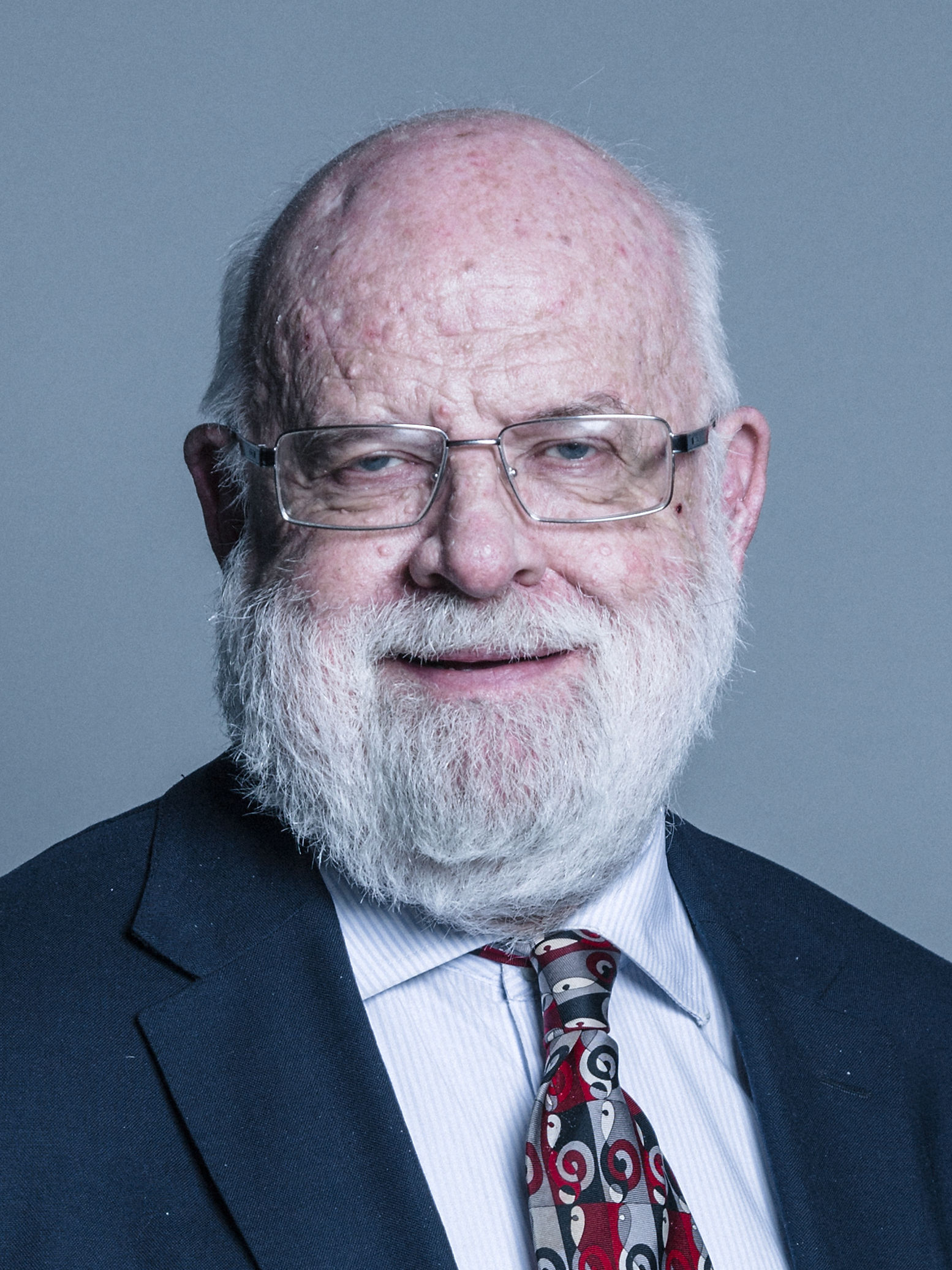
Murray Elder, Baron Elder in 2018

- 1 October
  - Wilf Billington, 93, English footballer (Workington, Blackburn Rovers).
  - Eve Bunting, 94, Northern Irish-born American author (Smoky Night, The Presence: A Ghost Story), pneumonia.
  - Sir Christopher Lewinton, 91, British-American businessman.
  - Frank McDougall, 65, Scottish professional footballer (Clydebank, St Mirren, Aberdeen).
  - Peter Penfold, 79, British diplomat, governor of the Virgin Islands (1991–1996) and high commissioner to Sierra Leone (1997–2000), cancer.
  - John Waring, 81, English cricketer (Yorkshire, Warwickshire).
- 2 October
  - Francis Lee, 79, English footballer (Manchester City, Bolton Wanderers, national team) and chairman, cancer.
  - Gary Simpson, 64, English footballer (Chesterfield, Chester City).
- 3 October – Arthur Burns, 87, British historian.
- 4 October
  - David Benedictus, 85, English novelist (The Fourth of June, This Animal Is Mischievous, Return to the Hundred Acre Wood).
  - Tommy Hoyland, 91, English professional footballer (Sheffield United, Bradford City).
  - Robin Rumboll, 84, radio executive and Jersey politician who founded Channel 103.
- 5 October
  - Peter Mack, 68, British scholar, traffic collision.
  - Edmund Marshall, 83, British politician, MP (1971–1983).
  - Bill Munro, 89, Scottish football player (Barrow) and manager (Clydebank, Airdrieonians).
  - Sir Nicholas Stadlen, 73, British judge, mesothelioma.
- 6 October
  - Nicholas Crafts, 74, British economist, sepsis.
  - Roger Greenhalgh, 82, British academic and writer.
  - Susan Thomas, Baroness Thomas of Walliswood, 87, British businesswoman and politician, member of the House of Lords (1994–2016).
- 7 October
  - Terence Davies, 77, English film director and screenwriter (Distant Voices, Still Lives, The Long Day Closes, The Deep Blue Sea).
  - Anthony Holden, 76, English journalist and author.
- 8 October – Sir Thomas Legg, 88, British civil servant, Clerk of the Crown in Chancery (1989–1998).
- 9 October
  - Anthony Hickox, 64, English film director (Waxwork, Hellraiser III: Hell on Earth, Prince Valiant).
  - Jan Needle, 80, English author.
- 12 October – Neil Le Bihan, 47, English footballer (Peterborough United).
- 13 October
  - Linda Arkley, 71, British politician, mayor of North Tyneside (2003–2005, 2009–2013).
  - Benedict Birnberg, 93, British solicitor and human rights activist, pneumonia.
  - Hugh Russell, 63, boxer, Olympic bronze medallist (1980)
  - Sir Antony Walker, 89, British army general, commandant of the Royal College of Defence Studies (1990–1992), heart failure.
- 14 October – Gwyn Richards, 71, Welsh cricketer.
- 15 October
  - Edward Cairney, 82, convicted murderer.
  - Gerry Ryan, 68, Irish professional footballer (Republic of Ireland, Derby County, Brighton & Hove Albion).
- 16 October
  - Paul Bryer, 65, English Anglican clergyman, archdeacon of Cornwall (since 2019).
  - Gordon Low, 83, Scottish footballer (Huddersfield Town, Bristol City, Stockport County).
- 17 October – Trevor Beeson, 97, English Anglican clergyman, dean of Winchester (1987–1996).
- 18 October
  - Tony Husband, 73, British cartoonist (Private Eye, Round the Bend, Hangar 17), heart attack.
  - Paul Reynolds, 50, English cricket umpire (Cricket Ireland).
  - David P. Webster, 95, Scottish author, historian, and sports promoter (World Highland Games Championships), complications from dementia.
- 19 October
  - Alan J. W. Bell, 85, British television producer and director (Last of the Summer Wine, Ripping Yarns, The Hitchhiker's Guide to the Galaxy).
  - David Turner, 77, British computer scientist.
  - Anthony Vidler, 82, English architectural historian.
- 20 October
  - Donald Angus Cameron of Lochiel, 77, Scottish clan chief and public servant, Lord Lieutenant of Inverness (2002–2021).
  - Gerry Cranham, 94, English sports photographer.
  - Haydn Gwynne, 66, English actress (Drop the Dead Donkey, The Windsors, Billy Elliot the Musical), cancer.
  - Donald Mackay, 86, Scottish-born Canadian chemical engineer.
  - John Thorn, 98, English schoolmaster, writer and educational consultant.
- 21 October
  - Sir Bobby Charlton CBE, 86, English footballer (Manchester United, national team) and manager (Preston North End), world champion (1966).
  - Carroll Coates, 94, British-American songwriter, composer and lyricist.
  - Bill Gates, 79, English footballer (Middlesbrough).
- 22 October – Dave Courtney, 64, English self-proclaimed gangster.
- 23 October
  - Angelo Bruschini, 62, English guitarist (The Blue Aeroplanes, Massive Attack), lung cancer.
  - Desert Crown, 4, British racehorse, Epsom Derby winner (2022), euthanised.
  - Bill Kenwright, 78, English theater producer (Blood Brothers) and football administrator, chairman of Everton (since 2004), liver cancer.
- 24 October
  - Murray Elder, Baron Elder, 73, Scottish politician and member of the House of Lords (1999–2003).
  - Bob Pomphrey, 79, English cricketer (Hertfordshire).
  - Robin Turner, 81, British Anglican priest, Chaplain-in-Chief of the Royal Air Force (1995–1998).
- 26 October – John Wilkie, 76, Scottish footballer (Halifax Town, Wigan Athletic).
- 28 October
  - Domenico Genovese, 62, English professional football player (Peterborough United) and manager.
  - Saleemul Huq, 71, British-Bangladeshi climatologist, director of ICCCAD (since 2009), heart attack.
- 29 October
  - Charlie Aitken, 81, Scottish footballer (Aston Villa).
  - Dick Fontaine, 83–84, English documentary filmmaker.
  - Trevor Hill, 98, British producer (Children's Hour, Round Britain Quiz, Sooty), director and writer.
- 31 October
  - Donald Longmore, 95, British heart surgeon.
  - Ronnie Rees, 79, Welsh footballer (Coventry City).
  - Hugh Wyllie, 89, Scottish Presbyterian minister, moderator of the General Assembly of the Church of Scotland (1992–1993).

== November ==
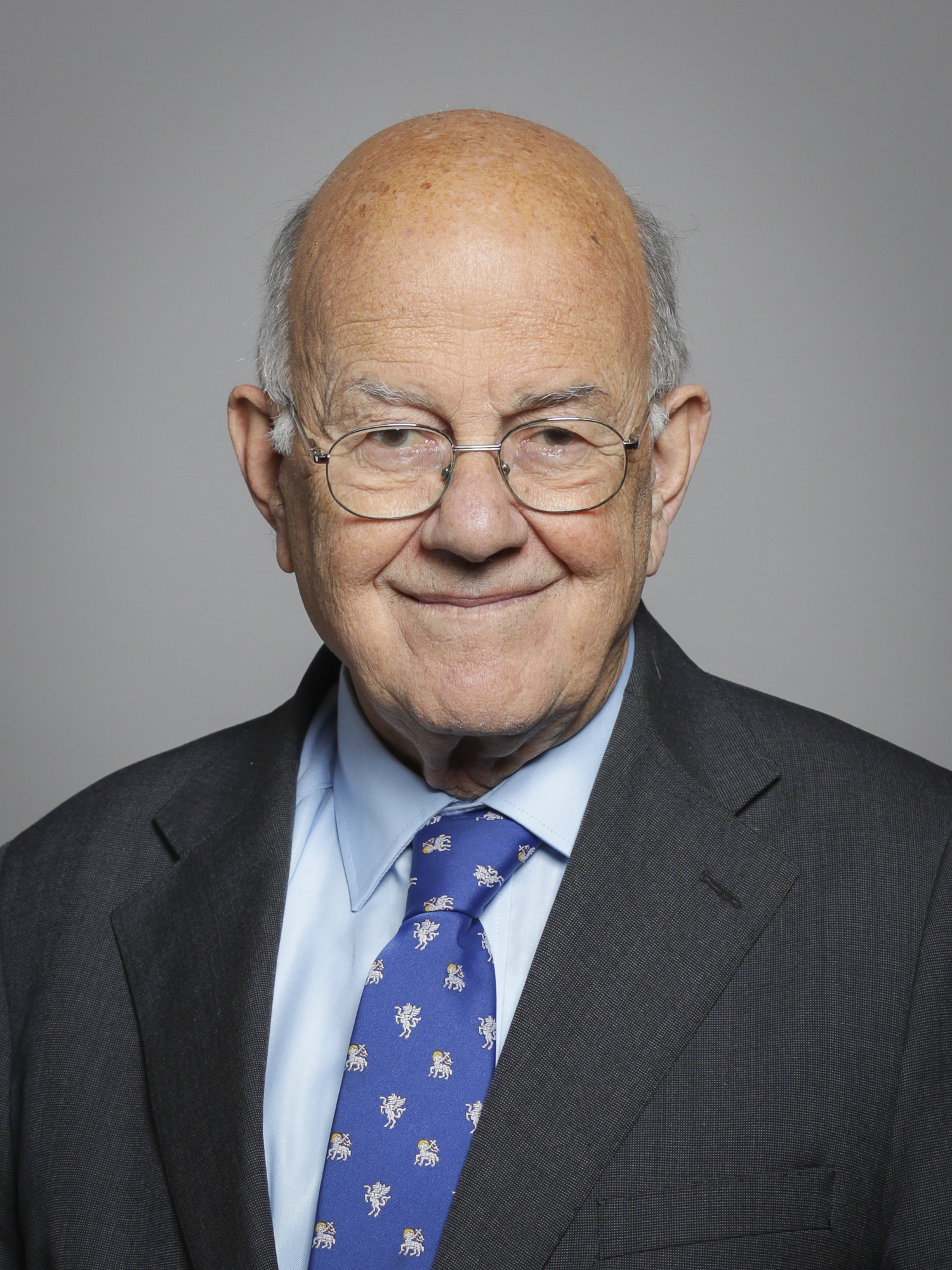
Igor Judge, Baron Judge in 2019

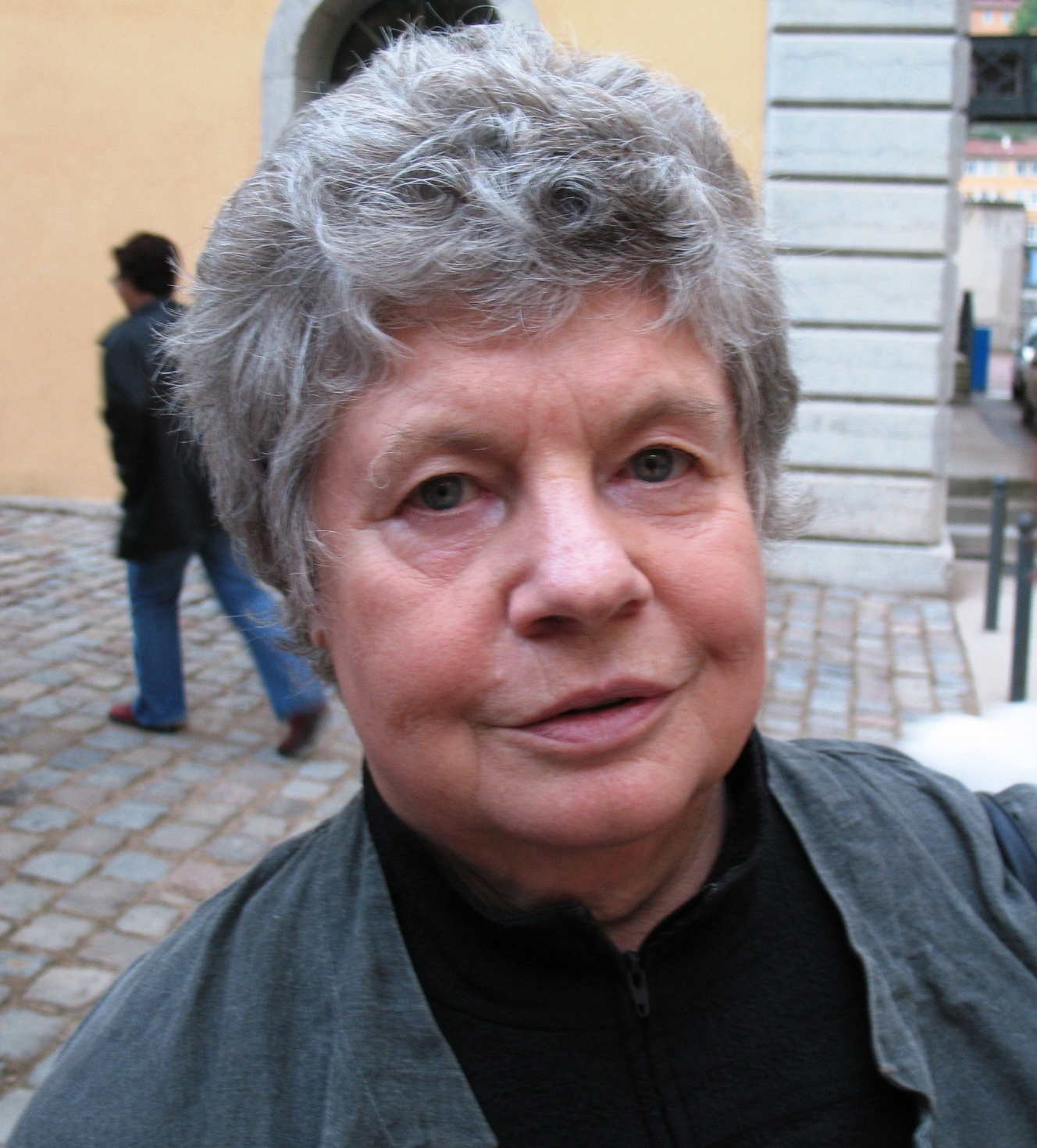
Dame A. S. Byatt in 2007

- 1 November – Brian Hebditch, 75, British Olympic sports shooter (1976), traffic collision.
- 2 November
  - Jack Bamford, 86, English George Cross recipient.
  - John Havers, 92, English badminton player (national team).
  - Bobby Welch, 94, British criminal (Great Train Robbery), complications from Alzheimer's disease. (death announced on this date)
- 3 November
  - Patrick Brownsey, 75, British-born New Zealand botanist and philatelist.
  - Pete Garner, 61, British bassist (The Stone Roses), cancer. (death announced on this date)
- 4 November
  - Robert Knecht, 97, British historian.
  - John Whitney, 92, British writer and producer.
- 5 November
  - Michael J. Alexander, 82, British translator (Beowulf), poet and broadcaster.
  - Ryland Davies, 88, operatic tenor.
  - Anne Hart, 90, British actress and singer.
  - David Hilditch, 60, DUP politician and Member of the Northern Ireland Assembly (1998–2003)
- 6 November
  - John Fahy, 80, Scottish footballer (Germiston Callies, Oxford United).
  - Sean Martin, 26, English musician (The Night Café). (death announced on this date)
  - Norman Munnoch, 94, Scottish rugby union player (Watsonian, Edinburgh District, national team).
- 7 November
  - Stuart Jardine, 90, British Olympic sailor (1968, 1972).
  - Igor Judge, Baron Judge, 82, English judge, lord chief justice (2008–2013).
- 8 November
  - Dale Reid, 64, Scottish golfer.
  - Tony Thirlwall, 82, British economist.
  - Adrian Webster, 72, English football player (Seattle Sounders, Colchester United) and manager (Phoenix Inferno).
  - Bob White, 87, English cricketer (Middlesex, Nottinghamshire).
- 9 November
  - John Nuttall, 56, British long-distance runner who competed in track and cross country running.
  - James Robertson, 95, British political activist, economist, and writer.
  - Joe Tilson, 95, British visual artist.
  - Tim Woodward, 70, English actor (Wings, Piece of Cake, Agatha Christie's Poirot, Murder City).
- 10 November – Colin MacKay, 79, Scottish journalist.
- 11 November – Helen Place, radio presenter, newsreader and journalist (BBC Radio 5 Live, BBC Radio York)
- 12 November
  - Joan Jara, 96, British-Chilean dancer and human rights activist.
  - Anna Scher, 78, British-Irish drama school founder.
- 13 November – Gordon Wallace, 74, Scottish footballer (Raith Rovers, Dundee United, Berwick Rangers).
- 14 November
  - Sir Tom Arnold, 76, British politician, MP (1974–1997).
  - Brian Cotter, Baron Cotter, 87, British politician, MP (1997–2005) and member of the House of Lords (since 2006).
- 15 November – David Rowe-Beddoe, 85, businessman and first chair of the Wales Millennium Centre.
- 16 November
  - Dame A. S. Byatt, 87, English novelist (The Virgin in the Garden, Possession, Still Life) and critic.
  - Peter Solley, 75, English musician (Fox) and record producer.
  - Robert Walker, Baron Walker of Gestingthorpe, 85, British jurist, justice of the supreme court (2009–2013), Lord of Appeal in Ordinary (2002–2009) and Lord Justice of Appeal (1997–2002).
- 17 November – John C. G. Röhl, 85, British historian.
- 18 November – Paul Watson, 81, British documentary filmmaker, complications from dementia.

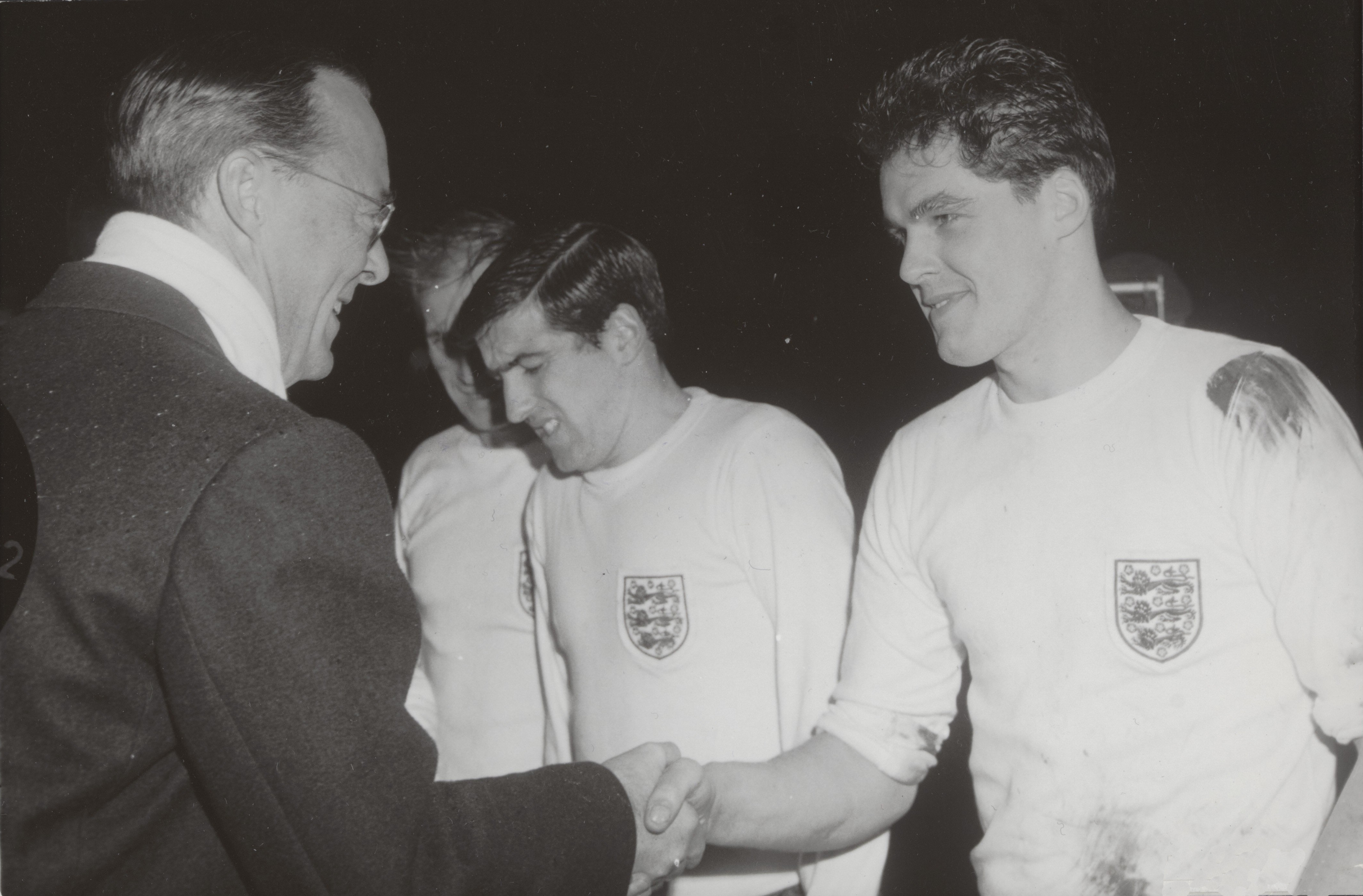
Terry Venables (middle) with England in 1964 when he played against the Netherlands

- 19 November
  - Joss Ackland, 95, British actor (White Mischief, Lethal Weapon 2, The Mighty Ducks).
  - Eddie Linden, 88, Scottish publisher and poet.
- 20 November – Annabel Giles, 64, British actress (Firelight) and psychotherapist.
- 22 November – Mike Bickle, 79, English footballer (Plymouth Argyle, Gillingham). (death announced on this date)
- 23 November – Russell Norman, 57, English restaurateur and chef (Saturday Kitchen).
- 24 November
  - Henry Tilly, 91, English cricketer.
  - Derek Wilford, 90, British military officer, complications from Parkinson's disease.
- 25 November
  - Martin Lockley, 73, Welsh palaeontologist.
  - Les Maguire, 81, English musician (Gerry and the Pacemakers).
  - Terry Venables, 80, English football player (Chelsea, Tottenham Hotspur) and manager (national team).
- 26 November
  - Brian Godding, 78, Welsh jazz rock guitarist (Blossom Toes, Centipede).
  - Norman Irons, 82, Scottish councillor and honorary consul, lord provost of Edinburgh (1992–1996).
  - Geordie Walker, 64, English guitarist (Killing Joke).
- 28 November
  - James Douglas-Hamilton, Baron Selkirk of Douglas, 81, Scottish politician, MP (1974–1997), MSP (1999–2007) and member of the House of Lords (1997–2023).
  - Rod Fletcher, 78, English footballer (Scunthorpe United, Lincoln City, Grimsby Town). (death announced on this date)
  - Allan Rogers, 91, Labour Party politician, MP (1983–2001) and MEP (1979–1984).
  - Cecil Sandford, 95, British motorcycle road racer, Grand Prix World Riders' Champion (1952, 1957). (death announced on this date)
- 29 November
  - James Couchman, 81, British politician, MP (1983–1997).
  - Dean Sullivan, 68, English actor (Brookside).
- 30 November
  - John Byrne, 83, Scottish playwright (The Slab Boys Trilogy, Tutti Frutti, Your Cheatin' Heart) and designer.
  - Alistair Darling, Baron Darling of Roulanish, 70, British politician, chancellor of the Exchequer (2007–2010), MP (1987–2015) and member of the House of Lords (2015–2020), cancer.
  - Shane MacGowan, 65, English-born Irish singer (The Pogues, Shane MacGowan and the Popes) and songwriter ("Fairytale of New York").

== December ==
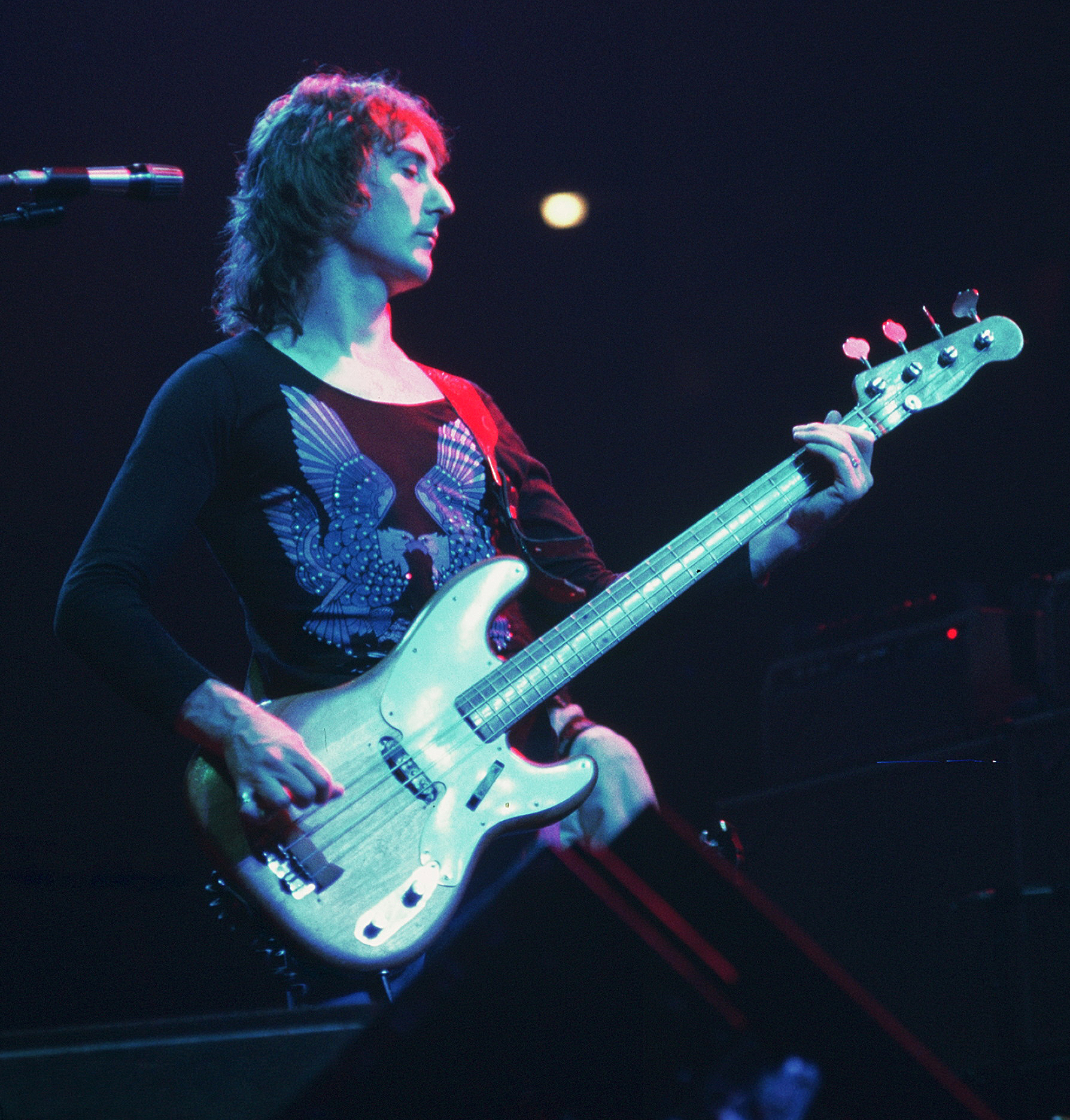
Denny Laine in 1976

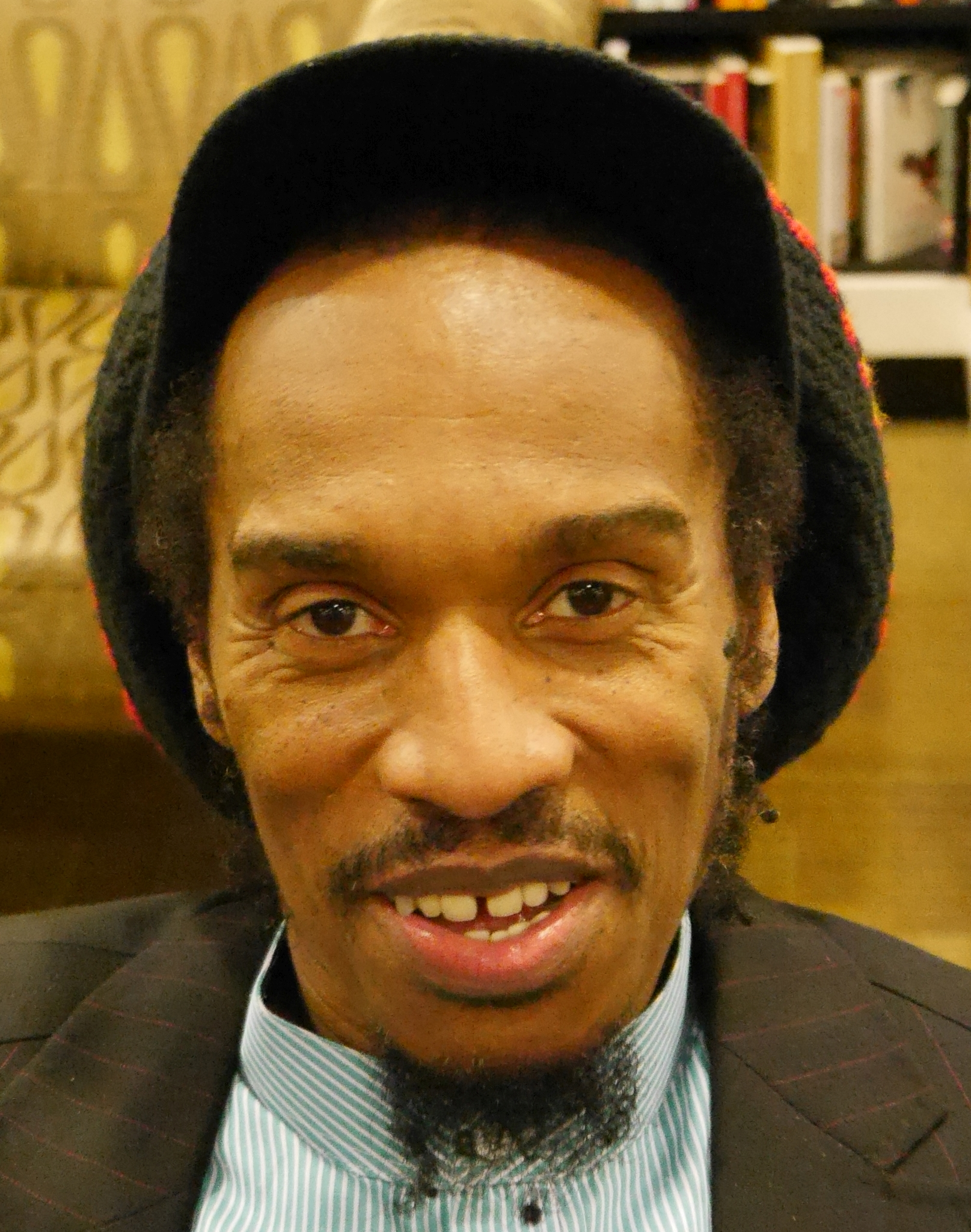
Benjamin Zephaniah in 2018

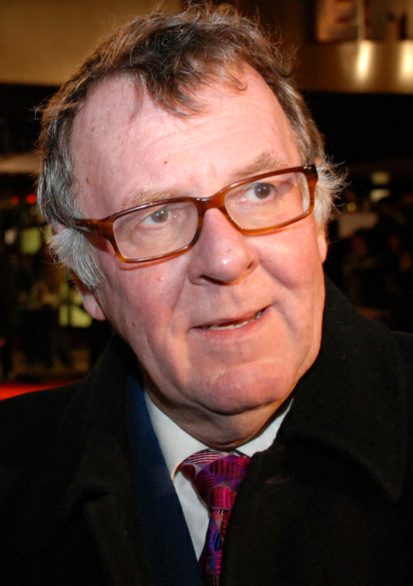
Tom Wilkinson in 2011

- 1 December
  - Tony Allen, 78, English comedian and writer.
  - Shaun Davis, 57, British bodybuilder, Mr. Universe winner (1996). (death announced on this date)
  - Brigit Forsyth, 83, Scottish actress (Whatever Happened to the Likely Lads?, Boon, Still Open All Hours).
  - Winston Churchill Rea, 70s, Northern Irish loyalist. (death announced on this date)
- 3 December – Glenys Kinnock, 79, British politician, MEP (1994–2009), member of the House of Lords (2009–2021), and minister of state for Europe (2009).
- 4 December – Sophie Anderson, 36, British pornographic actress, recording artist, and Internet personality. (death announced on this date)
- 5 December
  - Denny Laine, 79, English Hall of Fame musician (Wings, The Moody Blues) and songwriter ("Mull of Kintyre").
  - Martin Patching, 65, English footballer (Wolverhampton Wanderers, Watford, Northampton Town). (death announced on this date)
- 7 December – Benjamin Zephaniah, 65, British actor (Peaky Blinders) and poet.
- 10 December
  - Jonathan Irwin, 82, British-Irish auctioneer and philanthropist.
  - Willie McCulloch, 75, Scottish football player (Alloa Athletic, Airdrieonians) and manager (Cowdenbeath). (death announced on this date)
  - Syd Millar, 89, Northern Irish rugby union player (Ballymena, Ireland national team), coach (British & Irish Lions), and executive, chairman of the IRB (2003–2007). (death announced on this date)
- 11 December
  - Shirley Anne Field, 87, English actress (The Entertainer, The Damned, Alfie).
  - Ian Gibson, 77, British comic book artist (2000 AD, Judge Dredd, The Ballad of Halo Jones), cancer.
  - Richard Kerr, 78, English singer, songwriter ("Mandy", "I'll Never Love This Way Again", "Looks Like We Made It") and composer. (death announced on this date)
  - John "Rambo" Stevens, English music producer and manager.
- 12 December
  - Shirley Barber, 88, English author.
  - Richard Gaddes, 81, English arts administrator (Santa Fe Opera, Opera Theater of St. Louis).
- 14 December – Hanzala Malik, 67, Scottish politician, MSP (2011–2016). (death announced on this date)
- 15 December
  - Sir Timothy Brighouse, 83, British educator.
  - Steve Halliwell, 77, English actor (Heartbeat, Coronation Street, Emmerdale).
- 17 December
  - Mike Maxfield, 79, English songwriter and guitarist (The Dakotas). (death announced on this date)
  - Roy Roebuck, 94, British journalist (News Chronicle, Daily Express) and politician, MP (1966–1970).
- 18 December
  - Ronnie Caryl, 70, English guitarist (Flaming Youth, Phil Collins).
  - Brian Price, 86, Welsh rugby union player (Newport, British Lions, national team).
- 19 December – Sir Norman Arthur, 92, British military officer and Olympic equestrian (1960), GOC Scotland (1985–1988) and Lord Lieutenant of Kirkcudbright (1996–2006). (death announced on this date)
- 20 December – Pat Quartermain, 86, English footballer (Oxford United, Cambridge United). (death announced on this date)
- 21 December – Oliver Emanuel, 43, English playwright and radio dramatist. (death announced on this date)
- 22 December
  - Oliver Everett, 80, British diplomat and public servant, Royal Librarian (1985–2002).
  - Ian Pepperell, 53, British actor (The Archers, EastEnders).
- 23 December – Richard Rampton, 82, British libel lawyer.
- 24 December – David Leland, 82, British film and television director (Wish You Were Here, The Big Man, Band of Brothers, The Borgias).
- 25 December
  - Jim Breaks, 83, British professional wrestler.
  - Richard Franklin, 87, actor (Doctor Who, Emmerdale).
  - Tom Priestley, 91, British film editor (Whistle Down the Wind, Unearthly Stranger, This Sporting Life).
  - Henry Sandon, 95, English antiques expert (Antiques Roadshow).
- 26 December
  - David Kernan, 85, British actor (Mix Me a Person, Zulu, Carry On Abroad).
  - Tony Oxley, 85, English free improvising drummer, co-founder of Incus Records.
- 27 December
  - Jack McLean, 78, Scottish journalist and art teacher.
  - Leonard Singer, 80, British-born Manx politician, Member of the House of Keys (2001–2006, 2011–2016). (death announced on this date)
- 28 December – Patrick Walsh, 92, Northern Irish Roman Catholic prelate, bishop of Down and Connor (1991–2008).
- 29 December – Kurtis Chapman, 26, English professional wrestler. (death announced on this date)
- 30 December
  - Bryan Ansell, 68, British role-playing game designer (Warhammer 40,000).
  - John Pilger, 84, British-based Australian documentary filmmaker (Year Zero: The Silent Death of Cambodia, Death of a Nation, The Secret Country: The First Australians Fight Back) and journalist.
  - Tom Wilkinson, 75, English actor (The Full Monty, In the Bedroom, Michael Clayton).
