= Deaths in October 2023 =

The following is a list of notable deaths in October 2023.

Entries for each day are listed alphabetically by surname. A typical entry lists information in the following sequence:

- Name, age, country of citizenship at birth, subsequent country of citizenship (if applicable), reason for notability, cause of death (if known), and reference.

== October 2023 ==
=== 1 ===
- Jake Abraham, 56, British actor (Lock, Stock and Two Smoking Barrels, Mean Machine, The 51st State), prostate cancer.
- Lars Arnesson, 87, Swedish football player (Djurgårdens IF) and manager (Östers IF, national team).
- Julian Bahula, 85, South African drummer, composer and bandleader (Jabula).
- Wilf Billington, 93, English footballer (Workington, Blackburn Rovers).
- Nikolai Bulgakov, 63, Russian football player (Iskra Smolensk, CSKA Moscow, Kristall Smolensk) and manager.
- Eve Bunting, 94, Northern Irish-born American author (Smoky Night, The Presence: A Ghost Story), pneumonia.
- David Burrell, 90, American academic and theologian.
- Jim Caple, 61, American sports journalist (ESPN.com) and writer, complications from amyotrophic lateral sclerosis and dementia.
- Russ Francis, 70, football player (New England Patriots, San Francisco 49ers), plane crash.
- Ron Haffkine, 84, American record producer and music manager (Dr. Hook & the Medicine Show), leukemia and kidney failure.
- Kenneth Horsnell, 90, Australian cricketer (South Australia).
- Patricia Janečková, 25, Slovak soprano, breast cancer.
- Kim Yong-il, 76, North Korean diplomat and politician. (death announced on this date)
- Theresa Kufuor, 87, Ghanaian nurse, first lady (2001–2009).
- Doug Larsen, 47, American politician, member of the North Dakota Senate (since 2020), plane crash.
- Richard J. Lesniak, 84, American politician, member of the Indiana House of Representatives (1968–1972).
- Sir Christopher Lewinton, 91, British-American businessman.
- Joyce Currie Little, 89, American computer scientist.
- Frank McDougall, 65, Scottish footballer (Clydebank, St Mirren, Aberdeen), heart disease.
- Richard McSpadden, 63, American educator and USAF pilot, commander of Thunderbirds, plane crash.
- Enoch Teye Mensah, 77, Ghanaian politician, MP (1997–2017).
- Robert Misrahi, 97, French philosopher.
- Elinés Olivero, 21, Venezuelan military officer.
- Peter Penfold, 79, British diplomat, governor of the Virgin Islands (1991–1996) and high commissioner to Sierra Leone (1997–2000), cancer.
- Nikolay Pivovarov, 92, Russian engineer and politician, member of the Supreme Soviet of Russia (1980–1990).
- George Reed, 83, American Hall of Fame football player (Saskatchewan Roughriders).
- Tripurari Sharma, 67, Indian playwright, stage director and screenwriter (Mirch Masala, Sanshodhan).
- Roberto Thieme, 80, Chilean political activist.
- Tim Wakefield, 57, American baseball player (Boston Red Sox, Pittsburgh Pirates) and commentator (NESN), brain cancer.
- John Waring, 81, English cricketer (Yorkshire, Warwickshire).
- Claudius E. Watts III, 87, American Air Force general, president of The Citadel (1989–1996).
- Beverly Willis, 95, American architect (San Francisco Ballet Building), complications from Parkinson's disease.

=== 2 ===
- Kevin M. Birmingham, 51, American Roman Catholic prelate, auxiliary bishop of Chicago (since 2020).
- Guy Briet, 87, French football manager (Saint-Étienne, Tours).
- Mack C. Chase, 92, American petroleum businessman.
- Casey Cox, 82, American baseball player (Washington Senators/Texas Rangers, New York Yankees).
- Marie-Daniel Dadiet, 71, Ivorian Roman Catholic prelate, bishop of Katiola (2002–2004) and archbishop of Korhogo (2004–2017).
- Lynn Eves, 81, Canadian Olympic sprinter (1960).
- Mel Fitzgerald, 70, Canadian wheelchair racer, three-time Paralympic champion (1980, 1984), cardiovascular disease.
- Herbert Handt, 97, American operatic tenor and conductor.
- Lefteris Hapsiadis, 69, Greek lyricist.
- Syed Amir Ali Shah Jamote, 82, Pakistani politician, MNA (2002–2018).
- James Jorden, 69, American journalist and music critic (Parterre Box).
- Firdaus Khisamitdinova, 73, Russian Bashkir linguist and politician, minister of education of Bashkortostan (1995–1998).
- Josh Kruger, 39, American journalist (The Philadelphia Inquirer) and activist, shot.
- Trienke Laurie, 77, South African poet.
- Francis Lee, 79, English football player (Manchester City, Bolton Wanderers, national team) and chairman, cancer.
- David H. Montplaisir, 87, American politician, member of the North Dakota House of Representatives (1965–1966).
- Frangkiskos Papamanolis, 86, Greek Latin Catholic prelate, bishop of Syros and Milos (1974–2014) and of Santorini (1974–2014).
- Harriet Pattison, 94, American landscape architect (Kimbell Art Museum).
- Satyaram Reang, 80, Indian dancer and folk artist.
- Njeri Rionge, 57, Kenyan technology entrepreneur.
- Richard Salzmann, 94, Czech banker and politician, senator (1996–2000).
- Petar Sarić, 86, Serbian poet and prose writer.
- Herbert Schambeck, 89, Austrian legal scholar and politician, MP (1969–1997).
- Alice Shalvi, 96, German-born Israeli professor and educator.
- Umaru Shehu, 92, Nigerian physician and academic administrator, vice-chancellor of the University of Nigeria (1978–1979).
- Hampton Smith, 89, American football coach (Albany State Golden Rams).
- Naoki Takashima, 73, Japanese politician, president of the Tokyo Metropolitan Assembly (2014–2015).
- Geneviève Viney, 86, French law professor and jurist.
- Gord Wilson, 91, Canadian ice hockey player (Boston Bruins).

=== 3 ===
- Arthur Burns, 60, British historian, cancer.
- Joe Christopher, 87, American baseball player (Pittsburgh Pirates, New York Mets, Boston Red Sox).
- Jacqueline Dark, 55, Australian opera singer, cancer.
- Jean-Pierre Elkabbach, 86, French journalist (France 2, France 3, Europe 1).
- Jennie M. Forehand, 87, American politician, member of the Maryland Senate (1995–2015) and House of Delegates (1978–1994), complications from Alzheimer's disease.
- Thomas Gambino, 94, American mobster (Gambino crime family).
- Edward Hagedorn, 76, Filipino politician, member of the House of Representatives (since 2022) and mayor of Puerto Princesa (1992–2001, 2002–2013), pancreatic cancer.
- Avgust Ipavec, 83, Slovenian-Austrian Roman Catholic priest and composer.
- Johannes Kühn, 89, German poet.
- Patrice Lecornu, 65, French football player (Angers, national team) and manager (Red Star).
- Lena McLin, 95, American music teacher, composer and pastor.
- Marina Mizzau, 87, Italian writer and essayist.
- Howard Murphy, 79, American football coach (Westfield State).
- Garry Nehl, 89, Australian politician, MP (1984–2001).
- Hitoshi Nomura, 78, Japanese artist, pneumonia.
- Carlos Oliveira, 80, Portuguese Olympic rower (1972).
- Giulio Quercini, 81, Italian journalist (Rinascita) and politician, deputy (1987–1992).
- Harald Tusberg, 88, Norwegian television presenter (NRK).
- Jacques Valade, 93, French politician, deputy (1970–1973) and senator (1980–1987, 1989–2008).
- Bob Wagner, 76, American football coach (Hawaii Rainbow Warriors).
- Khoshbakht Yusifzadeh, 93, Azerbaijani geologist, member of the Azerbaijan National Academy of Sciences.

=== 4 ===
- David Benedictus, 85, English novelist (The Fourth of June, This Animal Is Mischievous, Return to the Hundred Acre Wood).
- Wayne Comer, 79, American baseball player (Detroit Tigers, Milwaukee Brewers, Washington Senators).
- József Csík, 77, Hungarian Olympic javelin thrower (1972).
- Tracey Freeman, 75, Australian athlete, six-time Paralympic champion (1972, 1976).
- Luis Giampietri, 82, Peruvian military officer and politician, first vice president (2006–2011) and MP (2006–2011).
- Pat Hays, 76, American politician, mayor of North Little Rock, Arkansas (1989–2013) and member of the Arkansas House of Representatives (1987–1989).
- Murílio de Avellar Hingel, 90, Brazilian geographer and politician, minister of education (1992–1995).
- Tommy Hoyland, 91, English footballer (Sheffield United, Bradford City).
- Giannis Ioannidis, 78, Greek basketball player and coach (Aris, Olympiacos, national team).
- P. Jayadevi, Indian film director (Vilangu, Power of Women) and screenwriter (Puratchikkaaran).
- Sepp Klasen, 88, German lawyer and politician, member of the Landtag of Bavaria (1970–1990).
- Kamchy Kolbayev, 49, Kyrgyz crime boss, shot.
- Yosef Mahalal, 83, Israeli footballer (Bnei Yehuda, Hapoel Ashkelon, national team).
- Héctor Mayagoitia Domínguez, 100, Mexican bacteriologist and politician, governor of Durango (1974–1979).
- Rives McBee, 84, American golfer.
- Felice De Nicolò, 81, Italian Olympic alpine skier (1960, 1964).
- Ivan Nikitchuk, 79, Russian politician, MP (1995–2003, 2011–2016).
- Felix Owusu-Adjapong, 79, Ghanaian politician, MP (1997–2009), minister of transport (2001–2003) and energy (2008–2009).
- Dominique Perrier, 72–73, French electronic musician and composer (Space Art, Stone Age).
- Mahinder Rathipal, 67, Surinamese politician, MP (2000–2015).
- Boris M. Schein, 85, Russian-American mathematician.
- Telesphore Toppo, 83, Indian Roman Catholic cardinal, bishop of Dumka (1979–1984) and archbishop of Ranchi (1984–2008).
- Shawna Trpcic, 56, American costume designer (Mighty Morphin Power Rangers, Angel, Ahsoka).
- George Tyndall, 74, American gynecologist.
- Claus Wisser, 81, German businessman and arts patron (Rheingau Musik Festival).
- Jason Wynyard, 49, New Zealand woodchopper, Burkitt lymphoma.

=== 5 ===
- Ibrahim Amin, Egyptian squash player.
- Anathalavattom Anandan, 86, Indian politician, Kerala MLA (1987–1991, 1996–2001, 2006–2011).
- Jon Beare, 49, Canadian rower, Olympic bronze medalist (2008).
- Dick Butkus, 80, American Hall of Fame football player (Chicago Bears) and actor (Hang Time, Johnny Dangerously).
- Jacques Chonchol, 97, Chilean politician, minister of agriculture (1970–1972).
- Asad Chowdhury, 80, Bangladeshi poet.
- Kevin Coombs, 82, Australian Paralympic wheelchair basketball player.
- Giuseppe Da Prato, 87, Italian academic and mathematician.
- Bruno Filippini, 78, Italian singer.
- David G. Gee, 85, British-born Swedish geologist.
- Robert J. Hermann, 90, American public servant.
- Taj El-Din Hilaly, 82, Egyptian Islamic cleric, grand mufti of Australia (1988–2007).
- Zorica Jevremović, 75, Serbian theatre director, playwright and choreographer.
- Piotr Klemensiewicz, 67, French painter and sculptor.
- Jordan Levy, 79, American radio host (WTAG) and politician, mayor of Worcester, Massachusetts (1980–1981, 1988–1993).
- Peter Mack, 68, British scholar, traffic collision.
- Edmund Marshall, 83, British politician, MP (1971–1983).
- Francesco Matrone, 76, Italian mobster (Camorra).
- Bill Munro, 89, Scottish football player (Barrow) and manager (Clydebank, Airdrieonians).
- Risto Näätänen, 84, Finnish psychologist.
- Thor Nilsen, 92, Norwegian Olympic rower (1952).
- Larisa Opanasyuk, 60, Russian politician.
- Paul Ramboux, 91, Belgian cartoonist (Spirou).
- Panny Rhodes, 81, American politician.
- Sir Nicholas Stadlen, 73, British judge, mesothelioma.
- Panos Theodorou, 29, Cypriot footballer (Aris Limassol, AEL Limassol, Apollon Limassol).
- Romano Voltolina, 85, Italian footballer (Juventus, Biellese, Cesena).

=== 6 ===
- Moreira Alves, 90, Brazilian academic and magistrate, prosecutor general (1972–1975), justice (1975–2003) and president (1985–1987) of the Supreme Federal Court.
- Bev Bentley, 96, Canadian ice hockey player (Saskatoon Quakers, Vancouver Canucks, San Francisco Seals).
- Maurice Bourgue, 83, French oboist (Orchestre de Paris), composer, and academic teacher (Conservatoire de Paris, Conservatoire de Genève).
- Michael Chiarello, 61, American chef, anaphylaxis.
- Mary Chronopoulou, 90, Greek actress (The Naked Brigade, Mermaids and Rascals, Voyage to Cythera), complications from a fall.
- Nicholas Crafts, 74, British economist, sepsis.
- Loren Cunningham, 88, American missionary leader (Youth with a Mission), co-founder of the University of the Nations.
- Đào Nguyên Cát, 96, Vietnamese economist, founder of Vietnam Economic Times.
- Stelios Faitakis, 47, Greek painter and graffiti artist.
- Daniel Giraud, 77, French essayist, poet, and translator, suicide.
- Roger Greenhalgh, 82, British academic and writer.
- Rupert Hoilette, 77, Jamaican Olympic sprinter (1964).
- Tetsundo Iwakuni, 87, Japanese politician, MP (1996–2009).
- Victoire Jasmin, 67, Guadeloupean politician, senator (2017–2023).
- Vilém Mandlík, 87, Czech Olympic sprinter (1956, 1960).
- Vincent Patrick, 88, American author and screenwriter (The Pope of Greenwich Village, Family Business, The Devil's Own), complications from Lewy body dementia.
- Atila Pesyani, 66, Iranian actor (The Redemption, Cease Fire, The Hidden Half), stomach cancer.
- Jim Poole, 57, American baseball player (Baltimore Orioles, Cleveland Indians, San Francisco Giants), complications from amyotrophic lateral sclerosis.
- Bodo Schümann, 86, German theologian and politician, member of the Hamburg Parliament (1974–1986).
- Susan Thomas, Baroness Thomas of Walliswood, 87, British businesswoman and politician, member of the House of Lords (1994–2016).
- Esme Timbery, 92, Australian Bidjigal artist and shellworker.
- Francisco Vidal, 82, Spanish actor (El Crack, The Enchanted Forest, Pan's Labyrinth).
- Dorel Zamfir, 62, Romanian footballer (Argeș Pitești, Constanța, Dinamo București).

=== 7 ===
- Peter Akatsa, 63, Kenyan Olympic field hockey player (1984, 1988), colon cancer.
- Marouf al-Bakhit, 76, Jordanian military officer and politician, prime minister (2005–2007, 2011).
- Terence Davies, 77, British screenwriter and film director (Distant Voices, Still Lives, The Long Day Closes, The House of Mirth), cancer.
- Awni El-Dous, 12–13, Palestinian YouTuber, airstrike.
- Richard Eppley, 91, American biological oceanographer.
- Reiner Goldberg, 83, German operatic heldentenor (Berlin State Opera).
- Luca Goldoni, 95, Italian writer and journalist (Gazzetta di Parma, Il Resto del Carlino, Corriere della Sera).
- Eric Griffin, 55, American Olympic boxer (1992).
- Anna Gutu, 31–32, Ukrainian-born American mountaineer, avalanche.
- Anthony Holden, 76, British writer (Big Deal: A Year as a Professional Poker Player, Bigger Deal), broadcaster and critic, brain cancer and complications from a stroke.
- Brian Iwata, 75, American psychologist.
- Loyal Jones, 95, American folklorist.
- Phyllis Latour, 102, South African-born New Zealand intelligence officer (SOE).
- Kęstutis Lupeikis, 61, Lithuanian architect and painter.
- Georgina Mello, 69, Cape Verdean economist.
- Noh In-hwan, 91, South Korean politician, MP (1979–1980, 1988–1996).
- Chris Ogunbanjo, 99, Nigerian corporate lawyer and philanthropist.
- Park Jong-hwan, 85, South Korean football manager (Seoul City, Ilhwa Chunma, national team).
- Oldřich Pelčák, 79, Czech cosmonaut (Soyuz 28).
- Gina Marie Rzucidlo, 45, American mountaineer, avalanche.
- Ted Schwinden, 98, American politician, governor (1981–1989) and lieutenant governor (1977–1981) of Montana, member of the Montana House of Representatives (1959–1963).
- Omar Abu Shawish, 36, Palestinian poet and novelist, airstrike.
- Tenjen Sherpa, 35, Nepalese mountaineer, avalanche.
- Ellen Tittel, 75, German Olympic runner (1972, 1976).
- Tjerk Westerterp, 92, Dutch politician, four-time MP, minister of transport and water management (1973–1977), and MEP (1967–1971).
- Israeli people killed in the 7 October attacks include but not limited to:
  - Lior Asulin, 43, footballer (Maccabi Herzliya, Beitar Jerusalem, Hapoel Petah Tikva)
  - Jayar Davidov, chief superintendent, commander of the Israel Police in Rahat (since 2022)
  - Roy Edan, 45, photojournalist
  - Eli Ginsberg, 42, lieutenant colonel, commander of LOTAR (2020–2023)
  - Asaf Hamami, 40, colonel, commander of the Southern Brigade
  - Hayim Katsman, 32, peace activist and academic
  - Tamar Kedem Siman-Tov, 35, artist and political activist
  - Roi Levy, 44, colonel, commander of the Multidimensional Unit (since 2023)
  - Ofir Libstein, 49–50, politician, head of the Sha'ar HaNegev Regional Council (since 2018)
  - Shani Louk, 23, tattoo artist and social media influencer
  - Izhar Peled, 61–62, assistant commissioner, commander of Israel Border Police in the West Bank (2016–2020)
  - Vivian Silver, 74, peace activist and women's rights activist
  - Yonatan Steinberg, 43, colonel, commander of the Nahal Brigade (since 2023)
  - Yahav Winner, 37, filmmaker

=== 8 ===
- Agneta Andersson, 62, Swedish sprint canoer, three-time Olympic champion (1984, 1996), cancer.
- Alcides Báez, 76, Paraguayan footballer (Libertad, Cerro Porteño, national team).
- Yannick Bodin, 81, French politician, senator (2004–2011).
- Fred Boyd, 73, American basketball player (Philadelphia 76ers, New Orleans Jazz).
- Karlos Callens, 76, Belgian politician, member of the Flemish Parliament (2002–2014).
- Aldo Cosentino, 75, French Olympic boxer (1968, 1972, 1976).
- David Dollar, 68, American economist.
- Ron Erickson, 90, American politician.
- Gérard Fenouil, 78, French sprinter, Olympic bronze medalist (1968).
- Bret Gilliam, 72, American technical diver, complications from a stroke.
- Maude Jacques, 31, Canadian Paralympic wheelchair basketball player (2012), bacterial infection.
- James P. Kauahikaua, 72, American geophysicist and volcanologist.
- Sir Thomas Legg, 88, British civil servant, Clerk of the Crown in Chancery (1989–1998).
- Jacques Lucan, 75, French academic and architect.
- Marco Martinelli, 60, Italian consultant and politician, deputy (2006–2018).
- Nina Matviienko, 75, Ukrainian singer.
- Billy Emory Maxwell, 80, American track and field coach.
- André Monnier, 97, French Olympic ski jumper (1952, 1956).
- Didier Mouly, 72, French lawyer and politician, mayor of Narbonne (since 2014), cancer.
- Jeff Peterek, 60, American baseball player (Milwaukee Brewers).
- Herschel Savage, 70, American pornographic actor (Debbie Does Dallas, Memphis Cathouse Blues, The Texas Vibrator Massacre) and director.
- László Sólyom, 81, Hungarian jurist and politician, president (2005–2010) and president of the Constitutional Court (1990–1998).
- Shinji Tanimura, 74, Japanese singer-songwriter.
- Dunc Wilson, 75, Canadian ice hockey player (Vancouver Canucks, Toronto Maple Leafs, Pittsburgh Penguins).
- Burt Young, 83, American actor (Rocky, Chinatown, Back to School), cardiac arrest.

=== 9 ===
- Alim Abdallah, 40, Israeli lieutenant colonel, deputy commander of IDF 91st Division.
- Haluk Akakçe, 53, Turkish contemporary artist, lung cancer.
- Jackson Anthony, 65, Sri Lankan actor (Gini Avi Saha Gini Keli, Guerilla Marketing) and film director (Julietge Bhumikawa), complications from a traffic collision.
- Ottar Befring, 83, Norwegian politician, governor of Møre og Romsdal (2002–2009).
- Andrea Branzi, 84, Italian architect.
- Greg Butcher, 71, American politician, member of the West Virginia House of Delegates.
- Chau Cham-son, 91, Hong Kong town planner and civil servant, director of Buildings and Lands (1986–1989) and chief commissioner of the Scout Association (1985–1996).
- Simone Chapuis-Bischof, 92, Swiss women's rights activist.
- Terry Dischinger, 82, American basketball player (Chicago Zephyrs, Detroit Pistons, Portland Trail Blazers), Olympic champion (1960).
- Chuck Feeney, 92, American travel retailer and philanthropist, founder of DFS Group and Atlantic Philanthropies.
- Keith Giffen, 70, American comic book artist and writer (Blue Beetle, Justice League), co-creator of Rocket Raccoon, stroke.
- Mikhail Golubovich, 79, Ukrainian actor (Lone Wolf, Luna Park, Brothel Lights).
- Gerhard Grimmer, 80, German Olympic cross-country skier (1968, 1972, 1976).
- Viktor Guz, 52, Russian football player (Torpedo Volzhsky, Gazovik Orenburg) and manager (Zhemchuzhina-Sochi).
- Anthony Hickox, 64, English film director and screenwriter (Waxwork, Sundown: The Vampire in Retreat, Prince Valiant).
- Jorge Lavelli, 90, French theater and opera director.
- Lars Lunøe, 87, Danish actor (Doctor Glas, Tough Guys of the Prairie, Ghost Train International).
- Steven Lutvak, 64, American musician and composer (A Gentleman's Guide to Love and Murder), pulmonary embolism.
- Mang Hoi, 65, Hong Kong actor (The Human Goddess, Bruce Lee, D-Day at Macao, Warriors Two), oesophageal cancer.
- Lino Montiel Forzano, 99, Argentine army general, governor of Tucumán Province (1978–1980). (death announced on this date)
- Mauro Morelli, 88, Brazilian Roman Catholic prelate, bishop of Duque de Caxias (1981–2005) and auxiliary bishop of São Paulo (1975–1981).
- Jan Needle, 80, English author.
- Raymond O'Connor, 71, American actor (The Rock, L.A. Noire, Drowning Mona), bladder cancer.
- Críostóir Ó Floinn, 95, Irish writer.
- Agnes Odhiambo, Kenyan human rights activist. (death announced on this date)
- Yulian Panich, 92, Russian actor (Road to Life, Different Fortunes, The Green Carriage), television director and journalist.
- Evangelos Pentaris, 90, Greek naval captain and politician, MP (1981–1989).
- Kevin Phillips, 82, American political commentator (NOW on PBS) and writer (American Theocracy), complications from Alzheimer's disease.
- Petar Porobić, 66, Montenegrin water polo player and coach (China women's national team).
- Eleni Potari, 41, Greek Olympic handball player (2004), cancer.
- Henri Serre, 92, French actor (Jules and Jim, Fantômas contre Scotland Yard, Mister Frost).
- Buck Trent, 85, American country musician and television personality (Hee Haw).
- Volodymyr Vasylenko, 86, Ukrainian diplomat, ambassador to the United Kingdom (1998–2002).

=== 10 ===
- Karthyayani Amma, 101, Indian mature student, subject of Barefoot Empress.
- Roger Bedford Jr., 67, American politician, member of the Alabama Senate (1982–1990, 1994–2014).
- Jeff Burr, 60, American film director (Leatherface: The Texas Chainsaw Massacre III, Stepfather II, Puppet Master 4), complications from a stroke.
- Jean-Claude Cassini, 55, French cartoonist.
- Robert von Dassanowsky, 58, Austrian-American writer, historian, and film producer.
- Shirley Jo Finney, 74, American actress (Nashville Girl, Echo Park, Moving) and stage director, multiple myeloma.
- Mark Goddard, 87, American actor (Lost in Space, The Detectives, Blue Sunshine), pulmonary fibrosis.
- Martin Goetz, 93, American software engineer.
- Dawn Josephs, 91, Canadian Olympic athlete (1952).
- Kim Namjo, 96, South Korean poet.
- John Klenke, 65, American politician, member of the Wisconsin State Assembly (2011–2015).
- Eva Kollisch, 98, Austrian-American lesbian rights activist and writer.
- Dick Leach, 83, American tennis player and coach.
- James Lee, 86, Canadian politician, premier of Prince Edward Island (1981–1986) and MLA (1975–1986).
- Paul Leuquet, 90, French painter, cartoonist, and poet.
- Brendan Malone, 81, American basketball coach (Rhode Island Rams, Detroit Pistons, Toronto Raptors).
- Louise Meriwether, 100, American author (Daddy Was a Number Runner) and activist.
- Toshio Naka, 87, Japanese baseball player (Chunichi Dragons) and manager.
- Dónal O'Neill, 56, Irish Gaelic footballer (Offaly, Edenderry).
- Gail O'Neill, 61, American model and journalist (The Early Show).
- Willy Pfund, 84, Swiss politician, member of the National Council (1983–1987).
- Olle Wästberg, 78, Swedish journalist (Expressen), diplomat, and politician, MP (1976–1982).
- Vjeran Zuppa, 83, Croatian dramaturge, literature theorist, and poet.

=== 11 ===
- Martin Aigner, 81, Austrian mathematician.
- Michael P. C. Carns, 86, American general.
- Manuel Chuanguira Machado, 73, Mozambican Roman Catholic prelate, bishop of Gurué (1994–2009).
- Doug Clark, 75, American serial killer.
- Phyllis Coates, 96, American actress (Adventures of Superman, Superman and the Mole Men, Goodnight, Sweet Marilyn).
- Walt Garrison, 79, American football player (Dallas Cowboys).
- D. J. Gokulakrishnan, 50, Indian cricketer (Tamil Nadu, Goa, Assam), heart attack.
- Guo Baochang, 83, Chinese film and television director (The Grand Mansion Gate), screenwriter and actor (The Blue Kite).
- Rainer Gut, 91, Swiss bank manager, chairman of Credit Suisse (1983–2000).
- Samuel C. O. Holt, 87, American radio and television executive.
- Rudolph Isley, 84, American Hall of Fame singer (The Isley Brothers) and songwriter ("It's Your Thing", "That Lady"), heart attack.
- Pauline Jani, 34, Zimbabwean netball player (national team).
- Jim Jensen, 89, American politician, member of Nebraska Legislature (1994–2006) and contractor.
- Mohamed Kabil, 96, Egyptian footballer (national team).
- Virginia Lovo, 31, Nicaraguan footballer (national team), cancer.
- Gérard Murillo, 91, French rugby union player (Stade Dijonnais, national team).
- Rosemarie Myrdal, 94, American politician, lieutenant governor of North Dakota (1992–2000).
- Aérea Negrot, 43, Venezuelan electronic musician and singer (Hercules and Love Affair).
- Audrey Salkeld, 87, English mountaineer and historian.
- Ian Spink, 76, Australian-British choreographer, lung cancer.
- Markku Syrjälä, 68, Finnish Olympic archer (1984).
- Cynthia Whittaker, 82, American academic and author.
- Cal Wilson, 53, New Zealand comedian and voice actress (Kitty Is Not a Cat), cancer.

=== 12 ===
- Mir Shamsuddin Adib-Soltani, 92, Iranian philosopher and translator.
- Peter Antoine, 79, German football player (Bayern Munich) and manager (Mjällby, Assyriska FF), pneumonia.
- Michael Cooper, 71, Jamaican musician (Inner Circle, Third World), cancer.
- Álvaro Correia, 90, Brazilian journalist and politician, Santa Catarina MLA (1975–1987).
- Howard Forman, 77, American politician, member of the Florida Senate (1989–2000).
- Luis Garavito, 66, Colombian serial killer and rapist.
- René Garrec, 88, French politician, senator (1998–2014).
- Per Egil Hegge, 83, Norwegian journalist (Aftenposten, A-magasinet).
- Jon Hustad, 55, Norwegian journalist.
- Jang Young-chul, 86, South Korean politician, MP (1988–2000), minister of labor (1988–1989).
- Gunnar Kaiser, 47, German writer and political blogger, cancer.
- Neil Le Bihan, 47, English footballer (Peterborough United, Dover Athletic, Crawley Town), suicide.
- Alice Mabota, 74, Mozambican human rights activist.
- Kurt Mattsson, 83, Finnish Olympic boxer (1964).
- Jean-Roger Milo, 66, French actor (The Woman Cop, A Sunday in the Country, Germinal).
- Hisaya Nakajo, 50, Japanese manga artist (Hana-Kimi), heart disease.
- Tom O'Lincoln, 76, American Marxist historian and author.
- Carol Page, 74, British Olympic sport shooter (1984, 1996).
- Lara Parker, 84, American actress (Dark Shadows, Save the Tiger, Hi, Mom!), cancer.
- Guy Ravier, 85, French politician, mayor of Avignon (1989–1995).
- Tero Rönni, 69, Finnish politician, MP (1999–2011).
- Colette Rossant, 91, French-American restaurateur, breast cancer.
- Eva Rysová, 91, Slovak actress.
- Sartaj Singh, 83, Indian politician, MP (1989–1999, 2004–2009).
- Foster Stockwell, 94, American writer and historian.
- Andriy Vasylyshyn, 90, Ukrainian police officer, minister of the interior (1990–1994).
- Jean-Pierre Versini-Campinchi, 83, French lawyer.
- Igor Yevgrafov, 67, Russian swimmer.

=== 13 ===
- Astrid Achi, 62, Ecuadorian soprano singer, complications from surgery.
- Linda Arkley, 71, British politician, mayor of North Tyneside (2003–2005, 2009–2013).
- Benedict Birnberg, 93, British solicitor and human rights activist, pneumonia.
- Michael J. Bragman, 83, American politician, member (1981–2001) and majority leader (1993–2000) of the New York State Assembly.
- Leo Burke, 89, American baseball player (Chicago Cubs, Baltimore Orioles, California Angels).
- Sonia del Rio, 83, Canadian-Spanish classical dancer and ballerina.
- Ron Eachus, 76, American politician, member of the Oregon House of Representatives (1985–1987), heart failure.
- Sadao Fuchigami, 86, Japanese politician, MP (1989–2010), ureteral cancer.
- P. V. Gangadharan, 80, Indian film producer (Vartha, Thooval Kottaram, Achuvinte Amma).
- Louise Glück, 80, American poet (The Triumph of Achilles, The Wild Iris), Pulitzer Prize winner (1993), Nobel Prize laureate (2020), cancer.
- Friedrich Grade, 107, German engineer and naval officer (U-96, U-183).
- Burdette Haldorson, 89, American basketball player, Olympic champion (1956, 1960).
- Frank A. Herda, 76, American army soldier, Medal of Honor recipient.
- Jaakko Ihamuotila, 83, Finnish business executive, CEO of Valmet (1973–1979), president and chairman of Neste (1980–2000).
- Princess India, 94, Afghan royal.
- Michel Lapierre, 70, Canadian writer and journalist (L'aut'journal, Ici, La Presse).
- Garry Mapanzure, 25, Zimbabwean singer, traffic collision.
- Mauricio Molina, 56, Argentine golfer.
- Ronald M. Mottl, 89, American lawyer and politician, member of the U.S. House of Representatives (1975–1983), Ohio House of Representatives (1987–1997) and twice of Ohio Senate.
- Loren Parks, 97, American businessman.
- Ellinor Peerschke, 69, German-born American scientist.
- Hubert Reeves, 91, Canadian astrophysicist.
- João Luiz Ribeiro, 64, Brazilian Olympic gymnast (1980).
- Hugh Russell, 63, Northern Irish boxer, Olympic bronze medallist (1980).
- Rein Saluri, 84, Estonian writer and playwright.
- Bud Somerville, 86, American curler, Olympic bronze medalist (1992).
- Glorianne Stromberg, 84, Canadian lawyer.
- Sir Antony Walker, 89, British army general, commandant of the Royal College of Defence Studies (1990–1992), heart failure.
- Lois Wright, 95, American artist.
- Bello Maitama Yusuf, 76, Nigerian politician, minister of interior (1979–1981) and commerce (1982–1983), senator (1999–2007).
- People killed in the Gaza war:
  - Issam Abdallah, 37, Lebanese journalist (Reuters)
  - Ali Qadhi, Palestinian militant
  - Wael Al Zard, 50, Palestinian Islamic preacher and university professor

=== 14 ===
- Wadea al-Fayoume, 6, American child, stabbed.
- Lance Armstrong, 83, Australian politician, member of the Tasmanian House of Assembly (1989–1996).
- Andy Bean, 70, American professional golfer, complications from lung replacement surgery.
- María Alejandra Bruzual, 43, Venezuelan jockey, horse-riding accident.
- Giancarlo Cantelmi, 97, Italian lawyer and politician, deputy (1976–1983).
- Rosetta Cutolo, 86, Italian mobster (NCO).
- Klaus Höpcke, 89, German politician, member of the Landtag of Thuringia (1990–1999).
- Guy Latraverse, 84, Canadian artist agent, producer and show designer.
- Piper Laurie, 91, American actress (Carrie, The Hustler, Children of a Lesser God), Emmy winner (1987).
- Maurice W. Long, 98, American electrical engineer and physicist.
- Dariush Mehrjui, 83, Iranian filmmaker (The Cow, Mr. Naive, Hamoun), stabbed.
- Mei Tsu-lin, 90, Chinese-American linguist, member of Academia Sinica.
- Langhorne A. Motley, 85, American diplomat.
- Park Seo-bo, 91, South Korean painter, lung cancer.
- Joaquín Pérez, 86, Cuban Olympic rower (1956).
- Stanisław Radwan, 84, Polish composer.
- Gwyn Richards, 71, Welsh cricketer (Glamorgan).
- Roméo Savoie, 95, Canadian postwar and contemporary artist.
- Teodor Stanca, 90, Romanian engineer and politician, deputy (1996–2000).
- Jean-Charles Thomas, 93, French Roman Catholic prelate, auxiliary bishop of Aire and Dax (1972–1974), bishop of Ajaccio (1974–1986) and Versailles (1986–2001).
- Bill Turner, 79, American basketball player (Golden State Warriors, Cincinnati Royals, Los Angeles Lakers).
- Gastón Ugalde, 79, Bolivian visual artist.
- Gembong Warsono, 60, Indonesian politician, member of the Jakarta Regional House of Representatives (since 2014), heart attack.

=== 15 ===
- Oļegs Antropovs, 75, Latvian volleyball player and coach, Olympic champion (1968).
- Carmen Petra Basacopol, 97, Romanian composer.
- Dick Bielski, 91, American football player (Philadelphia Eagles, Dallas Cowboys) and coach (Baltimore Colts).
- Neal Brooks Biggers Jr., 88, American jurist, judge of the U.S. District Court for Southern Mississippi (since 1984).
- Tod Brown, 86, American Roman Catholic prelate, bishop of Boise City (1988–1998) and Orange in California (1998–2012).
- Omar Ferwana, 67, Palestinian gynaecologist and researcher, airstrike.
- M. S. Gill, 87, Indian civil servant and politician, chief election commissioner (1996–2001), MP (2004–2016) and minister of youth affairs and sports (2008–2011).
- Ghulam Nabi Khayal, 80, Indian poet and essayist.
- Giselle Khoury, 62, Lebanese journalist (BBC Arabic, Sky News Arabia), cancer.
- Jim Larkin, 77, Canadian politician, Prince Edward Island MLA (1979–1982), complications from Lewy body dementia.
- Carlos López, 97, Spanish Olympic equestrian (1956).
- Joanna Merlin, 92, American actress (Fiddler on the Roof, Mystic Pizza, Law & Order: Special Victims Unit).
- Milan, 54, Indian art director (Billa, Velayudham, Vedalam), heart attack.
- Jacques Pavlovsky, 92, French photojournalist.
- Todd Reynolds, 56, American Olympic pair skater (1994), heart attack.
- Gerry Ryan, 68, Irish footballer (Brighton & Hove Albion, Derby County, national team).
- Henrique de Carvalho Santos, 83, Angolan politician, co-designer of the flag of Angola.
- Torstein Seiersten, 92, Norwegian Olympic speed skater (1956, 1960).
- David Shaffer, 87, South African-born British-American physician and pediatrician, respiratory failure.
- Khamphoui Sisavatdy, 82, Laotian politician, prime minister (since 2003).
- Suzanne Somers, 76, American actress (Three's Company, Step by Step, She's the Sheriff), breast cancer.
- Teófilo Torres Corzo, 77, Mexican politician, MP (1985–1988, 2012–2015) and governor of San Luis Potosí (1992–1993).
- Mercedes Vostell, 90, Spanish writer.
- Alvin Yeryomin, 91, Russian economist and politician, member of the Supreme Soviet of Russia (1984–1989).

=== 16 ===
- Martti Ahtisaari, 86, Finnish politician, president (1994–2000), Nobel Prize laureate (2008), complications from Alzheimer's disease.
- Francisc Balla, 90, Romanian Olympic freestyle wrestler (1964, 1968).
- Hatto Beyerle, 90, German-Austrian chamber musician, conductor and academic.
- Paul Bryer, 65, English Anglican clergyman, archdeacon of Cornwall (since 2019).
- Malick Fall, 54, Senegalese footballer (Abbeville, Angers, national team).
- Gennady Gladkov, 88, Russian composer (The Bremen Town Musicians, Gentlemen of Fortune, A Man from the Boulevard des Capucines).
- Toon Greebe, 35, Dutch darts player.
- Roland Griffiths, 77, American psychopharmacologist, colon cancer.
- Jorge Guillén, 86, Spanish doctor and Olympic basketball player (1960).
- Jesús Guzmán, 97, Spanish actor (Implacable Three, The Locket, Nothing Less Than a Real Man).
- Hershel Jick, 91, American medical researcher.
- Geri M. Joseph, 100, American diplomat, ambassador to the Netherlands (1978–1981).
- Gordon Low, 83, Scottish footballer (Huddersfield Town, Bristol City, Stockport County).
- Carlinhos Maracanã, 66, Brazilian footballer (Paysandu, São Paulo, Taquaritinga), pancreatic cancer.
- Richard Martin, 80, French theater director, playwright, and actor (The Woman Cop, Cap Canaille, Too Beautiful for You).
- Osama Mazini, 57, Palestinian politician, airstrike.
- Bill McCabe, 88, Australian footballer (North Melbourne) and Olympic water polo player (1956).
- Chittaranjan Nepali, 92, Nepalese writer and historian (General Bhimsen Thapa Ra Tatkalin Nepal).
- Victor Perera, 75, Sri Lankan police officer and politician, inspector general of police (2006–2008) and governor of the Northern Province (2008).
- Dimitri Salachas, 84, Greek Byzantine Catholic hierarch, apostolic exarch of Greece (2008–2016).
- Yudhistir Samantray, 70, Indian politician, Odisha MLA (1995–2000).
- Eric Tweedale, 102, Australian rugby union player (Parramatta Two Blues, New South Wales, national team).
- Steven Weisberg, 68, American film editor (Great Expectations, Men in Black II, Harry Potter and the Prisoner of Azkaban), complications from Alzheimer's disease.

=== 17 ===
- Dirk Alvermann, 57, German historian and archivist.
- Syamsul Arifin, 71, Indonesian politician, governor of North Sumatra (2008–2011).
- George Baird, 84, Canadian architect (Cloud Gardens, Niagara Parks Butterfly Conservatory).
- Trevor Beeson, 97, English Anglican clergyman, dean of Winchester (1987–1996).
- Carol Berman, 100, American politician, member of the New York Senate (1979–1984).
- Edward Bleier, 94, American television executive.
- Carla Bley, 87, American jazz composer (Escalator over the Hill) and musician (Jazz Composer's Orchestra), brain cancer.
- Robert Camilleri Azzopardi, 72, Maltese Roman Catholic prelate, bishop of Comayagua (since 2004), heart attack.
- Giovanni Chiaramonte, 75, Italian photographer.
- Joan Cribb, 93, Australian botanist.
- Junji Higashi, 77, Japanese politician, MP (1990–1996, 1998–2012), pneumonia.
- Kundara Johny, 71, Indian actor (Varnapakittu, Hallo, Meppadiyan), heart attack.
- Geraldine A. Kenney-Wallace, 80, British-Canadian academic.
- Brian Langton, 75, Australian politician, New South Wales MP (1983–1999).
- Ayman Nofal, 57–58, Palestinian militant, Hamas commander, airstrike. (death announced on this date)
- Kalle Oranen, 77, Dutch footballer (Sportclub Enschede, Twente, SC Heracles).
- Orazio Rancati, 83, Italian football player (Parma, 1960 Olympic team) and manager (Sondrio).
- Tom Rychlec, 89, American football player (Buffalo Bills, Detroit Lions, Denver Broncos).
- Franz Karl Stanzel, 100, Austrian literary theorist.
- Aurèle Vandendriessche, 91, Belgian Olympic marathon runner (1956, 1960, 1964).
- Sir Tim Wallis, 85, New Zealand Hall of Fame aviation entrepreneur, founder of the Alpine Fighter Collection and the Warbirds over Wanaka.
- Vasily Zakharov, 89, Russian economist, minister of culture (1986–1989).

=== 18 ===
- William A. Berning, 91, American politician.
- Shafi Bikrampuri, 80, Bangladeshi film director (Denmohor) and producer.
- Roger Brown, 73, American basketball player (Detroit Pistons, Denver Nuggets, Carolina Cougars)
- Alexander Buzgalin, 69, Russian Marxist economist.
- Marinette Cueco, 89, French plastic artist.
- Osvaldo Desideri, 84, Italian art director (The Last Emperor, Once Upon a Time in America, Salò, or the 120 Days of Sodom), Oscar winner (1988).
- Beverley Dunlop, 88, New Zealand author.
- Tony Husband, 73, British cartoonist (Private Eye, Round the Bend, Hangar 17), heart attack.
- Alberto Jerez Horta, 96, Chilean lawyer, visual artist and politician, senator (1969–1973) and deputy (1961–1969).
- Jaymee Joaquin, 44, Filipina actress, model and host, cancer.
- Henry Kyemba, 84, Ugandan politician, minister of health (1974–1977), complications from diabetes.
- Juanita McNeely, 87, American artist.
- Muanda Nsemi, 77, Congolese politician and religious leader (Bundu dia Kongo).
- Josef Nüsser, 92, Czech Olympic skier (1956).
- André Palluel-Guillard, 82, French academic and historian.
- Dave Puddington, 95, American football coach (Washington University Bears).
- Paul Reynolds, 50, English cricket umpire (Cricket Ireland).
- Matías David Rodríguez, 41, Argentine politician, deputy (2015–2019) and senator (since 2019), suicide.
- Mzwakhe Sibisi, 53, South African politician, member of the national assembly (since 2019).
- Dwight Twilley, 72, American singer-songwriter ("I'm on Fire"), stroke.
- David P. Webster, 95, Scottish author, historian, and sports promoter (World Highland Games Championships), complications from dementia.

=== 19 ===
- The 45 King, 62, American record producer and DJ.
- Bangaru Adigalar, 82, Indian spiritual leader, founder of ACMEC, heart attack.
- Moe Amery, 69, Canadian politician, Alberta MLA (1993–2015).
- Judy Balaban, 91, American actress and author.
- Alan J. W. Bell, 85, British television producer and director (Last of the Summer Wine).
- Lasse Berghagen, 78, Swedish singer ("Teddybjörnen Fredriksson"), songwriter, and television presenter (Allsång på Skansen), complications from heart surgery.
- Robert B. Johnston, 86, American lieutenant general.
- Ilona Kerekes, 96, Hungarian table tennis player. (death announced on this date)
- Langfuhr, 31, Canadian Hall of Fame Thoroughbred racehorse. (death announced on this date)
- Teresa Magalhães, 79, Portuguese painter, pneumonia.
- Heinrich Messner, 84, Austrian alpine skier, Olympic bronze medalist (1968, 1972).
- Summa Navaratnam, 98, Sri Lankan track and field athlete, and rugby union player (Ceylonese Rugby & Football Club).
- Gerry Penner, 89, Canadian ice hockey player (Trail Smoke Eaters, New Westminster Royals, Seattle Americans).
- Fritz Peterson, 82, American baseball player (New York Yankees, Cleveland Indians, Texas Rangers), complications from Alzheimer's disease.
- Anfisa Reztsova, 58, Russian biathlete and cross-country skier, Olympic champion (1988, 1992, 1994).
- Carlos Romero Deschamps, 79, Mexican politician, MP (1979–1982, 1991–2003, 2012–2015).
- Atsushi Sakurai, 57, Japanese musician (Buck-Tick) and singer-songwriter, brain haemorrhage.
- Helmut Seeger, 91, German Olympic sport shooter (1972).
- Shodi Shabdolov, 80, Tajik politician, MP (1989–2015).
- Ilse Steinegger, 98, Austrian Olympic jumper (1948).
- David Turner, 77, British computer scientist.
- Anthony Vidler, 82, English architectural historian.
- Ed Winceniak, 94, American baseball player (Chicago Cubs).
- S. M. Zafar, 92, Pakistani human rights activist, lawyer and politician, senator (2006–2012) and minister of justice (1965–1969).
- Palestinians killed in a Gaza war airstrike:
  - Jamila Abdallah Taha al-Shanti, 68, politician, PLC (since 2006)
  - Rafat Abu Hilal, militant, head of military for the Popular Resistance Committees
  - Jihad Muheisen, militant, head of the Palestinian National Security Forces in the Gaza Strip

=== 20 ===
- Akoto Ampaw, 72–73, Ghanaian lawyer and human rights activist.
- Wies Andersen, 87, Belgian actor, television presenter, and director.
- Jack Anderson, 88, American dance critic (The New York Times), sepsis.
- Eduardo Arranz-Bravo, 82, Spanish painter.
- Jack Brennan, 86, American political aide.
- Norbert Buske, 87, German theologian and politician, member of the Landtag of Mecklenburg-Vorpommern (1990–1994).
- Donald Angus Cameron of Lochiel, 77, Scottish clan chief and public servant, Lord Lieutenant of Inverness (2002–2021).
- Robert M. Carmack, 89, American academic anthropologist.
- Giambattista Cescutti, 84, Italian basketball player (Victoria Pesaro, Ignis Varese) and head coach (SP Federale Lugano), traffic collision.
- Gerry Cranham, 94, English sports photographer.
- Leslie Dayman, 85, Australian actor (Prisoner, Homicide, E Street).
- Haydn Gwynne, 66, English actress (Drop the Dead Donkey, The Windsors, Billy Elliot the Musical), cancer.
- Amber L. Hollibaugh, 77, American writer, filmmaker and activist, complications from diabetes.
- Wolfgang Kaiser, 98, German physicist.
- Vera Klement, 93, American artist and professor (University of Chicago), complications from cancer and COVID-19.
- Pete Ladd, 67, American baseball player (Houston Astros, Milwaukee Brewers, Seattle Mariners), cancer.
- Donald Mackay, 86, Scottish-born Canadian chemical engineer.
- Hiba Abu Nada, 32, Palestinian poet, novelist and nutritionist, airstrike.
- Pat Nicol, 88, Canadian politician.
- Richard M. Osgood Jr., 79, American physicist.
- John Thorn, 98, English schoolmaster, writer and educational consultant.
- Franklin T. Tilton, 84, American politician.

=== 21 ===
- Corby Adams, 83, Canadian ice hockey player (Barrie Flyers).
- Ida Applebroog, 93, American multimedia artist.
- Vincent Asaro, 86, American mobster (Bonanno crime family).
- Layla Balabakki, 87, Lebanese novelist (I Live) and journalist.
- Burak Bekdil, 57, Turkish columnist (Defense News, The Wall Street Journal, The Guardian).
- Lee Eliot Berk, 81, American academic, president of Berklee College of Music (1979–2004).
- Peter Betts, 64, British civil servant, brain tumor.
- Robert K. Bing, 93, American politician, mayor of Burlington (1961–1963).
- Bobi, 31 (claimed), Portuguese Rafeiro do Alentejo dog, alleged oldest dog ever.
- Reino Börjesson, 94, Swedish footballer (IFK Göteborg, Norrby IF, national team).
- Sir Bobby Charlton, 86, English Hall of Fame football player (Manchester United, national team) and manager (Preston North End), world champion (1966), fall.
- Carroll Coates, 94, British-American songwriter, composer and lyricist.
- Max Corden, 96, Australian economist.
- Natalie Zemon Davis, 94, American-Canadian historian.
- Joan Evans, 89, American actress (Roseanna McCoy, Skirts Ahoy!, Column South).
- Hans Friessen, 74, Mexican footballer (Atlas, Guadalajara, Tecos).
- Lidia Gall, 89, Russian mass spectrometrist.
- Rob Gardner, 78, American baseball player (New York Mets, New York Yankees, Oakland Athletics).
- Bill Gates, 79, English footballer (Middlesbrough).
- Joseph Bernard Gildenhorn, 94, American diplomat, ambassador to Switzerland and Liechtenstein (1989–1993).
- Perry Gomez, 76, Bahamian politician, minister of health (2012–2017) and MP (since 2012).
- N. John Habraken, 94, Dutch architect, educator and theorist.
- Bill Hayden, 90, Australian politician, governor-general (1989–1996), minister for foreign affairs (1983–1988), and leader of the opposition (1977–1983).
- Alexander Ilečko, 86, Slovak sculptor.
- Stephen Kandel, 96, American television writer (Iron Horse, MacGyver, Mannix).
- Kim Yeong-do, 99, South Korean mountaineer and politician, MP (1973–1979).
- Lalith Kotelawala, 84, Sri Lankan banker, founder of Seylan Bank and chairman of Ceylinco Consolidated (1968–2008).
- Shahjahan Mia, 83, Bangladeshi politician, state minister of religious affairs (2009–2014), MP (2009–2014, since 2019).
- Cindy Montañez, 49, American politician, member of the California State Assembly (2012–2016) and mayor of San Fernando (2001–2002).
- A. F. M. Fakhrul Islam Munshi, 75, Bangladeshi politician, MP (1986–1990).
- Amusaa Mwanamwambwa, 83, Zambian politician, minister of tourism (1996–1998), member (1991–1998) and speaker (1998–2011) of the National Assembly.
- Zulkefly Mohamad Omar, 59, Malaysian politician, speaker of the Negeri Sembilan State Legislative Assembly (2018–2023).
- Joseph Ostermann, 85, French politician, senator (1991–2004), mayor of Wasselonne (1977–2014).
- Adrian Puzanovsky, 81, Russian politician, MP (1993–2003).
- Betsy Rawls, 95, American Hall of Fame golfer (LPGA).
- Sergio Staino, 83, Italian cartoonist (Bobo), director (Cavalli si nasce) and founder of Tango.
- Dusty Street, 77, American disc jockey.
- Marzia Ubaldi, 85, Italian actress (The Predators, Nazi Love Camp 27, Suburra: Blood on Rome).
- Alejandra Villafañe, 34, Colombian actress (Nurses, La nieta elegida), model and beauty queen, cancer.
- Samantha Woll, 40, American synagogue leader, president of Isaac Agree Downtown Synagogue (since 2022), stabbed.

=== 22 ===
- Amanda Aizpuriete, 67, Latvian poet and translator.
- Jeffrey A. Bader, 78, American diplomat, ambassador to Namibia (1999–2001).
- Mario Benítez, 77, Uruguayan Olympic boxer (1968).
- Kent Bloomer, 88, American sculptor.
- Mounira Chapoutot, 81, Tunisian academic and historian.
- Dave Courtney, 64, English gangster, writer, and actor (Triads, Yardies and Onion Bhajees, The Dead Sleep Easy, Killer Bitch), suicide by gunshot.
- Janina David, 93, Polish-British Holocaust survivor, writer and translator.
- Vic Fischer, 99, German-born American politician, member of the Alaska Senate (1981–1987).
- Carole E. Handler, 87, American lawyer.
- Don Laughlin, 92, American gambling entrepreneur.
- Raul Machado, 86, Portuguese footballer (Leixões, Benfica, national team).
- Enrique Maluenda, 88, Chilean television host.
- Igor Puzanov, 76, Russian general and politician, MP (2007–2011).
- Timo Roos, 87, Finnish teacher and politician, MP (1983–1995).
- Antoine Scopelliti, 84, Italian Roman Catholic prelate, coadjutor bishop of Ambatondrazaka (1991–1993) and bishop of Ambatondrazaka (1993–2015).
- David Stafford, 74, English writer and broadcaster, lung cancer.
- Anita Summers, 98, American educator.
- Gregg Sutton, 74, American musician (Lone Justice) and songwriter ("Stop!", "Breathe").
- Yang Le, 83, Chinese mathematician, member of the Chinese Academy of Sciences.
- Charles E. Young, 91, American academic administrator, president of the University of Florida (1999–2003) and chancellor of UCLA (1968–1997).

=== 23 ===
- Chronis Aidonidis, 95, Greek folk singer.
- Ibrahim al-Astal, 62, Palestinian educational theorist and researcher, airstrike.
- Robert Ayres, 91, American physicist and economist (industrial metabolism).
- Yves Beaumier, 80, Canadian educator and politician, Quebec MNA (1981–1985, 1994–2003).
- Bishan Singh Bedi, 77, Indian cricketer (Northern Punjab, Delhi, national team).
- Angelo Bruschini, 62, English guitarist (The Blue Aeroplanes, Massive Attack), lung cancer.
- Tasha Butts, 41, American basketball player (Minnesota Lynx) and coach (Georgetown Hoyas), breast cancer.
- Allan Callow, 94, Australian footballer (St Kilda).
- Rodolfo Cuenca, 95, Filipino building industry executive, chairman of CDCP (1967–1983). (death announced on this date)
- Birendra Nath Datta, 88, Indian folklorist.
- Desert Crown, 4, British racehorse, Epsom Derby winner (2022), euthanised.
- Robert Eshun, 48, Ghanaian footballer (Asante Kotoko, Gaziantepspor, Sarawak FA), cardiac arrest.
- Luis González Vales, 93, Puerto Rican military officer and historian, adjutant general (1983–1985) and official historian (since 1997).
- Tuulikki Hämäläinen, 82, Finnish economist and politician, MP (1983–1999).
- Scarlat Iriza, 68, Romanian politician, deputy (2000–2004, 2012–2016), senator (2016–2020).
- Bill Kenwright, 78, English theatre producer (Blood Brothers), film producer (Broken) and football administrator, chairman of Everton (since 2004), liver cancer.
- István Láng, 90, Hungarian composer, academic teacher (Franz Liszt Academy of Music) and cultural manager (International Society for Contemporary Music).
- Enrique Macaraeg, 67, Filipino Roman Catholic prelate, bishop of Tarlac (since 2016), cardiac arrest.
- Tryggve Mettinger, 83, Swedish biblical scholar.
- Bernard Morel, 98, French fencer, Olympic bronze medallist (1952).
- J. Frederick Motz, 80, American jurist, U.S. attorney for the district of Maryland (1981–1985), judge (since 1985) and chief judge (1994–2001) of the U.S. District Court for the District of Maryland.
- Mirosław Obłoński, 85, Polish writer, poet and singer (Piwnica pod Baranami).
- Bob Perry, 90, American tennis player.
- Harry Porterfield, 95, American newscaster (WBBM-TV, WLS-TV).
- Betty Price, 92, American music teacher, art director and ambassador.
- Aira Samulin, 96, Finnish dance teacher and businesswoman.
- Mervin Shiner, 102, American country singer ("Why Don't You Haul Off and Love Me"), songwriter and guitarist.
- David Steiner, 94, American real estate developer.
- Tom Walker, 74, American baseball player (Montreal Expos, Detroit Tigers, St. Louis Cardinals), pancreatic cancer.

=== 24 ===
- Lily Afshar, 63, Iranian classical guitarist, cancer.
- Hans Albert, 102, German philosopher (Münchhausen trilemma).
- Marcel Berthomé, 101, French politician, mayor of Saint-Seurin-sur-l'Isle (1971–2020).
- Brian Broadby, 80, Australian politician, lord mayor of Hobart (1984–1986).
- Imam Uddin Ahmed Chowdhury, 96, Bangladeshi politician, minister of commerce (1990–1991).
- Christiane Collange, 92, French journalist (Le Jardin des Modes) and author.
- Ina Cronjé, 79, South African politician, member of the KwaZulu-Natal Legislature (1994–2014).
- Léon Darnis, 95, French politician, deputy (1974–1978).
- Arnold Diaz, 74, American journalist (WPIX, WCBS-TV), cancer.
- Murray Elder, Baron Elder, 73, British politician, member of the House of Lords (since 1999), heart and kidney failure.
- Carlos Guerini, 74, Argentine footballer (General Paz Juniors, CD Málaga, Real Madrid).
- Jared Hassin, 33, American football player (Army Black Knights).
- Niels Holst-Sørensen, 100, Danish Olympic athlete (1948) and air force officer.
- Heinz Günther Hüsch, 94, German lawyer and politician, MP (1976–1990).
- Miyuki Ichijo, 76, Japanese voice actress (Case Closed, Project ARMS, Stitch!), multiple organ failure.
- Ricardo Iorio, 61, Argentine heavy metal singer and bass guitarist (Almafuerte, Hermética, V8).
- Ibrahima Kaba Bah, 92, Guinean politician and teacher.
- Ron Kee, 84, Australian footballer (St Kilda).
- Ajay Kumar Jena, 80, Indian politician, Odisha MLA (1977–1980, 1990–1995).
- Mike Lashuk, 84, Canadian football player (Edmonton Eskimos).
- Anderl Molterer, 92, Austrian alpine skier, Olympic silver medallist (1956).
- Elwood Plummer, 79, American basketball player and coach.
- Bob Pomphrey, 79, English cricketer (Hertfordshire).
- Wanda Półtawska, 101, Polish physician, pro-life activist, and Holocaust survivor.
- Steve Riley, 67, American drummer (Keel, W.A.S.P., L.A. Guns), pneumonia.
- Richard Roundtree, 81, American actor (Shaft, Se7en, Speed Racer), pancreatic cancer.
- Robin Turner, 81, British Anglican priest, Chaplain-in-Chief of the Royal Air Force (1995–1998).
- P. Veldurai, 73, Indian politician, Tamil Nadu MLA (1996–2001, 2006–2011).

=== 25 ===
- Ajith Abeyratne, 75, Sri Lankan rugby union player (Ceylonese, national team), coach (national rugby sevens team), and commentator.
- Bertie Bowman, 92, American congressional staffer, complications from heart surgery.
- Helena Carr, 77, Malaysian-born Australian businesswoman, brain aneurysm.
- Max Davidson, 89, Australian footballer (Collingwood).
- Steve Erwin, 63, American comic book artist (Checkmate, Gunfire), heart attack.
- Saleh Al-Gholab, 79, Jordanian politician, minister of culture (2000).
- Giorgos Grammatikakis, 84, Greek physicist, rector of the University of Crete (1990–1996) and MEP (2014–2019), respiratory failure.
- Elizabeth Gray, 86, Canadian radio broadcaster (CBC Radio), lung cancer.
- Syed Abul Hossain, 72, Bangladeshi politician, minister of communications (2009–2011) and ICT (2011–2012), state minister of local government, rural development and co-operatives (1996–1997), brain haemorrhage.
- Robert Irwin, 95, American installation artist (Getty Center), heart failure.
- Lilie James, 21, Australian student and water polo coach, beaten.
- Abdel Kharrazi, 47, Moroccan footballer (Sète 34), complications from amyotrophic lateral sclerosis.
- Zdeněk Mácal, 87, Czech conductor (Milwaukee Symphony Orchestra, New Jersey Symphony Orchestra, Czech Philharmonic).
- Shena Malsiana, 32, Indonesian singer (X Factor Indonesia), complications from lupus.
- Lyn McLain, 95, American music teacher and orchestra leader.
- David V. Mitchell, 79, American newspaper editor (Point Reyes Light), complications from Parkinson's disease.
- Hans Mosesson, 79, Swedish actor (Andra Avenyn) and musician (Nationalteatern), chronic obstructive pulmonary disease.
- Ružica Nikolić, 46–47, Serbian politician, MP (2017–2020).
- Pierre Nzila, 75, Congolese politician, MP (2002–2012), traffic collision.
- Ed Sandford, 95, Canadian ice hockey player (Boston Bruins, Chicago Blackhawks, Detroit Red Wings).
- Ian Shugart, 66, Canadian politician, senator (since 2022), clerk of the Privy Council (2019–2021).
- Alan Teasdale, 79, Australian footballer (Geelong).
- Dobroslav Trnka, 59, Slovak lawyer, cancer.
- Yūji Tsushima, 93, Japanese politician, minister of health (1990, 2000) and MP (1976–2009).
- Byron Wien, 90, American business investor.

=== 26 ===
- Hélène Alarie, 82, Canadian agronomist and politician, MP (1997–2000).
- Pekka Alonen, 94, Finnish Olympic alpine skier (1952).
- Lionel Balagalle, 75, Sri Lankan military officer, commander of the army (2000–2003) and chief of staff (1999–2000).
- Richard R. Bond, 95, American politician, member of the Colorado House of Representatives (1985–1991).
- Ray Brown, 74, American football player (Atlanta Falcons, New Orleans Saints).
- Jorge Búcaro, 77, Salvadoran football player (Águila, C.D. Platense) and manager (C.D. Salvadoreño).
- John Burnheim, 96, Australian philosopher.
- Guy Camberabero, 87, French rugby union player (La Voulte-Sportif, US Tyrosse, national team).
- Prabhatsinh Pratapsinh Chauhan, 82, Indian politician, MP (2009–2019).
- Malay Roy Choudhury, 83, Indian poet, founder of Hungryalist movement.
- Jérôme Christ, 85, French Olympic basketball player (1960).
- Babanrao Dhakne, 85, Indian politician, MP (1989–1991), heart attack.
- Baruch Mordechai Ezrachi, 94, Israeli Haredi rabbi.
- Goa Gil, 72, American musician, DJ, and remixer.
- Bobby Guindon, 80, American baseball player (Boston Red Sox).
- Phillip Isenberg, 84, American politician, mayor of Sacramento (1975–1982) and member of the California State Assembly (1982–1996).
- Ralph Kenna, 59, Irish mathematician.
- Youcef Khatib, 90, Algerian military officer and doctor.
- Marion Lerner-Levine, 91, British-born American painter.
- Richard Moll, 80, American actor (Night Court, House, Batman: The Animated Series).
- Harvey Munford, 83, American politician, member of the Nevada Assembly (2004–2016).
- Judy Nugent, 83, American actress (The Ruggles, Magnificent Obsession, There's Always Tomorrow), cancer.
- Peter Olausson, 51, Swedish author and webmaster.
- Ove Rullestad, 83, Norwegian politician, mayor of Farsund Municipality (1991–2001).
- Ed Sandford, 95, Canadian ice hockey player (Boston Bruins, Chicago Black Hawks, Detroit Red Wings).
- Nazzareno Simonato, 87, Italian Olympic rower (1960).
- Bingo Smith, 77, American basketball player (Tulsa Golden Hurricane, Cleveland Cavaliers).
- Rigo Star, 68, Congolese soukous guitarist and composer.
- Margarida Tengarrinha, 95, Portuguese political activist, MP (1979–1983).
- Sir Jon Trimmer, 84, New Zealand ballet dancer, cancer.

=== 27 ===
- Badrul Alam, 75, Bangladeshi air force officer.
- Wenche Blomberg, 80, Norwegian author.
- Denis Carufel, 69, Canadian ice hockey player (Maine Nordiques, Sorel Éperviers).
- Axali Doëseb, 69, Namibian composer ("Namibia, Land of the Brave"), complications from diabetes.
- Alexander Vasiliyevich Golovin, 73, Russian diplomat, ambassador to Austria (2000–2004).
- Curtis LeRoy Hansen, 90, American jurist, judge of the U.S. District Court for the District of New Mexico (since 1992).
- Anne Heywood, 91, British actress (The Fox, Ninety Degrees in the Shade, The Nun and the Devil), cancer.
- Gershon Hundert, 78, Canadian historian.
- Hiroshi Inuzuka, 94, Japanese actor (Daigoro vs. Goliath, Eijanaika, Chameleon) and bass guitarist.
- Li Keqiang, 68, Chinese politician, premier (2013–2023) and first vice premier (2008–2013), heart attack.
- Viktor Mamatov, 86, Russian biathlete, Olympic champion (1968, 1972).
- Ángel Martín Taboas, 105, Puerto Rican jurist and politician, secretary of treasury (1970–1971) and justice of the Supreme Court (1971–1982).
- William F. May, 96, American ethicist.
- Swarup Nayak, 76, Indian music director, composer, and actor.
- Henry Ohayon, 89, Moroccan-born Israeli Olympic cyclist (1960).
- Augustus Oldford, 98, Canadian politician.
- Jean Pellissier, 51, Italian ski mountaineer, mountain runner, and sky runner.
- Petros Themelis, 87, Greek archaeologist.
- Jan Veenstra, 81, Dutch footballer (Go Ahead Eagles, Vitesse).
- Ewald Walch, 83, Austrian luger, Olympic silver medallist (1968).
- John Wilkie, 76, Scottish footballer (Arbroath, Halifax Town, Wigan Athletic).
- Wu Zunyou, 60, Chinese epidemiologist, chief epidemiologist at the Chinese Center for Disease Control and Prevention (since 2017), pancreatic cancer.

=== 28 ===
- Juan Álvarez, 80, Chilean footballer (San Luis, Santiago Wanderers, Deportes La Serena).
- Erkki Antila, 69, Finnish Olympic biathlete (1980).
- Jim Bennett, 76, British museum curator and science historian, cancer.
- Carl Braaten, 94, American Lutheran theologian and minister.
- Franklin Cisneros, 39, Salvadoran Olympic judoka (2008).
- Daniel Eckenspieller, 91, French politician, senator (1995–2004).
- Vivian Folkenflik, 83, American educator and translator, struck by vehicle.
- Domenico Genovese, 62, English football player (Boston United, Peterborough United) and manager (Spalding United).
- Armita Geravand, 17, Iranian student, assault.
- Károly Hauszler, 71, Hungarian water polo player, Olympic bronze medallist (1980).
- Saleemul Huq, 71, British-Bangladeshi climatologist, director of ICCCAD (since 2009), heart attack.
- Adam Johnson, 29, American ice hockey player (Pittsburgh Penguins, Nottingham Panthers), neck cut during game.
- Roland Lajoie, 87, American military major general.
- Svetlana Laukhova, 50, Russian Olympic hurdler (2000).
- Alaba Lawson, 72, Nigerian business magnate and academician.
- Patricia Mahan, 71, American politician, mayor of Santa Clara (2002–2014).
- Matthew Perry, 54, American-Canadian actor (Friends, The Whole Nine Yards, Fallout: New Vegas), acute ketamine intoxication.
- Bill Rice, 84, American country music singer and songwriter.
- Shahida Qazi, 79, Pakistani journalist (Dawn News, PTV).
- Audrey Schuh, 92, American operatic soprano.
- Arthur Britton Smith, 103, Canadian philanthropist, businessman, and writer.
- Mary Lou Walter, 84, American politician, member of the Rhode Island House of Representatives (1984–1998).

=== 29 ===
- Charlie Aitken, 81, Scottish footballer (Aston Villa, New York Cosmos).
- Terry Barrett, 77–78, American art critic.
- Tomás Barris, 93, Spanish Olympic middle-distance runner (1960).
- Robert Brustein, 96, American theater critic (New Republic), playwright, and political commentator (HuffPost).
- Jimmy Duggan, 93, Irish hurler (Liam Mellows, Galway).
- René Exbrayat, 75, French football player (Arles, Aix-en-Provence) and manager (Avignon).
- Martha Ezzard, 84, American politician.
- Dick Fontaine, 83–84, English documentary filmmaker.
- Siri Frost Sterri, 79, Norwegian politician, MP (1985–2001).
- Heath, 55, Japanese bass guitarist (X Japan), colon cancer.
- Trevor Hill, 98, British producer (Children's Hour, Round Britain Quiz, Sooty), director and writer.
- Ado Ibrahim, 94, Nigerian traditional ruler, Ohinoyi of Ebiraland (since 1997).
- Reed McNeil Izatt, 97, American chemist.
- Willard Johnson, 87, American political scientist and Africanist.
- Jerzy Mruk, 85, Polish ice hockey player (Cracovia) and coach (Unia Oświęcim, national team).
- Joey Paras, 45, Filipino actor (Bekikang: Ang Nanay Kong Beki, FlordeLiza, Sunday PinaSaya) and comedian.
- Aldo Pifferi, 85, Italian racing cyclist.
- Thierry Rautureau, 64, French-born American celebrity chef.
- Ronnie Rees, 79, Welsh footballer (Coventry City, Swansea City, Nottingham Forest).
- Ramón Rodríguez Arribas, 89, Spanish judge, member (2004–2013) and vice president (2012–2013) of the Constitutional Court, justice of the Supreme Court (1978–1996).
- Tony Rohr, 84, Irish actor (The Long Good Friday, Harry's Game, The Lakes), prostate cancer.
- Kenneth C. Smith, 91, Canadian electrical engineer and academic.
- Zinnatunnessa Talukdar, 76, Bangladeshi politician, state minister of primary and mass education (1998–2001) and MP (1996–2001, 2009–2014), heart and lung disease.
- Jeyan Mahfi Tözüm, 95, Turkish actress (Belalı Baldız, Yaprak Dökümü).
- Herbert Urlacher, 91, American politician, member of the North Dakota Senate (1993–2008).

=== 30 ===
- Walter Adams, 78, German Olympic runner (1968, 1972).
- Paul Angenvoorth, 78, German Olympic long-distance runner (1972).
- Sarwat Karim Ansari, 67, Indian politician, Uttarakhand MLA (2012–2017, since 2022), heart disease.
- Luwalhati Antonino, 80, Filipino politician, representative (1992–2001), chairperson of the MinDA (2010–2016).
- Agha Hasan Askari, 78, Pakistani film director (Toofan, Doorian, Mela), lung cancer.
- Sam Ball, 79, American football player (Baltimore Colts).
- Sarat Barkotoky, 88, Indian politician, Assam MLA (1991–2016).
- Peter S. Fischer, 88, American television writer (Murder, She Wrote, Columbo, Ellery Queen).
- Frank Howard, 87, American baseball player (Washington Senators/Texas Rangers, Detroit Tigers, Los Angeles Dodgers), complications from a stroke.
- Edward Kresge, 88, American scientist.
- Laiq Zada Laiq, 64, Pakistani poet, heart attack.
- Gien van Maanen, 87, Dutch handball (national team) and football player (national team).
- Vladimir Markelov, 66, Russian gymnast, Olympic champion (1980).
- Barry McKinnon, 79, Canadian poet, multiple organ failure.
- Hans Meiser, 77, German radio and television presenter and journalist.
- Renjusha Menon, 35, Indian actress (Thalappavu, Bombay March 12, Lisammayude Veedu), suicide by hanging.
- Tim Parenton, 61, American college baseball coach (Samford Bulldogs, North Florida Ospreys), throat cancer.
- István Pásztor, 67, Serbian politician, president of the Assembly of Vojvodina (since 2012).
- Lois Galgay Reckitt, 78, American activist and politician, member of the Maine House of Representatives (since 2016), colon cancer.
- James B. Scanlon, 92, American lieutenant colonel.
- Gary Seitz, 80, American mathematician.
- Mirth Solomon, 84, New Zealand Hall of Fame netball player (national team), world champion (1967).

=== 31 ===
- Lea Ackermann, 86, German Roman Catholic nun and anti-prostitution activist.
- Mohamed Ahmed Alin, 72, Somali military officer and politician, president of Galmudug (2009–2012), stroke.
- Bill Bealles, 60, American football player (Miami Dolphins).
- Jaak Broekx, 109, Belgian centenarian, nation's oldest living man (since 2021).
- Shepherd Gundu Chengeta, 57, Zimbabwean politician.
- Tyler Christopher, 50, American actor (General Hospital, Days of Our Lives, The Lying Game), cardiac arrest.
- Vivian Cobbe, 89, Irish hurler.
- Lawrence Cohn, 91, American lawyer, record company executive, and blues record collector.
- Felipe Diogo, 21, Brazilian footballer (São Bernardo), shot.
- José Luis Dolgetta, 53, Venezuelan football player (Estudiantes de Mérida, national team) and manager (Tucanes de Amazonas), heart attack.
- Ernesto Ferrero, 85, Italian writer and literary critic.
- Jorge Arturo García Rubí, 75, Mexican lawyer and politician, interim governor of Morelos (2000).
- John Hagedorn, 76, American professor.
- Linda Hirshman, 79, American author, academic, and lawyer, cancer.
- Ernst Hofer, 52, Austrian judoka.
- Séamus Leydon, 81, Irish Gaelic footballer (Galway, Dunmore MacHales, Nemo Rangers).
- Donald Longmore, 95, British heart surgeon.
- Ken Mattingly, 87, American astronaut (Apollo 16, STS-4, STS-51-C).
- Frank H. Mayfield, 84, American politician.
- George W. Owings III, 78, American politician, member of the Maryland House of Delegates (1988–2004).
- Maria Pergay, 93, French furniture designer.
- Oleg Protopopov, 91, Russian pair skater, Olympic champion (1964, 1968).
- Mike Reppond, 72, American football player (Chicago Bears).
- Fabien Roy, 95, Canadian politician, MP (1979–1980) and Quebec MNA (1970–1979).
- Heinz Schlaffer, 84, German Germanist and literary scholar.
- Mel Sembler, 93, American diplomat, ambassador to Italy (2001–2005) and Australia (1989–1993).
- Clifford W. Trow, 94, American politician, member of the Oregon Senate (1975–1995).
- Elmar Wepper, 79, German actor (Der Kommissar, Cherry Blossoms, Lammbock) and voice actor.
- David Wilshire, 80, British politician, MP (1987–2010).
- Hugh Wyllie, 89, Scottish Presbyterian minister, moderator of the General Assembly of the Church of Scotland (1992–1993).
- Koichi Yamamoto, 76, Japanese politician, minister of environment (2016–2017) and MP (1993–2021).
- Peter Yeo, 76, Australian footballer (Melbourne).
