= Kenneth Horsnell =

Australian cricketer (1933–2023)

Personal information
- Full name: Kenneth George Horsnell
- Born: 3 September 1933; Joslin, South Australia, Australia
- Died: 1 October 2023 (aged 90); Adelaide, South Australia, Australia
- Nickname: Charlie
- Batting: Left-handed
- Bowling: Left-arm fast-medium
- Role: Bowler

Domestic team information
- Years: Team
- 1953–54 to 1960–61: South Australia

Career statistics
Competition	FC
Matches	16
Runs scored	166
Batting average	7.21
100s/50s	0/0
Top score	29
Balls bowled	3016
Wickets	44
Bowling average	31.72
5 wickets in innings	2
10 wickets in match	1
Best bowling	6/80
Catches/stumpings	7/–
- Source: Cricket Archive, 9 October 2023

Kenneth George "Charlie" Horsnell (3 September 1933 – 1 October 2023) was an Australian cricketer. He played in sixteen first-class matches as a left-arm seam bowler for South Australia between 1953 and 1960.

His best performance was in his third match, against Victoria at Melbourne in January 1954, when he took six for 80 in Victoria's first innings and six for 102 in the second. He dropped out of the team in 1955–56, but returned to play two more first-class matches in November 1960.

Horsnell played grade cricket for East Torrens and Kensington, as well as Australian rules football for Norwood in the South Australian National Football League.

Kenneth Horsnell died on 1 October 2023, at the age of 90.

== See also ==
- List of South Australian representative cricketers
