= Lyn McLain =

American music teacher (1928–2023)

Lyn McLain (April 17, 1928 – October 25, 2023) was an American music teacher and orchestra leader.

== Early life and education ==
Lyn McLain was born in New York on April 17, 1928. He received his bachelor's and master's degrees in music theory and composition from Ithaca College in New York. McLain also completed additional graduate work at Catholic University of America, Cornell University, Trinity College, and the University of the District of Columbia. In 1956 he became a music teacher with the DC Public Schools.

== Career ==
In the fall of 1960, at the request of the DC Public Schools music department, he and his colleagues Marian Banner and Loran Stephenson, Sr., founded the DC Youth Orchestra Program. The program grew from an initial 60-member orchestra with three volunteer teachers to a program that provides instrumental music lessons from beginning to advanced classes. Between the years of 1970 and 2006, McLain took the orchestras on more than 13 concert tours in over 19 countries, has performed for several Presidents and earned numerous awards for outstanding performances in places such as St. Moritz, Switzerland; Aberdeen, Scotland; Beijing, China; Moscow, Russia; and Athens, Greece.

Lyn McLain retired from the Public Schools in 1993. Following his retirement, McLain served as music director for the organization until August 2004. After leaving the position of music director, he continued to conduct the Youth Orchestra, Junior Philharmonic, and Virtuosi groups until March 2006, when he retired for health reasons. In June 2006, McLain also retired from the organization's board of directors, where he had served as president for two years.

== Death ==
Lyn McLain died on October 25, 2023, at the age of 95.

== Honors ==
McLain received local, national, and international awards for music performances, music education and curriculum development from numerous government, social, and civic organizations as well as national and international media for providing opportunities for young musicians. McLain was profiled in the PBS program Searching for Heroes in 1996.
