= Scarlat Iriza =

Romanian politician (1955–2023)

Member of the Senate of Romania for Gorj County
- In office 20 December 2016 – 21 December 2020

Member of the Chamber of Deputies of Romania
- In office 19 December 2012 – 19 December 2016
- In office December 2000 – 16 December 2004

Personal details
- Born: 3 September 1955 Bustuchin, Romania
- Died: 23 October 2023 (aged 68) Bucharest, Romania
- Party: PSDR (until February 2001); PSD (February 2001–February 2015); UNPR (February 2015–February 2016); PMP (February 2016–July 2016); ALDE (from July 2016)
- Education: University of Craiova

Scarlat Iriza (3 September 1955 – 23 October 2023) was a Romanian politician. A member of multiple social democratic political parties, he served in the Chamber of Deputies from 2000 to 2004 and again from 2012 to 2016, as well as the Senate from 2016 to 2020.

Iriza died in Bucharest on 23 October 2023, at the age of 68.
