= Guy Briet =

French football manager (1936–2023)

Personal information
- Date of birth: 20 January 1936
- Place of birth: Savigny-lès-Beaune, France
- Date of death: 2 October 2023 (aged 87)

Managerial career
- Years: Team
- 1970–1976: Bataillon de Joinville
- 1976–1977: Troyes (assistant)
- 1977–1982: Saint-Étienne (assistant)
- 1983: Saint-Étienne
- 1983–1985: Tours
- 1986–1988: Gueugnon
- 1988–1989: Le Puy

Guy Briet (20 January 1936 – 2 October 2023) was a French football manager.

== Biography ==
Born in Savigny-lès-Beaune on 20 January 1936, Briet was a sports coach within the National Gendarmerie and several small football clubs. He then served as head coach of the Bataillon de Joinville football team, where he managed players such as Michel Platini, Olivier Rouyer, Omar Sahnoun, Jean-Michel Moutier, Éric Pécout, Maxime Bossis, and Gilles Rampillon.

Briet was then an assistant for Troyes for nine months before becoming an assistant, then head coach, for Saint-Étienne. Later in his career, he coached for Tours and Gueugnon before retiring with Le Puy.

Briet died on 2 October 2023, at the age of 87.
