= Teodor Stanca =

Romanian engineer and politician (1933–2023)

Member of the Chamber of Deputies of Romania for Timiș County
- In office 27 November 1996 – 30 November 2000

Personal details
- Born: 26 March 1933 Craiva, Romania
- Died: 14 October 2023 (aged 90)
- Party: PNȚCD
- Education: Politehnica University of Timișoara
- Occupation: Engineer

Teodor Stanca (26 March 1933 – 14 October 2023) was a Romanian engineer and politician. A member of the Christian Democratic National Peasants' Party, he served in the Chamber of Deputies from 1996 to 2000.

Stanca died on 14 October 2023, at the age of 90.
