= Paul Leuquet =

French painter, cartoonist, and poet (1932–2023)

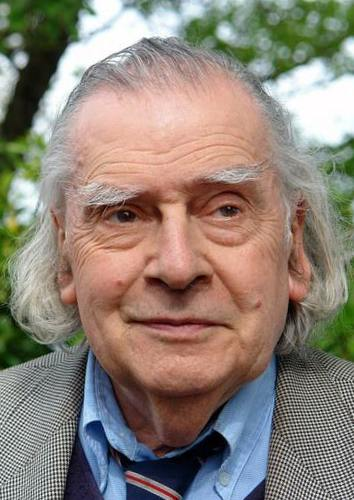
- Leuquet in 2006
- Born: 29 November 1932; Bordeaux, France
- Died: 10 October 2023 (aged 90); Bordeaux, France
- Education: École des beaux-arts de Bordeaux
- Occupations: Painter; Cartoonist; Poet

Paul Leuquet (29 November 1932 – 10 October 2023) was a French painter, cartoonist, and poet.

== Biography ==
Born in Bordeaux on 29 November 1932, Leuquet was the son of an actor father and an artist mother. He studied at the École des beaux-arts de Bordeaux and held his first exhibition in 1957. In 1962, he published Joachim du Bellay, Divers Jeux rustiques with Éditions Vialetay. In 1964, he released the album Images de Bordeaux, which contained 14 original chisels. In 1969, he released Images de la Nature, prefaced by René Huyghe.

In 1971, Leuquet received the Grand Medal of the Académie Nationale Arts, Sciences, Lettres de Bordeaux. That same year, he released Paysages d'Aquitaine, with 14 chisels. In 1982, a retrospective exhibition bearing his name was held at the Grand Hôtel de Bordeaux & Spa. One of his engravings and watercolors was selected by the Musée des Beaux-Arts de Bordeaux in 1984. One of his works was exhibited alongside Pablo Picasso's at the Musée Picasso in Antibes.

In 1993, Leuquet released Le Voyage d'Ulysse, a catalogue on the initiative of Bernard Barthet and Jean Cazès, and financed by the Crédit Foncier de France. In 1995, he published Monsieur Dubois ou les mémoires de mon Ombre with Éditions Opales, a novel of more than a hundred fables. He published another book in 1998 with the Regional Council of Aquitaine, titled Des pas et des chemins. In 2000, he produced six steel frames for Château Durfort-Vivens. His final text was written in 2003, titled Avez-vous des nouvelles de Monsieur de la Pérouse ? and published by Éditions Opales.

Paul Leuquet died in Bordeaux on 10 October 2023, at the age of 90.

== Publications ==
- Joachim Du Bellay Divers jeux rustiques (1962)
- Les Besoins esthétiques de l’homme (1979)
- Monsieur Dubois ou les mémoires de mon ombre (1995)
- Des pas et des chemins (1998)
- Avez-vous des nouvelles de M. de la Pérouse ? (2004)
