= Ibrahim al-Astal =

Palestinian educator and professor (1961–2023)

- إبراهيم الأسطل
- Born: Ibrahim Hamed Hussein al-Astal; 20 January 1961; Egyptian-occupied Gaza Strip
- Died: 23 October 2023 (aged 62); Gaza Strip, Palestine
- Other name: IH Al-Astal
- Occupations: Educational theorist; Researcher

Ibrahim Hamed Hussein al-Astal (Arabic: إبراهيم حامد حسين الأسطل. 20 January 1961 – 23 October 2023) was a Palestinian educational theorist and researcher. He worked as a dean and professor at Islamic University of Gaza, Faculty of Education. He was the Editor-in-chief of IUG Journal of Educational and Psychological Studies.

== Biography ==
Ibrahim al-Astal was born on 20 January 1961. He was awarded a PhD in Curriculum and Mathematics Teaching Methods in 1996, after which he worked as a professor at Al Ain University and Ajman University in the United Arab Emirates, then at Islamic University of Gaza. He worked in several positions at the Faculty of Education at the Islamic University of Gaza, he was the head of Curriculum and Teaching Methods Department (September 2011–August 2013), then the vice Dean (September 2013–August 2015), then the dean of South Branch (August 2015–August 2017) and finally the dean since 1 September 2019.

Al-Astal worked as a coordinator for several programs and projects, including: "Improving the Quality of Technology Education Teacher Preparation Programs in the Universities and Colleges in Gaza Strip", funded by International Development Association and European Union in 2010 and "Teacher Education Improvement Program (TEIP)", funded by World Bank and Palestinian Ministry of Education and Higher Education, between 2011 and 2019. He was also a member of the steering committee of the project "Mathematics Education Pre-service Teacher Education Development Program", led by the Arab American University in partnership with UCL Institute of Education (2010–2012) and member of steering committee of the project "Developing the Teacher Education Preparation for Early Children Education and Elementary School in Palestine and Norway", led by University of South-Eastern Norway from January 2019.

In 2005, he published a book entitled Mihnat altaelim 'adwar almuealimin fe madrasat almustaqbal (‘The teaching profession, the roles of teachers in the school of the future’ Arabic: مهنة التعليم أدوار المعلمين في مدرسة المستقبل) in cooperation with Faryal Younis Al-Khalidi.

On 23 October 2023, he, his wife, his daughters, and a number of his relatives were killed during an airstrike attack fired by Israeli Air Force on his home, during the Gaza war. Al-Astal was 62.
