= María Alejandra Bruzual =

Venezuelan jockey (1980–2023)

Personal information
- Nationality: Venezuelan
- Born: c. 1980
- Died: 14 October 2023 Valencia, Venezuela

Sport
- Sport: Horse racing

María Alejandra Bruzual (c. 1980 – 14 October 2023) was a Venezuelan jockey.

== Career ==
María Alejandra was licensed in administration by profession. She obtained her first victory in April 2007 at the La Rinconada racetrack with the thoroughbred The Congo, date from which she remained active in the sport. At the Monterrico racetrack in Peru, she participated in the International Jockeys Championship, where she won one of the competitions. On 26 June 2022, she won her last victory at the Rinconada racetrack, on Queen Clementina, and in 2023 she won three times at the Valencia racetrack.

María Alejandra died on 14 October 2023, at the Valencia racetrack, when she fell from her Sun Cab during the fourth race of the day. She received first aid from the racetrack's medical service and was taken to a clinic in Valencia, but arrived at the medical center without vital signs.

== Personal life ==
Another jockey, Luis Francisco Martín, was Bruzual's sentimental partner.
