= Mary Lou Walter =

American politician

Member of the Rhode Island House of Representatives from the 51st district
- In office 1984–1998
- Succeeded by: Peter Lewiss

Personal details
- Born: May 9, 1939 Westerly, Rhode Island, U.S.
- Died: October 28, 2023 (aged 84)
- Party: Republican

Mary Lou Walter (May 9, 1939 – October 28, 2023) was an American politician. She served as a Republican member for the 51st district of the Rhode Island House of Representatives.

== Life and career ==
Walter was born in Westerly, Rhode Island. She attended Stonington High School.

Walter served in the Rhode Island House of Representatives from 1984 to 1998.

Walter died on October 28, 2023, at the age of 84.
