= Larisa Opanasyuk =

Ukrainian-born Russian politician (1962–2023)

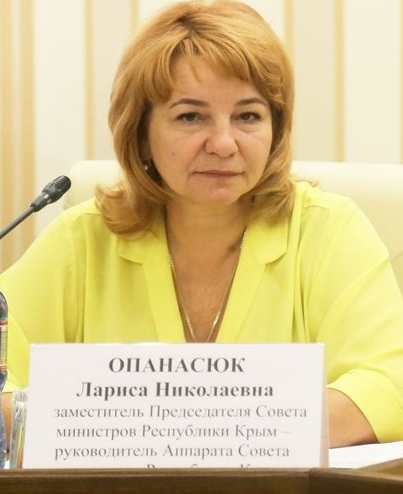
- Opanasyuk in 2018

Deputy Chairman of the Council of Ministers of Republic of Crimea
- In office 28 February 2014 – 6 November 2019
- Preceded by: position established
- Succeeded by: Irina Kiviko

Personal details
- Born: Larisa Nikolaevna Opanasyuk; 26 December 1962 Hvardiiske, Simferopol Raion, Crimean Oblast, Ukrainian SSR, USSR
- Died: 5 October 2023 (aged 60)
- Party: Party of Regions
- Education: Kharkiv Law Institute; National Academy for Public Administration
- Occupation: Lawyer

Larisa Nikolaevna Opanasyuk (Russian: Лариса Николаевна Опанасюк; Ukrainian: Лариса Миколаївна Опанасюк, romanized: Larysa Mykolaivna Opanasiuk; 26 December 1962 – 5 October 2023) was a Ukrainian-born Russian lawyer and politician. A member of the Party of Regions, she served as Deputy Chairman of the Council of Ministers of Republic of Crimea from 2014 to 2019.

== Biography ==
Opanasyuk was born on 26 December 1962 in Hvardiiske, which was then part of the Ukrainian SSR. In 1985 she graduated from the Yaroslav Mudryi National Law University with a degree in law. After graduating she started her career as an acting assistant prosecutor for civil cases in Simferopol.

From 2000 to 2006 she worked as the Head of the Main Legal Department of the Council of Ministers of Crimea. During this time, she also worked for a degree and in 2004 obtained from her alma mater in public administration. Then, from 2006 to 2008, she became the First Deputy Minister of the Council of Ministers and head of the Main Legal Department. In 2011 she was appointed acting chairman of the Republican Committee of Crimea for the Protection of Cultural Heritage, succeeding Sergey Tur who went to another place of work.

== Personal life ==
She has two twin daughters, who eventually formed a singing duet together under the name "Anna-Maria". A scandal erupted occurred during the Ukrainian selection for Eurovision Song Contest 2019, in which they competed for entry, when they were asked whether Crimea belonged to Ukraine by Serhiy Prytula, which he noted could cause an end to their mother's career to which they responded that it was between choosing their own careers or their parents. Eventually, they stated "Ukraine has lost Crimea", which led to them getting last place in the selection.

Opanasyuk died on 5 October 2023, at the age of 60.
