= Giancarlo Cantelmi =

Italian politician (1926–2023)

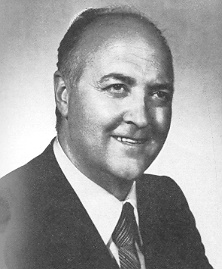
- Cantelmi in 1976

Member of the Chamber of Deputies of Italy
- In office 5 July 1976 – 11 July 1983
- Constituency: Abruzzo

Personal details
- Born: 17 May 1926 Celano, Italy
- Died: 14 October 2023 (aged 97)
- Party: PCI
- Occupation: Lawyer

Giancarlo Cantelmi (17 May 1926 – 14 October 2023) was an Italian lawyer and politician. A member of the Italian Communist Party, he served in the Chamber of Deputies from 1976 to 1983.

Cantelmi died on 14 October 2023, at the age of 97.
