= Mounira Chapoutot =

Tunisian academic and historian (1942–2023)

Director of Les Cahiers de Tunisie
- In office 1997–2011

Personal details
- Born: 27 April 1942
- Died: 22 October 2023 (aged 81)
- Occupation: Professor; Historian

Mounira Chapoutot (Arabic: منيرة شابوطو; 27 April 1942 – 22 October 2023) was a Tunisian academic and historian who specialized in the Middle Ages.

== Biography ==
Born on 27 April 1942, Chapoutot was a professor at Tunis University and directed the History Department at the Faculty of Human and Social Sciences of Tunis. She directed the journal Les Cahiers de Tunisie and directed history studies at the École normale supérieure de Tunis.

Chapoutot was a member of the Tunisian Academy of Sciences, Letters and Arts and presided over its social and human sciences section. She was also a member of the journal Al-Qantara and a member of the committee of the Prix Zoubeida Bchir. She was a member of the jury for the COMAR d'Or and oversaw thesis defenses for various master's and doctoral degrees. She was invited to teach at Pantheon-Sorbonne University, the University of Lyon, and the Institut français des études arabes.

Mounira Chapoutot died on 22 October 2023, at the age of 81.

== Distinctions ==
- Commander of the National Order of Merit of Tunisia (2007)
- Officer of the Ordre des Palmes académiques (2006)
- Ibn Khaldun Awards (2016)
- Prize of the Union of Arab Archaeologists (2020)

== Publications ==
- 1492 en Méditerranée (1992)
- Liens et relations au sein de l'élite mamlūke sous les premiers sultans Baḥrides (1993).
- Itinéraire du savoir en Tunisie : les temps forts de l'histoire tunisienne (1995)
- Sur les pas d'Ibn Khaldoun (2006)
- Destins croisés en Méditerranée : Jean-Léon l'Africain et Mustapha des Six-Fours (2007)
- موسوعة القيروان (2010)
