= Piotr Klemensiewicz =

French painter and sculptor (1956–2023)

- Born: 11 February 1956; Marseille, France
- Died: 5 October 2023 (aged 67)
- Education: École supérieure d'art et de design Marseille-Méditerranée
- Occupations: Painter; Sculptor

Piotr Klemensiewicz (11 February 1956 – 5 October 2023) was a French painter and sculptor.

== Biography ==
Born in Marseille on 11 February 1956, Klemensiewicz was the son of Polish parents who fled after World War II following their serving in the Polish Resistance. He attended the École supérieure d'art et de design Marseille-Méditerranée, where he graduated in 1979 and became a teacher in 1986. Although he served many years as a teacher, he still created many autobiography works and landscape sculptures. He also spent time in Germany, South Korea, and Canada to teach at the Université du Québec à Montréal.

In 2005, Actes Sud published a retrospective on Klemensiewicz's work, which was commented on by Bernard Millet. In 2007, the usée des Tapisseries et le Pavillon Vendôme 'Aix-en-Provence exhibited his monography, "Nuance", edited by Archibooks and with text by Brice Matthieussent. In September 2017, Archibooks published a monographic book following one of his exhibitions at the Jardins de Salagon. In July 2020, he exhibited at Silvacane Abbey, where many of the works he created throughout his life were on display. He said that his works were "an autobiographical dimension which goes beyond the question of painting and form. It's simply my moods, it's my life, it's other people, it's travel, it's lots of things. If we start to think about the need to do all this, it takes my hands off! I absolutely don't want to think that I'm painting for something specific".

Piotr Klemensiewicz died on 5 October 2023, at the age of 67.

== Collective expositions ==
- Philippe Charpentier, Piotr Klemensiewicz, Pierre et Gilles, Serge Plagnol... at Galerie Saluces in Avignon (1986)
- Marseille-Nice, led by Ben Vautier at the Musée d'Art de Toulon (1987)
- Réserves de mémoires, led by Bernard Millet and Frédéric Valabrègues at Frac Paca in Marseille (1991)
- La Peau du chat - Carlota Charmet et les collectionneurs at the Centre d'art de l'Yonne in Tanlay (2004)

== Bibliography ==
- Le porteur d'eau (1993)
- Peintures (1995)
- Encombrements (2005)
- Nuance (2007)
- NBT et autres peintures vertes (2017)
