= Léon Darnis =

French politician (1928–2023)

Member of the French National Assembly for Vendée's 4th constituency
- In office 29 June 1974 – 2 April 1978
- Preceded by: Vincent Ansquer
- Succeeded by: Vincent Ansquer

Mayor of Le Poiré-sur-Vie
- In office 20 March 1977 – 18 March 2001
- Preceded by: Jean Ruchaud
- Succeeded by: Didier Mandelli

Personal details
- Born: Léon Joseph Darnis; 20 July 1928 Mont-Dore, France
- Died: 24 October 2023 (aged 95)
- Party: UDR; RPR
- Education: École nationale vétérinaire de Maisons-Alfort
- Occupation: Veterinarian

Léon Joseph Darnis (20 July 1928 – 24 October 2023) was a French veterinarian and politician of the Union of Democrats for the Republic (UDR) and the Rally for the Republic (RPR).

== Biography ==
Born in Mont-Dore on 20 July 1928, Darnis graduated from the École nationale vétérinaire de Maisons-Alfort in 1952. He then moved to Le Poiré-sur-Vie and became a member of the municipal council in 1965, then mayor in 1977.

Darnis was the substitute for Vincent Ansquer in the National Assembly and replaced him on 29 June 1974, representing Vendée's 4th constituency. He served until 2 April 1978.

Léon Darnis died on 24 October 2023, at the age of 95.

== Distinctions ==
- Knight of the Legion of Honour (2002)
