= Klaus Höpcke =

German politician (1933–2023)

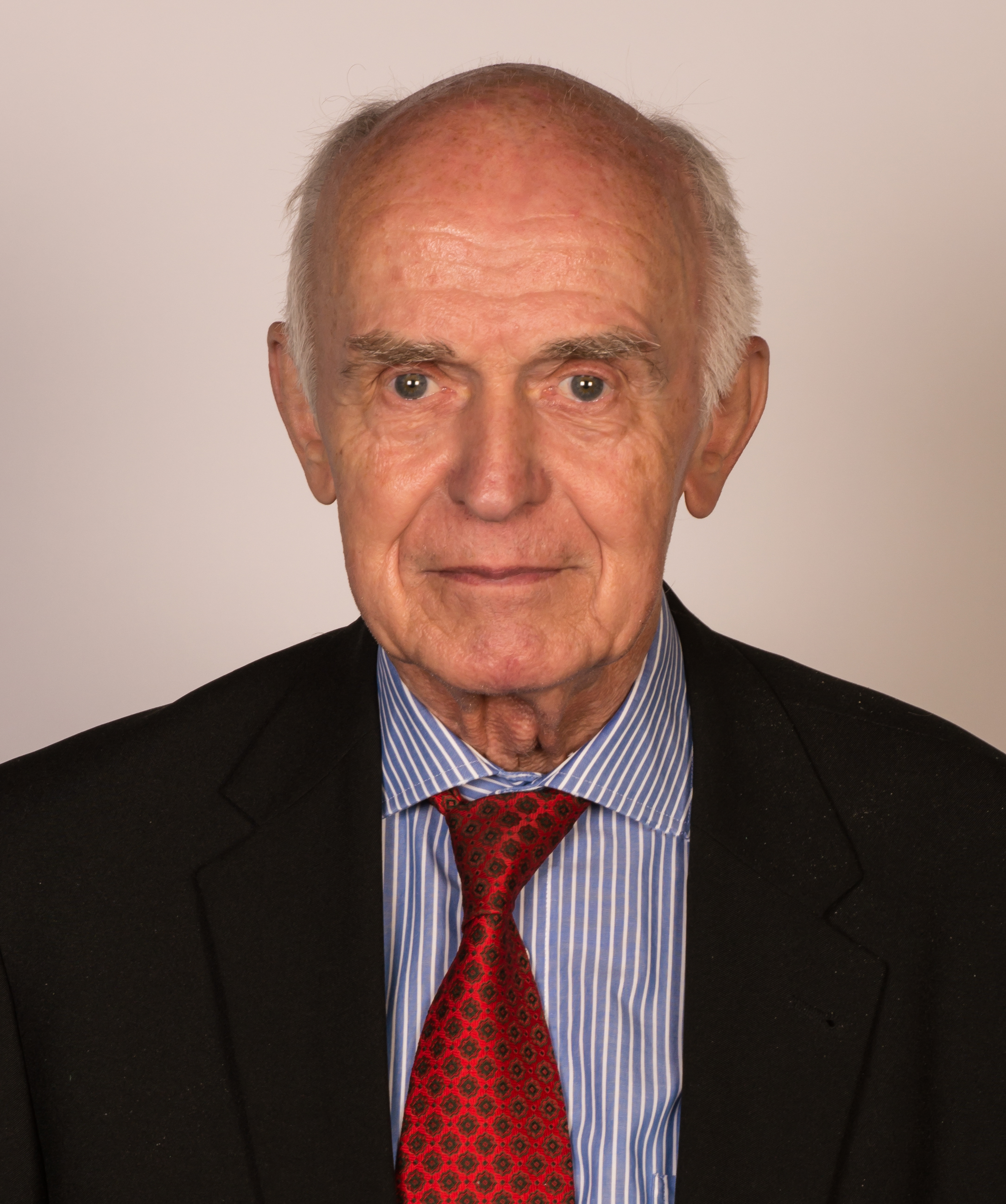
- Höpcke in 2014

Member of the Landtag of Thuringia
- In office 25 October 1990 – 1 October 1999

Personal details
- Born: 27 November 1933 Cuxhaven, Germany
- Died: 14 October 2023 (aged 89) Berlin, Germany
- Party: PDS
- Education: Leipzig University

Klaus Höpcke (27 November 1933 – 14 October 2023) was a German politician. A member of the Party of Democratic Socialism, he served in the Landtag of Thuringia from 1990 to 1999.

Höpcke died in Berlin on 14 October 2023, at the age of 89.
