= André Monnier =

French ski jumper (1926–2023)

André Monnier (26 June 1926 – 8 October 2023) was a French ski jumper who competed in the early 1950s. He finished tied for 36th in the individual large hill event at the 1952 Winter Olympics in Oslo. Monnier died in Chamblay on 8 October 2023, at the age of 97.
