= Richard Eppley =

American biological oceanographer

Richard W. Eppley
- Born: October 12, 1931; Puyallup, WA
- Died: October 7, 2023 (aged 91); La Jolla, California
- Education: Washington State University (BS); Stanford
- Occupation: Biological oceanographer
- Known for: phytoplankton physiology
- Spouse: Alice Jean Eppley

Richard Eppley (October 12, 1931 - October 7, 2023), was a biological oceanographer at Scripps Institution of Oceanography.
