= Đào Nguyên Cát =

Vietnamese economist (1927–2023)

Đào Nguyên Cát (1927 – 6 October 2023) was a Vietnamese economist, professor and journalist. He was the founding and editor-in-chief of The Vietnam Economic Times, one of the country's oldest and most influential economics and business publications. He played a prominent role during Vietnam's Đổi Mới economic reform, and served as the Chairman of the Vietnam Economic Association. Professor Cát was awarded the Resistance Medal (2nd Class Honor) by the Government of Vietnam. Cát died on 6 October 2023, at the age of 96.
