= Romano Voltolina =

Italian footballer (1937–2023)

Personal information
- Date of birth: 4 November 1937
- Place of birth: Chioggia, Italy
- Date of death: 5 October 2023 (aged 85)
- Place of death: Parma, Italy
- Position: Forward

Youth career
- Juventus

Senior career*
Years	Team	Apps	(Gls)
1956–1959	Juventus	5	(1)
1957–1958	→ Parma	15	(5)
1958–1959	→ Siena	19	(8)
1959–1960	Venezia	17	(0)
1960–1961	Cesena	23	(4)
1961–1964	Biellese	79	(14)
1964–1965	Massese	21	(3)
1965–1966	Siderno	27	(14)
1966–1967	Massiminiana	13	(1)
Total		219	(50)
- * Club domestic league appearances and goals

Romano Voltolina (4 November 1937 – 5 October 2023) was an Italian footballer who played as a forward.

== Biography ==
Born in Chioggia on 4 November 1937, Voltolina played youth football for Juventus, making his professional debut during the 1956–57 Serie A season in a match against Triestina. The following season, he was loaned to Parma. After another loan season with Siena, he returned to Juventus one final time. In later seasons, he played for Cesena, Biellese, and Massese. He ended his career with Siderno and Massiminiana.

Voltolina died in Parma on 5 October 2023, at the age of 85.
