= Evangelos Pentaris =

Greek naval captain and politician (1933–2023)

Member of the Hellenic Parliament for Piraeus B
- In office 18 October 1981 – 2 June 1989

Personal details
- Born: 5 June 1933 Chania, Greece
- Died: 9 October 2023 (aged 90)
- Party: PASOK
- Occupation: Naval captain

Evangelos Pentaris (Greek: Ευάγγελος Πεντάρης; 5 June 1933 – 9 October 2023) was a Greek naval captain and politician. A member of PASOK, he served in the Hellenic Parliament from 1981 to 1989.

Pentaris died on 9 October 2023, at the age of 90.
