= Nikolay Pivovarov =

Russian politician (1931–2023)

- Николай Пивоваров
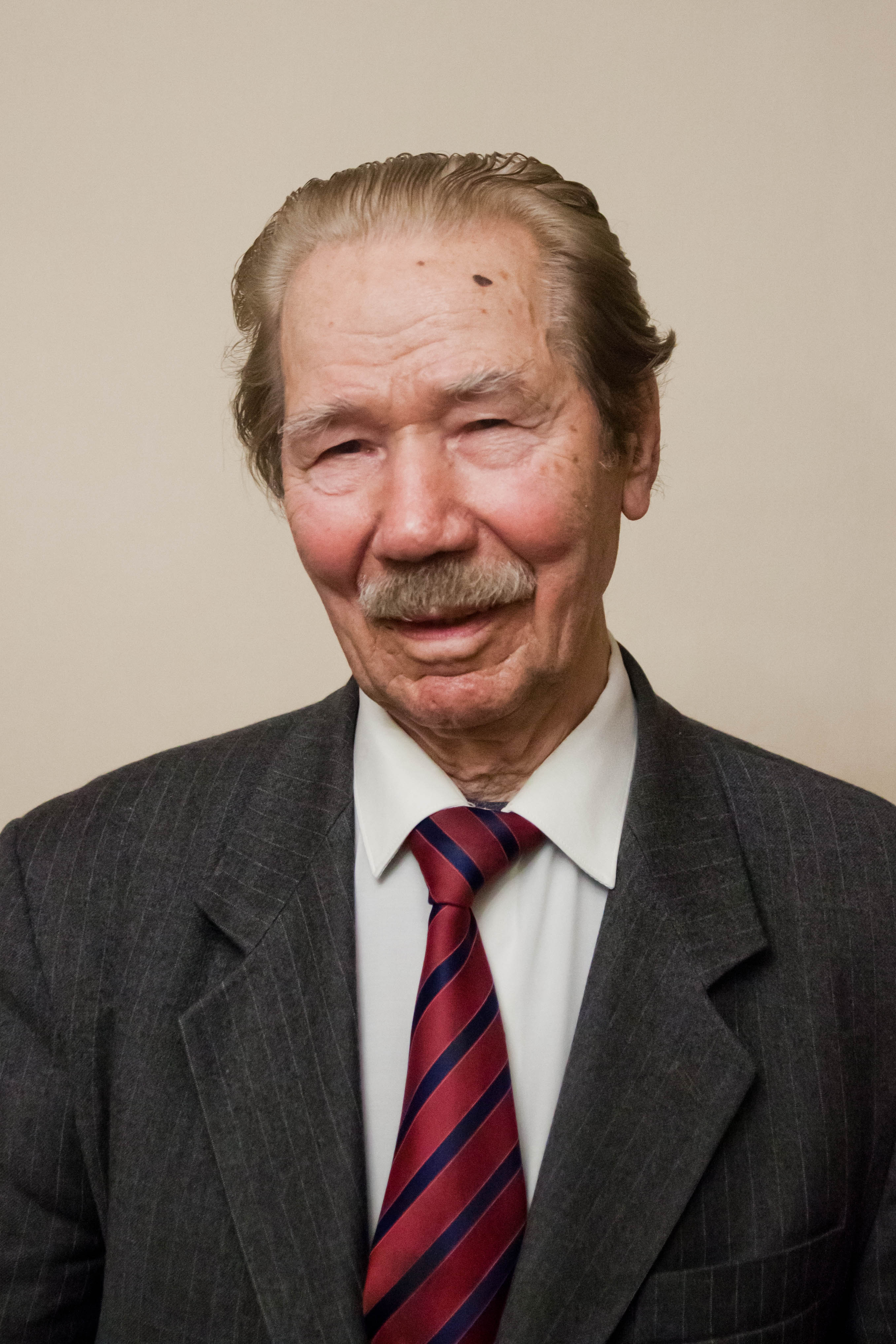
- Pivovarov in 2017

Member of the Supreme Soviet of the Russian Soviet Federative Socialist Republic
- In office 1980–1990

Personal details
- Born: Nikolay Dmitriyevich Pivovarov; 24 April 1931 Shakhty, Rostov Oblast, Russian SFSR, USSR
- Died: 1 October 2023 (aged 92) Rostov-on-Don, Russia
- Party: CPSU
- Education: South Russian State Polytechnic University; Higher Party School at the Central Committee of the CPSU
- Occupation: Engineer

Nikolay Dmitriyevich Pivovarov (Russian: Николай Дмитриевич Пивоваров; 24 April 1931 – 1 October 2023) was a Soviet and Russian engineer and politician. A member of the Communist Party of the Soviet Union, he served in the Supreme Soviet of the Russian Soviet Federative Socialist Republic from 1980 to 1990.

Pivovarov died on 1 October 2023, at the age of 92.
