= Alan Teasdale =

Australian rules footballer (1944–2023)

Personal information
- Full name: Alan Teasdale
- Born: 15 July 1944
- Died: 25 October 2023 (aged 79)
- Original team: Mildura South
- Height: 180 cm (5 ft 11 in)
- Weight: 80 kg (176 lb)

Playing career^{1}
Years	Club	Games (Goals)
1964–1966	Geelong	17 (13)
- ^{1} Playing statistics correct to the end of 1966.

Alan Teasdale (15 July 1944 – 25 October 2023) was an Australian rules footballer who played for the Geelong Football Club in the Victorian Football League (VFL). Teasdale died on 25 October 2023, at the age of 79.
