= Kim Yeong-do =

South Korean mountaineer and politician (1924–2023)

Member of the National Assembly of South Korea
- In office 12 March 1973 – 11 March 1979

Personal details
- Born: 18 October 1924 Chongju, Korea, Empire of Japan
- Died: 21 October 2023 (aged 99) Uijeongbu, South Korea
- Education: Seoul National University
- Occupation: Mountaineer

Kim Yeong-do (Korean: 김영도; 18 October 1924 – 21 October 2023) was a South Korean mountaineer and politician. He served in the National Assembly from 1973 to 1979.

Kim died in Uijeongbu on 21 October 2023, at the age of 99.
