= Omar Abu Shawish =

Palestinian poet and writer (1987–2023)

Omar Fares Abu Shawish
- عمر فارس أبو شاويش
- Born: Omar Fares Omar Abu Shawish; 22 March 1987; Nuseirat Camp, Gaza Strip, Palestine
- Died: 7 October 2023 (aged 36); Nuseirat Camp, Gaza Strip, Palestine
- Cause of death: Israeli airstrike
- Occupations: Poet, novelist, journalist and social activist

Omar Fares Abu Shawish (Arabic: عمر فارس أبو شاويش; 22 March 1987 – 7 October 2023) was a Palestinian poet, journalist, social activist and novelist. He was a well-known social activist at the Nuseirat refugee camp. He was killed at the refugee camp by an Israeli airstrike in the Gaza war.

== Biography ==
Abu Shawish was born in the Nuseirat refugee camp on 22 March 1987. His family are refugees from Barqa, Gaza, which was occupied and depopulated on 13 May 1948 during Operation Barak, a Yishuv offensive in southern Palestine just prior to the outbreak of the 1948 Arab–Israeli War. He received a bachelor's degree in journalism from Al-Azhar University, Gaza. He was a member of the General Union for Palestinian Writers and the People's Committee for Refugees. He was a co-founder of the Palestine Youth Cultural Network. He also wrote a number of patriotic and humanitarian songs, which spread widely during the Gaza War (2008–2009).

He won several local and international awards, including:

- “Best National Song of the Year 2007” award at the International Festival of National Song and Heritage in Jordan
- “Distinguished Volunteer and Ideal Young” award in 2010 within the National Festival honoring Palestinian volunteers, at the initiative of the Sharek Youth Forum in Palestine and sponsored by the Palestinian Supreme Council for Youth and Sports
- “Distinguished Arab Youth in the Field of Media, Journalism and Culture” award for the year 2013 by the Arab Youth Council for Integrated Development of the Arab League.

He published a number of collections of poetry, and a novel, titled 'Alā qayd al-mawt (Arabic: على قيد الموت), which was published by Bayt al-Yasmin in 2016. His novel was critically received in Palestine. The book was republished by Al Manhal in 2018.

On 7 October 2023, he was killed in an Israeli airstrike which hit his home in Nuseirat Camp during the Gaza war.

== Works ==
- على قيد الموت (in Arabic) (1st ed.). Bayt al-Yāsmı̄n lil-Nashr wa-al-Tawzı̄ʼ. 2016. ISBN 978-977-6402-97-3. LCCN 2016357899. OCLC 1026644340. OL 44527504M.
