= Sepp Klasen =

German politician (1935–2023)

Member of the Landtag of Bavaria
- In office 3 December 1970 – 24 October 1990

Personal details
- Born: Josef Klasen; 2 March 1935 Höchstberg, Germany
- Died: 4 October 2023 (aged 88)
- Party: SPD
- Education: LMU Munich
- Occupation: Lawyer

Josef "Sepp" Klasen (2 March 1935 – 4 October 2023) was a German lawyer and politician. A member of the Social Democratic Party, he served in the Landtag of Bavaria from 1970 to 1990.

Klasen died on 4 October 2023, at the age of 88.
