= William A. Berning =

American politician

Member of the Indiana House of Representatives
- In office 1960–1966

Personal details
- Born: William Arthur Berning; November 26, 1931
- Died: October 18, 2023 (aged 91) Fort Wayne, Indiana, U.S.
- Party: Republican
- Education: Valparaiso University

William Arthur Berning (November 26, 1931 – October 18, 2023) was an American politician. A member of the Republican Party, he served in the Indiana House of Representatives from 1960 to 1966.

Berning died at his home in Fort Wayne, Indiana on October 18, 2023, at the age of 92.
