= Gerry Cranham =

English sports photographer (1929–2023)

Gerald Ernest Harold Cranham (1 February 1929 – 20 October 2023) was an English sports photographer.

== Life and career ==
Gerald Ernest Henry Cranham was born in Hampshire, England on 1 February 1929.

Cranham was a promising middle-distance runner, but stopped due to injury. After that, he became a sports photographer, establishing himself as one of the pioneering sports photographers of the 20th century.

Gerry Cranham died on 20 October 2023, at the age of 94.
