= David H. Montplaisir =

American politician (1936–2023)

Member of the North Dakota House of Representatives
- In office 1965–1966

Personal details
- Born: February 11, 1936 Fargo, North Dakota, U.S.
- Died: October 2, 2023 (aged 87)
- Party: Democratic

David H. Montplaisir (February 11, 1936 – October 2, 2023) was an American politician. He served as a Democratic member of the North Dakota House of Representatives.

== Life and career ==
Montplaisir was born in Fargo, North Dakota, on February 11, 1936. He served in the North Dakota House of Representatives from 1965 to 1966. He died on October 2, 2023, at the age of 87.
