= Bob Pomphrey =

English cricketer (1944–2023)

Personal information
- Full name: Robert Henry Pomphrey
- Born: 6 October 1944; Warminster, Wiltshire, England
- Died: 24 October 2023 (aged 79)
- Batting: Right-handed

Domestic team information
- Years: Team
- 1979: Minor Counties South
- 1971–1985: Hertfordshire

Career statistics
Competition	List A
Matches	7
Runs scored	56
Batting average	8.00
100s/50s	–/
Top score	22
Catches/stumpings	1/–
- Source: Cricinfo, 7 June 2011

Robert Henry Pomphrey (6 October 1944 – 24 October 2023) was an English cricketer. Pomphrey was a right-handed batsman. He was born at Warminster, Wiltshire.

Pomphrey made his debut for Hertfordshire in the 1971 Minor Counties Championship against Buckinghamshire. Pomphrey played Minor counties cricket for Hertfordshire from 1971 to 1985, which included 90 Minor Counties Championship matches. He made his List A debut against Durham in the 1974 Gillette Cup. He made five further List A appearances for the county, the last coming against Essex in the 1981 NatWest Trophy. In his six List A matches, he scored 54 runs at an average of 9.00, with a high score of 22. He also played a single List A match for Minor Counties South against Somerset in the 1979 Benson & Hedges Cup. In his only match for the team, he was dismissed for two by Vic Marks.

Pomphrey died on 24 October 2023, at the age of 79.
