= Vietnam Economic Times =

Vietnamese monthly newspaper

The Vietnam Economic Times is a monthly newspaper of Vietnam, covering national business and economic issues. It is published in both Vietnamese and English and has been published online since at least 1997. The English-language magazine was launched in 1994 under a business cooperation contract between the Vietnamese Association of Economists and Ringier of Switzerland. Its founding and current editor-in-chief is Professor Đào Nguyên Cát.
