= Daniel Eckenspieller =

French politician (1931–2023)

Member of the French Senate for Haut-Rhin
- In office 24 September 1995 – 30 September 2004

Mayor of Illzach
- In office 13 March 1983 – 30 March 2014
- Preceded by: Joseph Biechlin
- Succeeded by: Jean-Luc Schildknecht

Personal details
- Born: 15 December 1931 Riedisheim, France
- Died: 28 October 2023 (aged 91) Illzach, France
- Party: RPR; UMP

Daniel Eckenspieller (15 December 1931 – 28 October 2023) was a French politician of the Rally for the Republic (RPR) and the Union for a Popular Movement (UMP).

== Biography ==
Born in Riedisheim on 15 December 1931, Eckenspieller served as Mayor of Illzach from 1983 to 2014 and was a Senator for Haut-Rhin from 1995 to 2004.

Daniel Eckenspieller died in Illzach on 28 October 2023, at the age of 91.
