= Ružica Nikolić =

Serbian politician (1976–2023)

Ružica Nikolić (Serbian Cyrillic: Ружица Николић; 1976 – 25 October 2023) was a Serbian politician. She served in the National Assembly of Serbia from 2017 to 2020 as a member of the far-right Serbian Radical Party.

== Early life and career ==
Nikolić was born in Belgrade, then part of the Socialist Republic of Serbia in the Socialist Federal Republic of Yugoslavia. She was a surdologist (similar to an audiologist) based in her home city.

== Political career ==
Nikolić received the 184th position on the Radical Party's electoral list in the 2008 Serbian parliamentary election. The party won seventy-eight seats, and she was not included in its assembly delegation. (From 2000 to 2011, Serbian parliamentary mandates were awarded to sponsoring parties or coalitions rather than to individual candidates, and it was common practice for mandates to be awarded out of numerical order. Nikolić could have received a mandate despite her relatively low list position, although ultimately this did not occur.)

The Radical Party experienced a serious split in late 2008, with many prominent members joining the breakaway Serbian Progressive Party under the leadership of Tomislav Nikolić and Aleksandar Vučić. Ružica Nikolić remained with the Radicals.

Serbia's electoral system was reformed in 2011, such that parliamentary mandates were awarded in numerical order to candidates on successful lists. Nikolić received the thirty-ninth position on the Radical Party's list in the 2012 election and the eighty-seventh position in the 2014 election. On both occasions, the party failed to cross the electoral threshold to win representation in the assembly.

Nikolić was promoted to the twenty-fourth position on the party's list for the 2016 election and was not immediately elected when the party won twenty-two seats. She was awarded a mandate on 19 July 2017 as a replacement for Jovo Ostojić, who had recently died. She served as an opposition member and was a member of the assembly's committee on human and minority rights and gender equality.

Nikolić appeared in the thirty-sixth position on the Radical Party's list in the 2020 and the 2022 Serbian parliamentary elections. In each case, the list failed to cross the electoral threshold.

== Death ==
Ružica Nikolić died on 25 October 2023.
