= Pierre Nzila =

Congolese politician (1947/1948 – 2023)

Pierre Nzila (1947/1948 – 25 October 2023) was a Congolese politician. A member of the Congolese Labour Party (PCT), he served in the government of Congo-Brazzaville as Minister of Basic and Secondary Education from 1997 to 1999 and subsequently as Minister of Primary, Secondary and Higher Education from 1999 to 2002. He was a Deputy in the National Assembly of Congo-Brazzaville from 2002 to 2012, heading the National Assembly's Defense and Security Commission throughout that time. He served as Ambassador to Gabon from 2013.

== Biography ==
Following the June–October 1997 civil war, Nzila was appointed to the government as Minister of Basic and Secondary Education on 2 November 1997. Subsequently he was appointed Minister of Primary and Secondary Education, Higher Education, and Scientific Research on 12 January 1999.

In the May–June 2002 parliamentary election, Nzila was elected to the National Assembly as the PCT candidate in the Okoyo constituency of Cuvette West Region, winning the seat in the second round of voting. After the election, he was not included in the government that was appointed on 18 August 2002, and he was elected as President of the National Assembly's Defense and Security Commission on 24 August 2002. He took up the latter post on 5 September 2002.

In the June–August 2007 parliamentary election, Nzila stood again as the PCT candidate in Okoyo constituency. In the first round, he placed first with 30.76% of the vote against 20.59% for ACCORD candidate Martin Oyali. Nzila then won the seat in the second round of voting. Following that election, Nzila retained his post as President of the Defense and Security Commission when the National Assembly began meeting for the new parliamentary term in September 2007.

At the Sixth Extraordinary Congress of the Congolese Labour Party (PCT), held in July 2011, Nzila was elected to the PCT's 471-member Central Committee.

Nzila did not stand for re-election to the National Assembly in the July–August 2007 parliamentary election, but he was appointed Ambassador to Gabon and presented his credentials to Gabonese President Ali Bongo Ondimba on 19 March 2013. Along with other African ambassadors posted to Gabon, Nzila visited the Albert Schweitzer Hospital at Lambaréné on 1 March 2014.

Pierre Nzila died in a traffic accident on 25 October 2023, at the age of 75.
