= Richard J. Lesniak =

American politician (1939–2023)

Member of the Indiana House of Representatives from the 1st district
- In office November 6, 1968 – November 8, 1972

Personal details
- Born: March 29, 1939 East Chicago, Indiana, U.S.
- Died: October 1, 2023 (aged 84)
- Party: Democratic
- Education: Wabash College; Indiana University

Richard J. Lesniak (March 29, 1939 – October 1, 2023) was an American politician. He served as a Democratic member for the 1st district of the Indiana House of Representatives.

== Life and career ==
Richard J. Lesniak was born in East Chicago, Indiana, on March 29, 1939. He attended Wabash College and Indiana University.

Lesniak served in the Indiana House of Representatives from 1968 to 1972.

Lesniak died on October 1, 2023, at the age of 84.
