= Saleh Al-Gholab =

Jordanian politician (1944–2023)

Saleh Al-Qallab

Minister of Culture
- In office 15 January 2000 – 19 June 2000

Minister of Information and State
- In office 19 June 2000 – 14 January 2002

Personal details
- Born: 1944
- Died: 25 October 2023 (aged 79)
- Party: Jordanian Arab Socialist Ba'ath Party (until 1970); Independent
- Education: Lebanese University
- Occupation: Journalist

Saleh Al-Gholab (Arabic: صالح القلاب; 1944 – 25 October 2023) was a Jordanian journalist and politician. An independent, he served as Minister of Culture from January to June 2000 and Minister of Information and State from 2000 to 2002.

Al-Gholab died on 25 October 2023, at the age of 79.
