= Mahinder Rathipal =

Surinamese politician (1956–2023)

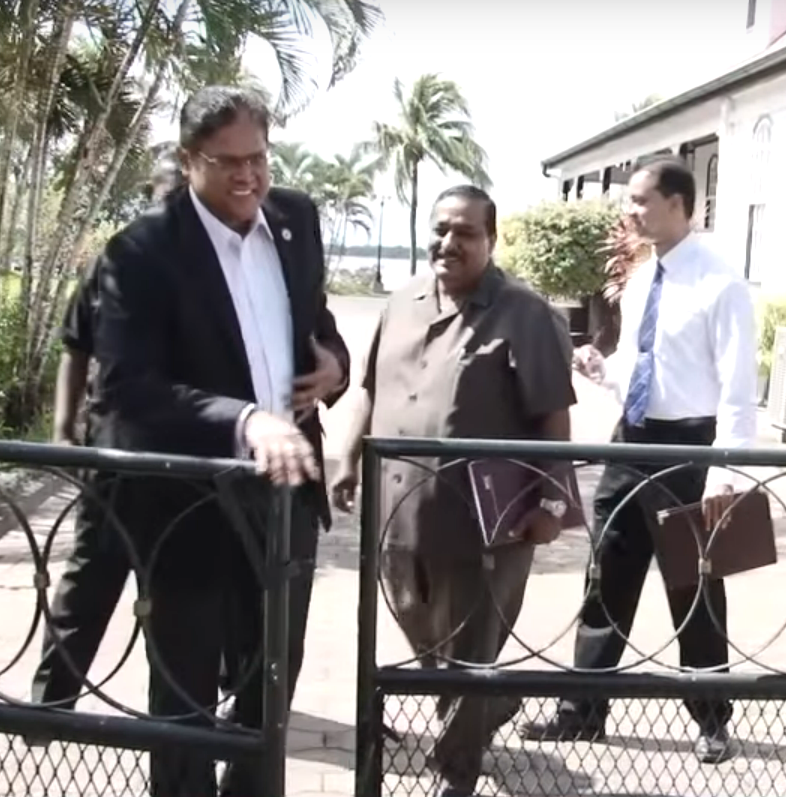
- Rathipal (middle) with Chan Santokhi and Riad Nurmohamed in 2015

Member of the National Assembly of Suriname
- In office 14 September 2000 – September 2015

Personal details
- Born: Mahinderpersad Rathipal; 10 March 1956 Paramaribo, Suriname
- Died: 4 October 2023 (aged 67)
- Party: VHP

Mahinderpersad Rathipal (10 March 1956 – 4 October 2023) was a Surinamese politician. A member of the Progressive Reform Party, he served in the National Assembly from 2000 to 2015.

Rathipal died on 4 October 2023, at the age of 67.
