= Felipe Diogo =

Brazilian footballer (2002–2023)

Personal information
- Full name: Felipe Diogo Bernardes Ferreira
- Date of birth: 19 January 2002
- Place of birth: Ribeirão Preto, São Paulo, Brazil
- Date of death: 31 October 2023 (aged 21)
- Place of death: Ribeirão Preto, São Paulo, Brazil
- Height: 1.72 m (5 ft 8 in)
- Position: Forward

Youth career
- 2017–2018: Comercial-SP
- 2018: Cruzeiro
- 2019: Botafogo-SP
- 2020–2021: Avaí
- 2021–2022: São Bernardo

Senior career*
Years	Team	Apps	(Gls)
2022–2023	São Bernardo	18	(4)
- * Club domestic league appearances and goals

Felipe Diogo Bernardes Ferreira (19 January 2002 – 31 October 2023), better known as Felipe Diogo, was a Brazilian professional footballer who played as a forward for São Bernardo.

== Career ==
With spells at Comercial, Botafogo, Cruzeiro and Avaí at youth level, Diogo only played professionally for São Bernardo, in the 2022 and 2023 seasons.

== Death ==
Felipe Diogo was shot dead in his hometown, Ribeirão Preto, during the player vacations after the end of the 2023 São Bernardo FC season. He was hit 10 times and died at the scene. Diogo was 21. The motives for the homicide remain under investigation.

== See also ==
- List of association football players who died during their careers
