= Ron Kee =

Australian rules footballer (1938–2023)

Personal information
- Full name: Ronald Alexander Kee
- Born: 4 November 1938
- Died: 24 October 2023 (aged 84)
- Original team: Leongatha / Korumburra
- Height: 188 cm (6 ft 2 in)
- Weight: 85 kg (187 lb)

Playing career^{1}
| Years | Club | Games (Goals) |
| 1959 | St Kilda | 2 (2) |
| 1961–63 | Moorabbin (VFA) | 35 (70) |
| 1964 | Brighton-Caulfield (VFA) | 11 (23) |
- ^{1} Playing statistics correct to the end of 1959.

Career highlights
- 1963 VFA Premiership

Ronald Alexander Kee (4 November 1938 – 24 October 2023) was an Australian rules footballer who played with St Kilda in the Victorian Football League (VFL). Kee died on 24 October 2023, at the age of 84.
