= Daniel Giraud =

French writer and poet (1946–2023)

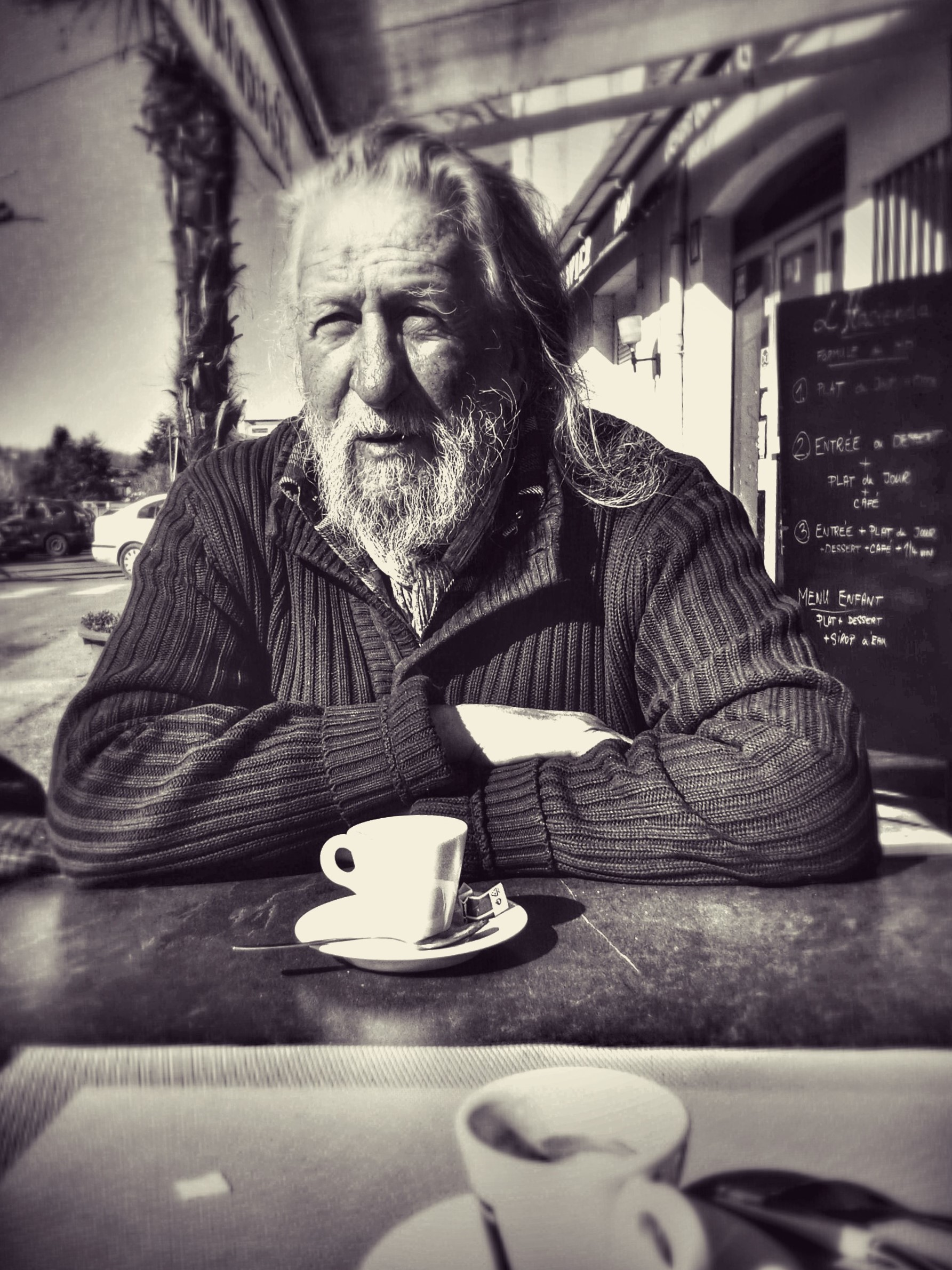
- Giraud in 2015
- Born: 10 January 1946; Marseille, France
- Died: 6 October 2023 (aged 77); Saint-Girons, Ariège, France
- Education: École supérieure d'art et de design Marseille-Méditerranée
- Occupations: Writer; Poet

Daniel Giraud (10 January 1946 – 6 October 2023) was a French essayist, translator, and poet. He was also a blues musician under the stage name Dan Giraud.

Giraud translated the poems of Oriental writers such as Li Bai, Hanshan, Ryōkan, and Sengcan. He also wrote works on Chan Buddhism, alchemy, and astrology.

== Biography ==
Born in Marseille on 10 January 1946, Giraud studied drawing at the École supérieure d'art et de design Marseille-Méditerranée. In 1966, he earned a diploma as an assistant film director at the film school of the Conservatoire libre du cinéma français in Paris. In 1972, he moved to the Ariège department, where he lived for the rest of his life.

In 1977, Giraud created the poetic and metaphysic magazine Révolution Intérieure, which published its last edition in 1987 due to financial problems. In 1981, he played the role of a peddler in the film The Return of Martin Guerre, directed by Daniel Vigne. During the 1990s, he conducted several interviews, received multiple scholarships, and took a number of trips, particularly to Africa and Asia.

Daniel Giraud committed suicide in Saint-Girons, Ariège, on 6 October 2023, at the age of 77.

== Publications ==
=== Essays ===
- L'État et la Religion ou La pourriture du corps et de l'esprit : au révolté, mon allié; au libertaire, mon frère... (1967)
- Primauté et liberté de l'individu (1968)
- Friedrich Nietzsche : dithyrambe à Dionysios le crucifié (1970)
- L’Être et le cosmos (1972)
- Le Silence de l’abîme (1975)
- Être sans Être (1979)
- Le Soleil, le Cœur et l’Or (1983)
- Embrassant l’Entre-deux (1986)
- Ivre de Tao, Li Po (1989)
- Métaphysique de l’astrologie (1989)
- Jean Carteret, alchimiste du verbe (1993)
- Le Rien du Tout (1999)
- Lilith, la Lune Noire (2000)
- Tout est vain (2009)
- Thélème de Rabelais (2010)
- Hi k'ang : Un sage taoïste dans une forêt de bambous (2012)
- Agir sans agir (2012)
- Tao et anarchie (2017)
- Je cherche un homme (2017)
- Le passager des bancs publics (2021)

=== Translations ===
- Gravé au cœur de la foi (1986)
- I Ching et Tao Te Ching (1989)
- Hsin Hsin Ming, traité de spiritualité Ch'an du VIe siècle (1992)
- Les Yeux du Dragon, une anthologie de poésie chinoise (1993)
- Tchouang Tseu (1993)
- Écrits de l’Esprit - Le Sin Sin Ming et le Sin Ming (2006)
- Yi King, texte et interprétation (2008)
- Lao Tseu, le Livre de la Voie et de la conduite (2011)
- La Voie de Montfroid (2011)
- Le Fils de la Montagne froide (2016)
- L'art d'apprivoiser le buffle, les dix images du buffle

=== Stories and novels ===
- Le Voyage vertical (1980)
- Les Étoiles en plein jour (1984)
- Au Vif de l’instant (1990)
- Randonnée chinoise (1993)
- Quelque part (2002)
- Rem le sage, vie et œuvre d’un hérésiarque (2006)
- Récits de sagesse d'Extrême-Orient : Récits du Tao, du Tch'an et du Zen (2007)
- Feeling (2007)
- La Palpite (2009)
- Les buveurs de sang (2011)
- Libertalia, presqu'île de la liberté (2015)

=== Poetry ===
- La Négation fait l’homme (1969)
- Lumière d’encre (1972)
- Il était une fois dans le sud-ouest (1974)
- Le Sang de la tête (1976)
- L’espace du silence (1984)
- L’échappée belle (1987)
- Un Casse-dalle pour ne pas la crever (1989)
- Transit à Saint-Naze (1994)
- Par Voie et par chemins (1994)
- Flanant sous le ciel: ballade autour d'une quarantaine de poèmes chinois du Tao et du Ch'an (1994)
- Les Chrysanthèmes dans le cercueil (1996)
- Le Journal des secrets (1997)
- Sagesse libertaire (1997)
- A cœur perdu (2000)
- Qu’ai-je fait au ciel pour mériter la terre ? (2003)
- Li Po, l’exilé du ciel (2004)
- Conduite intérieure (2008)
- Intérieur/Extérieur (2010)
- Ouaille ! (2012)
- All to no-thing (2014)
- La tournante des images et des ombres (2015)
- Le poids des nuages (2021)

=== Astrology ===
- Guide d’interprétation astrologique (1988)
- Cours complet d'astrologie en 36 leçons (2003)
- Comment s'affranchir de son thème astrologique (2016)

=== Newspapers ===
- Le Fond de l’air et l’âme de fond (1996)
- Brinquebale en Chine et au Turkestan (1996)

== Discography ==
=== Under "Daniel Giroud" ===
- La Palpite sans garde-fou

=== Under "Dan Giroud" ===
- Le Cri du chant
- Live à l'Alto Café
