= Noh In-hwan =

South Korean politician (1932–2023)

Member of the National Assembly of South Korea
- In office 12 March 1979 – 27 August 1980
- Preceded by: Jeong U-sik
- Succeeded by: Kwon Ik-hyun
- Constituency: Sancheong-gun–Hamyang-gun–Geochang-gun
- In office 30 May 1988 – 29 May 1996
- Preceded by: Kwon Ik-kyun (from Sancheong-gun–Hamyang-gun–Geochang-gun)
- Succeeded by: Kwon Ik-kyun
- Constituency: Sancheong-gun–Hamyang-gun

Personal details
- Born: 24 May 1932 Hamyang County, Korea, Empire of Japan
- Died: 7 October 2023 (aged 91)
- Party: DRP; DJP
- Education: Seoul National University; University of Maryland, College Park

Noh In-hwan (Korean: 노인환; 24 May 1932 – 7 October 2023) was a South Korean politician. A member of the Democratic Republican Party and later the Democratic Justice Party, he served in the National Assembly from 1979 to 1980 and again from 1988 to 1996.

Noh died on 7 October 2023, at the age of 91.
