= Max Davidson (footballer) =

Australian rules footballer (1934–2023)

Personal information
- Born: 30 July 1934
- Died: 25 October 2023 (aged 89); Scottsdale, Tasmania, Australia
- Original team: North Launceston
- Height: 175 cm (5 ft 9 in)
- Weight: 76 kg (168 lb)

Playing career^{1}
Years	Club	Games (Goals)
1956	Collingwood	16 (7)
- ^{1} Playing statistics correct to the end of 1956.

Maxwell Davidson (30 July 1934 – 25 October 2023) was an Australian rules footballer who played with Collingwood in the Victorian Football League (VFL). Davidson died in Scottsdale, Tasmania on 25 October 2023, at the age of 89.
