= Didier Mouly =

French politician (1951–2023)

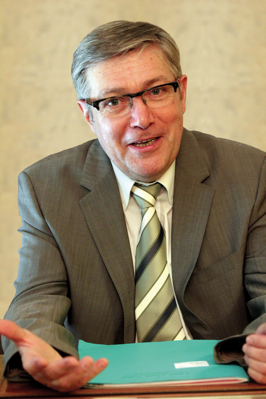
- Mouly in 2012

Mayor of Narbonne
- In office 6 April 2014 – 8 October 2023
- Preceded by: Jacques Bascou
- Succeeded by: Bertrand Malquier

President of Grand Narbonne
- In office 15 July 2020 – 8 October 2023
- Preceded by: Jacques Bascou
- Succeeded by: TBD

Personal details
- Born: 11 May 1951 Béziers, France
- Died: 8 October 2023 (aged 72) Narbonne, France
- Party: DVD
- Occupation: Lawyer

Didier Mouly (11 May 1951 – 8 October 2023) was a French lawyer and politician of the miscellaneous right (DVD).

== Biography ==
Born in Béziers on 11 May 1951, Didier was the son of Hubert Mouly, who was Mayor of Narbonne from 1971 to 1999, and the brother of lawyer and jurist Christian Mouly.

Mouly ran in the 2014 municipal election in Narbonne as the head of the DVD list. He earned 27.13% of votes in the first round and 45.19% of second-round votes, enough to elect him Mayor of Narbonne. He benefitted from the withdrawal of the Union for a Popular Movement-Union of Democrats and Independence list, which helped him to defeat outgoing Socialist Party Mayor Jacques Bascou. However, Bascou filed an appeal for the annulment of the election, which was rejected by the administrative court in Montpellier. In his first term, Mouly promised to focus on the development of employment, security, video surveillance, and decrease taxes. He also strengthened ties between Narbonne and Béziers, led by Robert Menard.

Running for re-election in 2020, Mouly led a right-wing list called "Nouveau Narbonne", which had been founded by his father. He obtained 34.63% of votes in the first round, and 43.57% in the second round, enough for re-election. He once again benefitted from divisions, this time a quadrangular divide on the left. After the election, he declared his readiness to "work with all elected officials", particularly Ménard and Louis Aliot. However, this was received with a negative reaction by President of the Regional Council of Occitania Carole Delga. In May 2021, his campaign accounts were rejected by the administrative court. He was elected President of Grand Narbonne on 15 July 2020.

Didier Mouly died of cancer on 8 October 2023, at the age of 72.
