= Marina Mizzau =

Italian writer (1936–2023)

- Born: 29 May 1936; Rome, Kingdom of Italy
- Died: 3 October 2023 (aged 87); Bologna, Italy
- Occupations: Writer; essayist; academic

Marina Mizzau (29 May 1936 – 3 October 2023) was an Italian writer, essayist and academic.

== Biography ==
Marina Mizzau graduated in philosophy with a thesis on aesthetics with Luciano Anceschi at the University of Bologna in 1960, at which she later became a professor. In the 1980s she was president of the DAMS degree course at the University of Bologna's Faculty of Letters. She was part of Gruppo 63 and tied to the magazine Il Verri. Mizzau carried out relevant research in the field of communication, dedicating herself to fiction as well, ending as one of the twelve finalists of the Strega Prize with the two novels she published with Manni. Mizzau participated in the foundation and numerous initiatives of the Women's Center of Bologna (Centro delle donne di Bologna, also known as Associazione Orlando), starting in 1983.

Mizzau died in Bologna on 3 October 2023, at the age of 87.
