= Gien van Maanen =

Dutch handball and football player (1936–2023)

Gien van Maanen (1936 – 30 October 2023) was a Dutch handball and football player, who was a pioneer of Dutch football: she was the first goalkeeper for the Netherlands women's national football team, and was also goalkeeper for the Netherlands women's handball team.

== Biography ==
Van Maanen was born in 1936. She grew up in Utrecht, and played handball competitively starting in 1950; in the evenings she played football in the street with the local boys. At the time women were not allowed to play football; the Royal Dutch Football Association did not think football was suitable for women. Nevertheless she persisted, and in 1955, she and other women founded their own football club, Herbido, a name derived from the men's clubs Hercules, Bilthoven, and DOS. Sixty women became members, but they had to organize their own matches and trainings, with van Maanen as one of the driving forces. This was the first (unofficial) Netherlands women's football team.

In September 1956 she was the goalie for the Dutch team that played West Germany in Essen, a match considered the first international match for Dutch women. The Dutch lost 2–1. Because van Maanen was also a sought-after handball player, she had to choose between the two sports, and in 1959 she decided to dedicate herself to handball. She played on the Netherlands handball team until 1968, playing 32 international matches. The Dutch football women would not play an official international match until 1971. According to Remco Neu, footballer historian and friend of van Maanen, the Dutch women would have never won the UEFA Women's Euro 2017 tournament.

Van Maanen died on 30 October 2023, aged 87.
