= Shahida Qazi =

Pakistani journalist (1944–2023)

- Born: 1944
- Died: 28 October 2023 (aged 78–79)
- Occupations: Journalist, Scriptwriter

Shahida Qazi (1944 – 28 October 2023) was a Pakistani journalist and academic, who was the first woman to be recognised as a correspondent in Pakistan.

== Career ==
In 1963, she was the country's first and only woman to be enrolled in the then-newly established department of journalism at the University of Karachi. Qazi joined Dawn newspaper in 1966 and became the first female reporter in Pakistan. She was an active member of the Karachi Press Club and made efforts to facilitate women journalists. She later worked for the PTV for 18 years. She also served as the chairperson of mass communication at the University of Karachi and the Mohammad Ali Jinnah University.

== Death ==
Shahida Qazi died on 28 October 2023, at the age of 79.
