= Peter Olausson =

Swedish author (1971–2023)

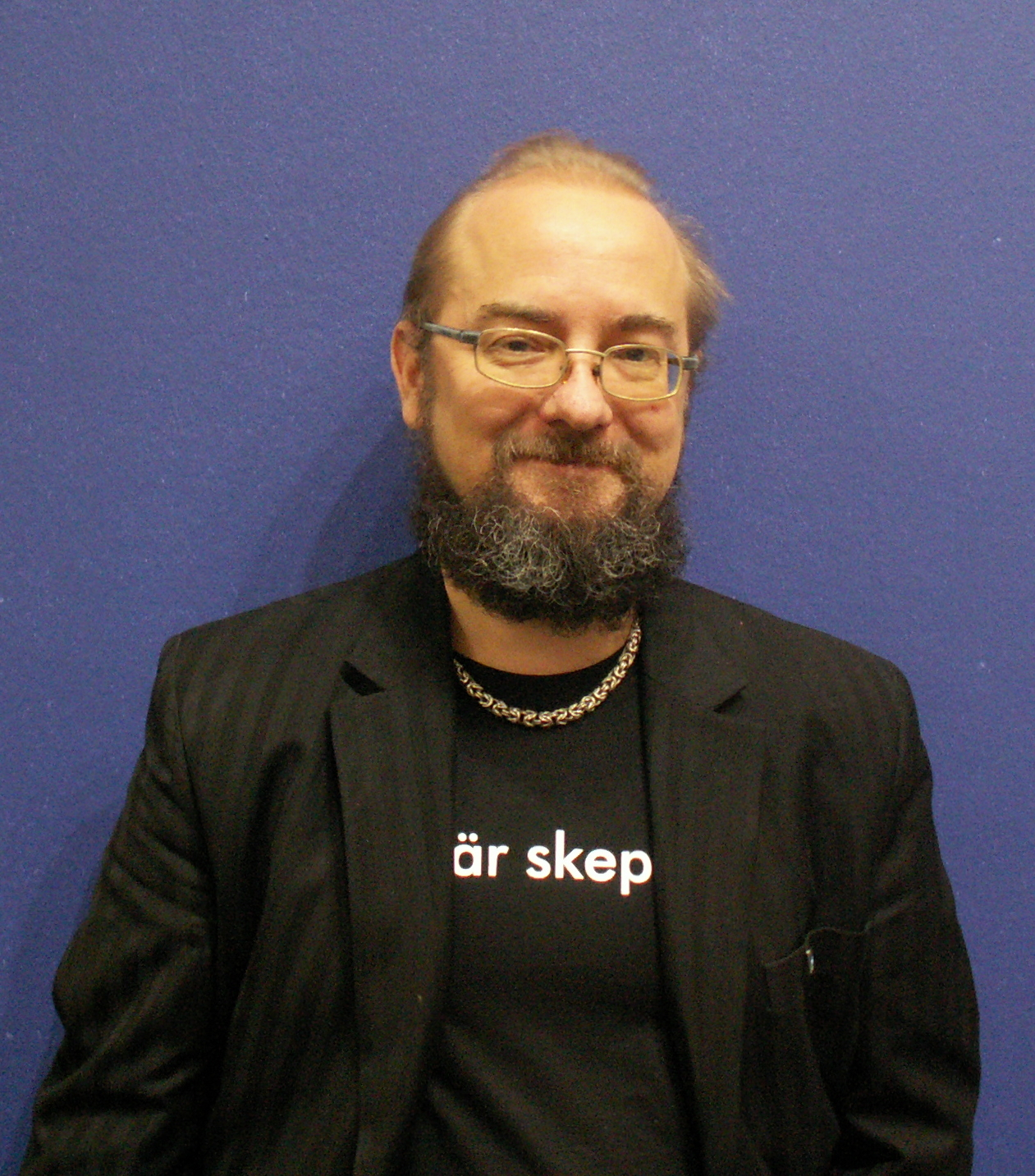
- Olausson in 2017
- Born: 6 November 1971; Långekärr, Tjörn, Sweden
- Died: 26 October 2023 (aged 51)
- Occupation: Author
- Writing career
- Genre: Factoids
- Notable work: Factoids
- Literary movement: Skeptical movement
- Website: Official website

Peter Gustav Olausson (6 November 1971 – 26 October 2023) was a Swedish author and webmaster. Between 2003 and 2023 he collected and published factoids, on the Internet as well as in several books.

== Biography ==
Olausson was born on 6 November 1971, on Tjörn, Sweden, where he was also raised. He was educated in computational linguistics and worked as a webmaster.

From 2003 Olausson collected factoids, a term that has been compared to "urban legend". He has described and published these on the Internet and in several books. The first book was published in 2008, and book number three in the series has been translated to Norwegian.

In 2009 he participated in the radio series Mytjägarna, in which Olausson and the program leader Tobias Svanelid searched for popular misconceptions, factoids and myths. The eight programs in the program series have since been repeated several times, the last time during the summer of 2012.

Olausson was a board member of the Swedish Skeptics Association on various occasions and from 2017 to 2018 he was chairman of the association. From 2012 he was a board member of the association's Gothenburg chapter and from 2015 its chairman. In March 2017 he left his role as chairman, which was taken over by Karin Noomi Karlsson.

Peter Olausson died on 26 October 2023, at the age of 51.

== Books ==
- Olausson, Peter (2008). Faktoider försanthållna osanningar, halvsanningar och missuppfattningar (in Swedish). Stockholm: Forum. p. 384. ISBN 978-91-37-13257-0.
- Olausson, Peter (2009). Fler faktoider: fler försanthållna osanningar, halvsanningar och missuppfattningar (in Swedish). Stockholm: Forum. p. 412. ISBN 978-91-37-13484-0.
- Olausson, Peter (2009). Är det verkligen sant? (in Swedish). Bromma: Ordalaget. p. 172. ISBN 978-91-85465-67-5.
- Olausson, Peter (2010). Nya ord med historia (in Swedish). Bromma: Ordalaget. p. 207. ISBN 978-91-85465-88-0.
- Olausson, Peter (2011). Tredje rikets myter (in Swedish). Stockholm: Forum. p. 437. ISBN 978-91-37-13611-0.
- Olausson, Peter (2012). Blindspår (in Swedish). Stockholm: Leopard förlag. p. 318. ISBN 978-91-7343-395-2.
- Olausson, Peter (2014). 1914: Vägen till första världskriget (in Swedish). Stockholm: Forum. p. 287. ISBN 978-91-37-14284-5.
- Olausson, Peter (2018). Sveriges historia: Från forntid till nutid (in Swedish). Ordalaget Bokförlag. p. 447. ISBN 978-91-74-69241-9.

== Awards ==
- 2019 – Det gyllene förstoringsglaset (from the Metro Newspaper "Viralgranskaren" + The Internet Foundation in Sweden)
