= Akoto Ampaw =

Ghanaian lawyer and human rights activist (1950–2023)

Anthony Akoto Ampaw

Lead Counsel for President Akufo-Addo: 2020 Election Petition.

Personal details
- Born: Anthony Akoto Ampaw; 1950 Hohoe, Gold Coast (now Ghana)
- Died: 20 October 2023 (aged 72–73) Accra, Ghana
- Relatives: Princess Consolata Akoto Ampaw (sister, deceased), Annette Akoto Ampaw (sister, deceased), Michael Akoto Ampaw, Bernard Akoto Ampaw, Dr. Ako Akoto Ampaw and four others
- Education: University of Ghana
- Alma mater: University of Ghana; Ghana School of Law; University of Ghana; Middle Temple
- Occupation: Lawyer and human rights activist

Anthony Akoto Ampaw (1950 – 20 October 2023) was a Ghanaian lawyer and human rights activist. He was the head of the legal team defending President Nana Addo Dankwa Akufo-Addo's win in the 2020 Presidential elections at the Supreme Court of Ghana.

== Education ==
Akoto Ampaw studied LL.B at University of Ghana in 1973 and was also a graduate from the Ghana school of law with B.L in 1993. He specialized in commercial law, company law, industrial law, litigation, constitutional and human rights law, media law, labour law, investment law

== Death ==
The late lawyer Akoto Ampaw died at University of Ghana medical center(UGMC) on 20 October 2023. The one- week observance of Ampaw was held on 5 November 2023 at the Akoto- Ampaw residence, North Keneshie, near the Holy Trinity Hospital in Accra.

== Legacy ==
The Ghana Journalists Association has honored him at their annual awards meant to recognize extra ordinary work meant to promote democracy and good governance in Ghana.

Friends of Ampaw, in collaboration with the Centre for Democratic Development and the Institute of African Studies at the University of Ghana, held a public lecture on 23 October 2024, to honor his legacy. The event, held on the University of Ghana campus in Accra, attracted many civil society organizations, individuals, students, stakeholders from the judiciary and education sectors, foreign envoys, and non-governmental organizations.

== Personal life ==
Akoto Ampaw married Akua Ampaw, a lawyer and a lecturer at the Ghana School of Law and they had four children.
