= 2023–24 in English football =

Football in England
- Season: 2023–24

Men's football
- Premier League: Manchester City
- Championship: Leicester City
- League One: Portsmouth
- League Two: Stockport County
- National League: Chesterfield
- FA Cup: Manchester United
- Community Shield: Arsenal
- EFL Cup: Liverpool
- EFL Trophy: Peterborough United

Women's football
- Women's Super League: Chelsea
- Women's Championship: Crystal Palace
- FA Women's National League Northern Premier Division: Newcastle United
- FA Women's National League Southern Premier Division: Portsmouth
- Women's FA Cup: Manchester United
- FA Women's League Cup: Arsenal

The 2023–24 season was the 144th competitive association football season in England.

== National teams ==
=== England men's national football team ===
==== Results and fixtures ====
===== Friendlies =====
| 12 September 2023 | Scotland | 1–3 | England | Glasgow, Scotland |
| 19:45 BST | Maguire 67' (o.g.) | Report | Foden 32'; Bellingham 35'; Kane 81' | Stadium: Hampden Park; Attendance: 51,000; Referee: Davide Massa (Italy) |

| 13 October 2023 | England | 1–0 | Australia | London, England |
| 19:45 BST | Watkins 57' | Report | | Stadium: Wembley Stadium; Attendance: 81,116; Referee: Stéphanie Frappart (France) |

| 23 March 2024 | England | 0–1 | Brazil | London, England |
| 19:00 BST | | Report | Endrick 80' | Stadium: Wembley Stadium; Attendance: 84,595; Referee: Artur Dias (Portugal) |

| 26 March 2024 | England | 2–2 | Belgium | London, England |
| 19:45 BST | Toney 17' (pen.); Bellingham 90+5' | Report | Tielemans 11', 36' | Stadium: Wembley Stadium; Attendance: 80,733; Referee: Sebastian Gishamer (Austria) |

| 3 June 2024 | England | 3–0 | Bosnia and Herzegovina | Newcastle, England |
| 19:45 BST | Palmer 65' (pen.); Alexander-Arnold 85'; Kane 89' | Report | | Stadium: St. James' Park; Attendance: 50,061; Referee: Rohit Saggi (Norway) |

| 7 June 2024 | England | 0–1 | Iceland | London, England |
| 19:45 BST | | Report | Þorsteinsson 12' | Stadium: Wembley Stadium; Attendance: 81,410; Referee: Davide Massa (Italy) |

===== UEFA Euro 2024 qualifying =====
====== Group C ======
| Pos | Team | Pld | W | D | L | GF | GA | GD | Pts | Qualification | (England) | (Italy) | (Ukraine) | (North Macedonia) | (Malta) |
|---|---|---|---|---|---|---|---|---|---|---|---|---|---|---|---|
| 1 | England | 8 | 6 | 2 | 0 | 22 | 4 | +18 | 20 | Qualify for final tournament | — | 3–1 | 2–0 | 7–0 | 2–0 |
| 2 | Italy | 8 | 4 | 2 | 2 | 16 | 9 | +7 | 14 (Note: Head-to-head points: Italy 4, Ukraine 1.) | Qualify for final tournament | 1–2 | — | 2–1 | 5–2 | 4–0 |
| 3 | Ukraine | 8 | 4 | 2 | 2 | 11 | 8 | +3 | 14 | Advance to play-offs via Nations League | 1–1 | 0–0 | — | 2–0 | 1–0 |
| 4 | North Macedonia | 8 | 2 | 2 | 4 | 10 | 20 | −10 | 8 | | 1–1 | 1–1 | 2–3 | — | 2–1 |
| 5 | Malta | 8 | 0 | 0 | 8 | 2 | 20 | −18 | 0 | | 0–4 | 0–2 | 1–3 | 0–2 | — |

Source: UEFA
Rules for classification: Qualification tiebreakers
Notes:

| 9 September 2023 | Ukraine | 1–1 | England | Wrocław, Poland |
| 17:00 BST | Zinchenko 26' | Report | Walker 41' | Stadium: Stadion Wrocław; Attendance: 39,000; Referee: Georgi Kabakov (Bulgaria) |

| 17 October 2023 | England | 3–1 | Italy | London, England |
| 19:45 BST | Kane 32' (pen.), 77'; Rashford 57' | Report | Scamacca 15' | Stadium: Wembley Stadium; Attendance: 83,194; Referee: Clément Turpin (France) |

| 17 November 2023 | England | 2–0 | Malta | London, England |
| 19:45 BST | Pepe 8' (o.g.); Kane 75' | Report | | Stadium: Wembley Stadium; Attendance: 81,388; Referee: Luis Godinho (Portugal) |

| 20 November 2023 | North Macedonia | 1–1 | England | Skopje, North Macedonia |
| 20:45 CEST (UTC+2) | Bardhi 41' | Report | Atanasov 59' (o.g.) | Stadium: Toše Proeski National Arena; Attendance: 27,982; Referee: Filip Glova (Slovakia) |

===== UEFA Euro 2024 =====
====== Group C ======
| Pos | Team | Pld | W | D | L | GF | GA | GD | Pts | Qualification |
|---|---|---|---|---|---|---|---|---|---|---|
| 1 | England | 3 | 1 | 2 | 0 | 2 | 1 | +1 | 5 | Advance to knockout stage |
| 2 | Denmark | 3 | 0 | 3 | 0 | 2 | 2 | 0 | 3 (Note: Tied on head-to-head result (Slovenia 1–1 Denmark), overall goal difference and overall goals scored. Disciplinary points: Denmark −6, Slovenia −7.) | Advance to knockout stage |
| 3 | Slovenia | 3 | 0 | 3 | 0 | 2 | 2 | 0 | 3 | Advance to knockout stage |
| 4 | Serbia | 3 | 0 | 2 | 1 | 1 | 2 | −1 | 2 | |

Source: UEFA
Notes:

| 16 June 2024 | Serbia | 0–1 | England | Gelsenkirchen, Germany |
| 21:00 CEST (UTC+2) | | Report | Bellingham 13' | Stadium: Arena AufSchalke; Attendance: 48,953; Referee: Daniele Orsato (Italy) |

| 20 June 2024 | Denmark | 1–1 | England | Frankfurt, Germany |
| 18:00 CEST (UTC+2) | Hjulmand 34' | Report | Kane 18' | Stadium: Waldstadion; Attendance: 46,177; Referee: Artur Soares Dias (Portugal) |

| 25 June 2024 | England | 0–0 | Slovenia | Cologne, Germany |
| 21:00 CEST (UTC+2) | | Report | | Stadium: RheinEnergieStadion; Attendance: 41,536; Referee: Clément Turpin (France) |

====== Knockout stage ======
| 30 June 2024 Round of 16 | England | 2–1 (a.e.t.) | Slovakia | Gelsenkirchen, Germany |
| 21:00 CEST (UTC+2) | Bellingham 90+5'; Kane 91' | Report | Schranz 25' | Stadium: Arena AufSchalke; Attendance: 47,244; Referee: Halil Umut Meler (Turkey) |

| 6 July 2024 Quarter-finals | England | 1–1 (a.e.t.) (5–3 p) | Switzerland | Düsseldorf, Germany |
| 18:00 CEST (UTC+2) | Saka 80' | Report | Embolo 75' | Stadium: Merkur Spiel-Arena; Attendance: 46,907; Referee: Daniele Orsato (Italy) |
| | Penalties |
| | Palmer (penalty scored); Bellingham (penalty scored); Saka (penalty scored); Toney (penalty scored); Alexander-Arnold (penalty scored) | | (penalty missed) Akanji; (penalty scored) Schär; (penalty scored) Shaqiri; (penalty scored) Amdouni |

| 10 July 2024 Semi-finals | Netherlands | 1–2 | England | Dortmund, Germany |
| 21:00 CEST (UTC+2) | Simons 7' | Report | Kane 18' (pen.); Watkins 90' | Stadium: Westfalenstadion; Attendance: 60,926; Referee: Felix Zwayer (Germany) |

| 14 July 2024 Final | Spain | 2–1 | England | Berlin, Germany |
| 21:00 CEST (UTC+2) | Williams 47'; Oyarzabal 86' | Report | Palmer 73' | Stadium: Olympiastadion; Attendance: 65,600; Referee: François Letexier (France) |

=== U–17 ===
==== FIFA U-17 World Cup ====
===== Group C =====
| Pos | Team | Pld | W | D | L | GF | GA | GD | Pts | Qualification |
|---|---|---|---|---|---|---|---|---|---|---|
| 1 | England | 3 | 2 | 0 | 1 | 13 | 3 | +10 | 6 | Knockout stage |
| 2 | Brazil | 3 | 2 | 0 | 1 | 13 | 4 | +9 | 6 | Knockout stage |
| 3 | Iran | 3 | 2 | 0 | 1 | 9 | 4 | +5 | 6 | Knockout stage |
| 4 | New Caledonia | 3 | 0 | 0 | 3 | 0 | 24 | −24 | 0 | |

Source: FIFA

| 11 November 2023 | New Caledonia | 0–10 | England | Jakarta, Indonesia |
| | | Report | Russell-Denny 16' (pen.); Oboavwoduo 30', 57'; Dibling 35'; Acheampong 45+4'; Amo-Ameyaw 51'; Nwaneri 78'; Hanye 80' (o.g.); Murray-Campbell 85'; McAllister 90+1' | Stadium: Jakarta International Stadium; Attendance: 6,684; Referee: Ko Hyung-jin (South Korea) |

| 14 November 2023 | England | 2–1 | Iran | Jakarta, Indonesia |
| | Russell-Denny 63'; Ndala 90' | Report | Zamani 31' | Stadium: Jakarta International Stadium; Attendance: 7,698; Referee: Gustavo Tejera (Uruguay) |

| 17 November 2023 | England | 1–2 | Brazil | Jakarta, Indonesia |
| | Ndala 71' (pen.) | Report | Kauã Elias 43'; Da Mata 54' | Stadium: Jakarta International Stadium; Attendance: 15,171; Referee: Bryan López (Guatemala) |

===== Knockout stage =====
| 22 November 2023 R16 | England | 1–2 | Uzbekistan | Jakarta, Indonesia |
| | Ndala 35' | Report | Saidov 4'; Mirzaev 67' | Stadium: Jakarta International Stadium; Attendance: 7,014; Referee: Selvin Brown (Honduras) |

=== England women's national football team ===
==== Results and fixtures ====
===== Friendlies =====
| 1 July 2023 | England | 0–0 | Portugal | Milton Keynes, England |
| 15:15 | | | | Stadium: Stadium MK; Attendance: 26,227; Referee: Esther Staubli (Switzerland) |

| 23 February 2024 | England | 7–2 | Austria | Algeciras, Spain |
| 19:45 | Russo 3', 61'; Clinton 19'; Mead 37', 89'; J. Carter 70'; Daly 90+3' | | Kirchberger 30', 88' | Stadium: Estadio Nuevo Mirador; Attendance: 949; Referee: Ainara Andrea Acevedo Dudley (Spain) |

| 27 February 2024 | England | 5–1 | Italy | Algeciras, Spain |
| 19:00 | Wubben-Moy 2'; Hemp 21', 34'; Toone 69'; Daly 79' | | Cambiaghi 45+3' | Stadium: Estadio Nuevo Mirador; Attendance: 650; Referee: María Eugenia Gil Soriano (Spain) |

===== 2023 FIFA Women's World Cup =====
====== Group D ======
| Pos | Team | Pld | W | D | L | GF | GA | GD | Pts | Qualification |
|---|---|---|---|---|---|---|---|---|---|---|
| 1 | England | 3 | 3 | 0 | 0 | 8 | 1 | +7 | 9 | Advance to knockout stage |
| 2 | Denmark | 3 | 2 | 0 | 1 | 3 | 1 | +2 | 6 | Advance to knockout stage |
| 3 | China | 3 | 1 | 0 | 2 | 2 | 7 | −5 | 3 | |
| 4 | Haiti | 3 | 0 | 0 | 3 | 0 | 4 | −4 | 0 | |

Source: FIFA
Rules for classification: Group stage tiebreakers

| 22 July 2023 | England | 1–0 | Haiti | Brisbane, Australia |
| 19:30 UTC+10 | Stanway 29' (pen.) | Report | | Stadium: Lang Park; Attendance: 44,369; Referee: Emikar Calderas Barrera (Venezuela) |

| 28 July 2023 | England | 1–0 | Denmark | Sydney, Australia |
| | James 7' | Report | | Stadium: Sydney Football Stadium; Attendance: 40,439; Referee: Tess Olofsson (Sweden) |

| 1 August 2023 | China | 1–6 | England | Adelaide, Australia |
| | Wang Shuang 57' (pen.) | Report | Russo 4'; Hemp 26'; James 41', 65'; Kelly 77'; Daly 84' | Stadium: Hindmarsh Stadium; Attendance: 13,497; Referee: Casey Reibelt (Australia) |

===== Knockout stage =====
| 7 August 2023 R16 | England | 0–0 (a.e.t.) (4–2 p) | Nigeria | Brisbane, Australia |
| 17:30 UTC+10 | | Report | | Stadium: Lang Park; Attendance: 49,461; Referee: Melissa Borjas (Honduras) |
| | Penalties |
| | Stanway (penalty missed); England (penalty scored); Daly (penalty scored); Greenwood (penalty scored); Kelly (penalty scored) | | (penalty missed) Oparanozie; (penalty missed) Alozie; (penalty scored) Ajibade; (penalty scored) Ucheibe |

| 12 August 2023 QF | England | 2–1 | Colombia | Sydney, Australia |
| 20:30 UTC+10 | Hemp 45+7'; Russo 63' | Report | Santos 44' | Stadium: Stadium Australia; Attendance: 75,784; Referee: Ekaterina Koroleva (United States) |

| 16 August 2023 SF | Australia | 1–3 | England | Sydney, Australia |
| 20:00 UTC+10 | Kerr 63' | Report | Toone 36'; Hemp 71'; Russo 86' | Stadium: Stadium Australia; Attendance: 75,784; Referee: Tori Penso (United States) |

| 20 August 2023 Final | Spain | 1–0 | England | Sydney, Australia |
| 20:00 UTC+10 | Carmona 29' | Report | | Stadium: Stadium Australia; Attendance: 75,784; Referee: Tori Penso (United States) |

===== 2023–24 UEFA Women's Nations League =====
====== Group A1 ======
| Pos | Team | Pld | W | D | L | GF | GA | GD | Pts | Qualification or relegation | (Netherlands) | (England) | (Belgium) | (Scotland) |
|---|---|---|---|---|---|---|---|---|---|---|---|---|---|---|
| 1 | Netherlands | 6 | 4 | 0 | 2 | 14 | 6 | +8 | 12 (Note: Tied on head-to-head results. Ranked on overall goal difference: Netherlands +8, England +7) | Qualification for Nations League Finals | — | 2–1 | 4–0 | 4–0 |
| 2 | England | 6 | 4 | 0 | 2 | 15 | 8 | +7 | 12 | | 3–2 | — | 1–0 | 2–1 |
| 3 | Belgium (O) | 6 | 2 | 2 | 2 | 7 | 10 | −3 | 8 | Qualification for relegation play-offs | 2–1 | 3–2 | — | 1–1 |
| 4 | Scotland (R) | 6 | 0 | 2 | 4 | 3 | 15 | −12 | 2 | Relegation to League B | 0–1 | 0–6 | 1–1 | — |

Source: UEFA
Rules for classification: Tiebreakers
(O) Play-off winners; (R) Relegated
Notes:

| 22 September 2023 | England | 2–1 | Scotland | Sunderland, England |
| 19:45 | Bronze 39'; Hemp 45' | Report | Hanson 45+2' | Stadium: Stadium of Light; Attendance: 41,947; Referee: Maria Sole Caputi (Italy) |

| 26 September 2023 | Netherlands | 2–1 | England | Utrecht, Netherlands |
| 19:00 | Martens 34'; Jansen 90' | Report | Russo 64' | Stadium: Stadion Galgenwaard; Attendance: 24,000; Referee: Ivana Martinčić (Croatia) |

| 27 October 2023 | England | 1–0 | Belgium | Leicester |
| TBC | Hemp 13' | Report | | Stadium: King Power Stadium; Attendance: 28,321; Referee: Lina Lehtovaara (Finland) |

| 31 October 2023 | Belgium | 3–2 | England | Leuven |
| 20:30 | De Neve 9'; Wullaert 45+6', 85' (pen.) | Report | Bronze 38'; Kirby 44' | Stadium: Den Dreef; Attendance: 7,235; Referee: Esther Staubli (Switzerland) |

| 1 December 2023 | England | 3–2 | Netherlands | London |
| TBC | Stanway 58'; Hemp 60'; Toone 90+1' | Report | Beerensteyn 12', 35' | Stadium: Wembley Stadium; Attendance: 71,632; Referee: Tess Olofsson (Sweden) |

| 5 December 2023 | Scotland | 0–6 | England | Glasgow |
| TBC | | Report | Greenwood 12'; James 38', 39'; Mead 45+1'; Kirby 49'; Bronze 90+3' | Stadium: Hampden Park; Attendance: 15,320; Referee: Alina Peşu (Romania) |

===== UEFA Women's Euro 2025 qualifying =====
====== Group A3 ======
| Pos | Team | Pld | W | D | L | GF | GA | GD | Pts | Qualification | (France) | (England) | (Sweden) | (Republic of Ireland) |
|---|---|---|---|---|---|---|---|---|---|---|---|---|---|---|
| 1 | France | 6 | 4 | 0 | 2 | 8 | 7 | +1 | 12 | Qualify for final tournament | — | 1–2 | 2–1 | 1–0 |
| 2 | England | 6 | 3 | 2 | 1 | 8 | 5 | +3 | 11 | Qualify for final tournament | 1–2 | — | 1–1 | 2–1 |
| 3 | Sweden | 6 | 2 | 2 | 2 | 6 | 4 | +2 | 8 | Advance to play-offs (seeded) | 0–1 | 0–0 | — | 1–0 |
| 4 | Republic of Ireland (R) | 6 | 1 | 0 | 5 | 4 | 10 | −6 | 3 | Advance to play-offs (seeded) and relegation to League B | 3–1 | 0–2 | 0–3 | — |

Source: UEFA
Rules for classification: Tiebreakers
(R) Relegated

| 5 April 2024 | England | 1–1 | Sweden | London, England |
| 20:00 | Russo 24' | Report | Rolfö 64' | Stadium: Wembley Stadium; Attendance: 63,248; Referee: Ivana Projkovska (North Macedonia) |

| 9 April 2024 | Republic of Ireland | 0–2 | England | Dublin, Ireland |
| 19:30 | | Report | James 12'; Greenwood 18' (pen.) | Stadium: Aviva Stadium; Attendance: 32,742; Referee: Lina Lehtovaara (Finland) |

| 31 May 2024 | England | 1–2 | France | Newcastle, England |
| 20:00 | Mead 30' | Report | De Almeida 41'; Katoto 69' | Stadium: St James' Park; Attendance: 42,561; Referee: Marta Huerta de Aza (Spain) |

| 4 June 2024 | France | 1–2 | England | Saint-Étienne, France |
| 20:00 | Diani 72' (pen.) | Report | Stanway 22'; Russo 35' | Stadium: Stade Geoffroy-Guichard; Attendance: 10,194; Referee: Ivana Martinčić (Croatia) |

== FIFA competitions ==
=== FIFA Club World Cup ===
==== Bracket ====
First round
(Saudi Arabian Football Federation) Al-Ittihad | 3
(New Zealand Football) Auckland City | 0

Second round
(Mexican Football Federation) León | 0
(Japan Football Association) Urawa Red Diamonds | 1
(Egyptian Football Association) Al Ahly | 3
(Saudi Arabian Football Federation) Al-Ittihad | 1

Semi-finals
(Japan Football Association) Urawa Red Diamonds | 0
(The Football Association) Manchester City | 3
(Brazilian Football Confederation) Fluminense | 2
(Egyptian Football Association) Al Ahly | 0

Final
(The Football Association) Manchester City | 4
(Brazilian Football Confederation) Fluminense | 0
Match for third place
(Japan Football Association) Urawa Red Diamonds | 2
(Egyptian Football Association) Al Ahly | 4

==== Matches ====
| 19 December 2023 SF | Urawa Red Diamonds (Japan Football Association) | 0–3 | (The Football Association) Manchester City | King Abdullah Sports City, Jeddah |
| | | Report | Høibråten 45+1' (o.g.); Kovačić 52'; Silva 59' | Attendance: 40,127; Referee: Mohammed Al Hoish (Saudi Arabia) |

| 22 December 2023 Final | Manchester City (The Football Association) | 4–0 | (Brazilian Football Confederation) Fluminense | King Abdullah Sports City, Jeddah |
| 21:00 | Álvarez 1', 88'; Nino 27' (o.g.); Foden 72' | Report | | Attendance: 52,601; Referee: Szymon Marciniak (Poland) |

== UEFA competitions ==
=== UEFA Super Cup ===
16 August 2023
22:00 UTC+3

| Manchester City (The Football Association) | 1–1 | (Royal Spanish Football Federation) Sevilla |
|---|---|---|
| Palmer 63' | Report | En-Nesyri 25' |
Penalties
| Haaland (penalty scored); Álvarez (penalty scored); Kovačić (penalty scored); Grealish (penalty scored); Walker (penalty scored) | 5–4 | (penalty scored) Ocampos; (penalty scored) Mir; (penalty scored) Rakitić; (penalty scored) Montiel; (penalty missed) Gudelj |

Karaiskakis Stadium, Piraeus
Attendance: 29,207
Referee: François Letexier (France)

=== UEFA Champions League ===
==== Group stage ====
===== Group A =====
| Pos | Team | Pld | W | D | L | GF | GA | GD | Pts | Qualification | BAY | CPH | GAL | MUN |
|---|---|---|---|---|---|---|---|---|---|---|---|---|---|---|
| 1 | (Germany) Bayern Munich | 6 | 5 | 1 | 0 | 12 | 6 | +6 | 16 | Advance to knockout phase | — | 0–0 | 2–1 | 4–3 |
| 2 | (Denmark) Copenhagen | 6 | 2 | 2 | 2 | 8 | 8 | 0 | 8 | Advance to knockout phase | 1–2 | — | 1–0 | 4–3 |
| 3 | (Turkey) Galatasaray | 6 | 1 | 2 | 3 | 10 | 13 | −3 | 5 | Transfer to Europa League | 1–3 | 2–2 | — | 3–3 |
| 4 | (England) Manchester United | 6 | 1 | 1 | 4 | 12 | 15 | −3 | 4 | | 0–1 | 1–0 | 2–3 | — |

Source: UEFA

===== Group B =====
| Pos | Team | Pld | W | D | L | GF | GA | GD | Pts | Qualification | ARS | PSV | LEN | SEV |
|---|---|---|---|---|---|---|---|---|---|---|---|---|---|---|
| 1 | (England) Arsenal | 6 | 4 | 1 | 1 | 16 | 4 | +12 | 13 | Advance to knockout phase | — | 4–0 | 6–0 | 2–0 |
| 2 | (Netherlands) PSV Eindhoven | 6 | 2 | 3 | 1 | 8 | 10 | −2 | 9 | Advance to knockout phase | 1–1 | — | 1–0 | 2–2 |
| 3 | (France) Lens | 6 | 2 | 2 | 2 | 6 | 11 | −5 | 8 | Transfer to Europa League | 2–1 | 1–1 | — | 2–1 |
| 4 | (Spain) Sevilla | 6 | 0 | 2 | 4 | 7 | 12 | −5 | 2 | | 1–2 | 2–3 | 1–1 | — |

Source: UEFA

===== Group F =====
| Pos | Team | Pld | W | D | L | GF | GA | GD | Pts | Qualification | DOR | PAR | MIL | NEW |
|---|---|---|---|---|---|---|---|---|---|---|---|---|---|---|
| 1 | (Germany) Borussia Dortmund | 6 | 3 | 2 | 1 | 7 | 4 | +3 | 11 | Advance to knockout phase | — | 1–1 | 0–0 | 2–0 |
| 2 | (France) Paris Saint-Germain | 6 | 2 | 2 | 2 | 9 | 8 | +1 | 8 (Note: Tied on head-to-head points. Head-to-head goal difference: Paris Saint-Germain +2, Milan −2.) | Advance to knockout phase | 2–0 | — | 3–0 | 1–1 |
| 3 | (Italy) Milan | 6 | 2 | 2 | 2 | 5 | 8 | −3 | 8 | Transfer to Europa League | 1–3 | 2–1 | — | 0–0 |
| 4 | (England) Newcastle United | 6 | 1 | 2 | 3 | 6 | 7 | −1 | 5 | | 0–1 | 4–1 | 1–2 | — |

Source: UEFA

===== Group G =====
| Pos | Team | Pld | W | D | L | GF | GA | GD | Pts | Qualification | MCI | RBL | YB | RSB |
|---|---|---|---|---|---|---|---|---|---|---|---|---|---|---|
| 1 | (England) Manchester City | 6 | 6 | 0 | 0 | 18 | 7 | +11 | 18 | Advance to knockout phase | — | 3–2 | 3–0 | 3–1 |
| 2 | (Germany) RB Leipzig | 6 | 4 | 0 | 2 | 13 | 10 | +3 | 12 | Advance to knockout phase | 1–3 | — | 2–1 | 3–1 |
| 3 | (Switzerland) Young Boys | 6 | 1 | 1 | 4 | 7 | 13 | −6 | 4 | Transfer to Europa League | 1–3 | 1–3 | — | 2–0 |
| 4 | (Serbia) Red Star Belgrade | 6 | 0 | 1 | 5 | 7 | 15 | −8 | 1 | | 2–3 | 1–2 | 2–2 | — |

Source: UEFA

==== Knockout phase ====
===== Round of 16 =====
| Team 1 | Agg. | Team 2 | 1st leg | 2nd leg |
|---|---|---|---|---|
| Porto (Portugal) | 1–1 (2–4 p) | (England) Arsenal | 1–0 | 0–1 (a.e.t.) |
| Copenhagen (Denmark) | 2–6 | (England) Manchester City | 1–3 | 1–3 |

===== Quarter-finals =====
| Team 1 | Agg. | Team 2 | 1st leg | 2nd leg |
|---|---|---|---|---|
| Arsenal (England) | 2–3 | (Germany) Bayern Munich | 2–2 | 0–1 |
| Real Madrid (Spain) | 4–4 (4–3 p) | (England) Manchester City | 3–3 | 1–1 (a.e.t.) |

=== UEFA Europa League ===
==== Group stage ====
===== Group A =====
| Pos | Team | Pld | W | D | L | GF | GA | GD | Pts | Qualification | WHU | FRE | OLY | TSC |
|---|---|---|---|---|---|---|---|---|---|---|---|---|---|---|
| 1 | (England) West Ham United | 6 | 5 | 0 | 1 | 10 | 4 | +6 | 15 | Advance to round of 16 | — | 2–0 | 1–0 | 3–1 |
| 2 | (Germany) SC Freiburg | 6 | 4 | 0 | 2 | 17 | 7 | +10 | 12 | Advance to knockout round play-offs | 1–2 | — | 5–0 | 5–0 |
| 3 | (Greece) Olympiacos | 6 | 2 | 1 | 3 | 11 | 14 | −3 | 7 | Transfer to Europa Conference League | 2–1 | 2–3 | — | 5–2 |
| 4 | (Serbia) TSC | 6 | 0 | 1 | 5 | 6 | 19 | −13 | 1 | | 0–1 | 1–3 | 2–2 | — |

Source: UEFA

===== Group B =====
| Pos | Team | Pld | W | D | L | GF | GA | GD | Pts | Qualification | BHA | MAR | AJA | AEK |
|---|---|---|---|---|---|---|---|---|---|---|---|---|---|---|
| 1 | (England) Brighton & Hove Albion | 6 | 4 | 1 | 1 | 10 | 5 | +5 | 13 | Advance to round of 16 | — | 1–0 | 2–0 | 2–3 |
| 2 | (France) Marseille | 6 | 3 | 2 | 1 | 14 | 10 | +4 | 11 | Advance to knockout round play-offs | 2–2 | — | 4–3 | 3–1 |
| 3 | (Netherlands) Ajax | 6 | 1 | 2 | 3 | 10 | 13 | −3 | 5 | Transfer to Europa Conference League | 0–2 | 3–3 | — | 3–1 |
| 4 | (Greece) AEK Athens | 6 | 1 | 1 | 4 | 6 | 12 | −6 | 4 | | 0–1 | 0–2 | 1–1 | — |

Source: UEFA

===== Group E =====
| Pos | Team | Pld | W | D | L | GF | GA | GD | Pts | Qualification | LIV | TOU | USG | LAS |
|---|---|---|---|---|---|---|---|---|---|---|---|---|---|---|
| 1 | (England) Liverpool | 6 | 4 | 0 | 2 | 17 | 7 | +10 | 12 | Advance to round of 16 | — | 5–1 | 2–0 | 4–0 |
| 2 | (France) Toulouse | 6 | 3 | 2 | 1 | 8 | 9 | −1 | 11 | Advance to knockout round play-offs | 3–2 | — | 0–0 | 1–0 |
| 3 | (Belgium) Union Saint-Gilloise | 6 | 2 | 2 | 2 | 5 | 8 | −3 | 8 | Transfer to Europa Conference League | 2–1 | 1–1 | — | 2–1 |
| 4 | (Austria) LASK | 6 | 1 | 0 | 5 | 6 | 12 | −6 | 3 | | 1–3 | 1–2 | 3–0 | — |

Source: UEFA

==== Knockout stage ====
===== Round of 16 =====
| Team 1 | Agg. | Team 2 | 1st leg | 2nd leg |
|---|---|---|---|---|
| Sparta Prague (Czech Republic) | 2–11 | (England) Liverpool | 1–5 | 1–6 |
| Roma (Italy) | 4–1 | (England) Brighton & Hove Albion | 4–0 | 0–1 |
| SC Freiburg (Germany) | 1–5 | (England) West Ham United | 1–0 | 0–5 |

===== Quarter-finals =====
| Team 1 | Agg. | Team 2 | 1st leg | 2nd leg |
|---|---|---|---|---|
| Liverpool (England) | 1–3 | (Italy) Atalanta | 0–3 | 1–0 |
| Bayer Leverkusen (Germany) | 3–1 | (England) West Ham United | 2–0 | 1–1 |

=== UEFA Europa Conference League ===
==== Play-off round ====
| Team 1 | Agg. | Team 2 | 1st leg | 2nd leg |
|---|---|---|---|---|
| Hibernian (Scotland) | 0–8 | (England) Aston Villa | 0–5 | 0–3 |

==== Group stage ====
===== Group E =====
| Pos | Team | Pld | W | D | L | GF | GA | GD | Pts | Qualification | AVL | LEG | AZ | ZRI |
|---|---|---|---|---|---|---|---|---|---|---|---|---|---|---|
| 1 | (England) Aston Villa | 6 | 4 | 1 | 1 | 12 | 7 | +5 | 13 | Advance to round of 16 | — | 2–1 | 2–1 | 1–0 |
| 2 | (Poland) Legia Warsaw | 6 | 4 | 0 | 2 | 10 | 6 | +4 | 12 | Advance to knockout round play-offs | 3–2 | — | 2–0 | 2–0 |
| 3 | (Netherlands) AZ | 6 | 2 | 0 | 4 | 7 | 12 | −5 | 6 | | 1–4 | 1–0 | — | 1–0 |
| 4 | (Bosnia and Herzegovina) Zrinjski Mostar | 6 | 1 | 1 | 4 | 6 | 10 | −4 | 4 | | 1–1 | 1–2 | 4–3 | — |

Source: UEFA

==== Knockout phase ====
===== Round of 16 =====
| Team 1 | Agg. | Team 2 | 1st leg | 2nd leg |
|---|---|---|---|---|
| Ajax (Netherlands) | 0–4 | (England) Aston Villa | 0–0 | 0–4 |

===== Quarter-finals =====
| Team 1 | Agg. | Team 2 | 1st leg | 2nd leg |
|---|---|---|---|---|
| Aston Villa (England) | 3–3 (4–3 p) | (France) Lille | 2–1 | 1–2 (a.e.t.) |

===== Semi-finals =====
| Team 1 | Agg. | Team 2 | 1st leg | 2nd leg |
|---|---|---|---|---|
| Aston Villa (England) | 2–6 | (Greece) Olympiacos | 2–4 | 0–2 |

=== UEFA Women's Champions League ===
==== Qualifying rounds ====
===== Round 1 =====
Semi-finals

| Team 1 | Score | Team 2 |
|---|---|---|
| Arsenal (England) | 3–0 | (Sweden) Linköping |

Final

| Team 1 | Score | Team 2 |
|---|---|---|
| Arsenal (England) | 3–3 (a.e.t.) (2–4 p) | (France) Paris FC |

===== Round 2 =====
| Team 1 | Agg. | Team 2 | 1st leg | 2nd leg |
|---|---|---|---|---|
| Manchester United (England) | 2–4 | (France) Paris Saint-Germain | 1–1 | 1–3 |

==== Group stage ====
===== Group D =====
| Pos | Team | Pld | W | D | L | GF | GA | GD | Pts | Qualification | CHE | HAC | PFC | RMA |
|---|---|---|---|---|---|---|---|---|---|---|---|---|---|---|
| 1 | (England) Chelsea | 6 | 4 | 2 | 0 | 15 | 5 | +10 | 14 | Advance to quarter-finals | — | 0–0 | 4–1 | 2–1 |
| 2 | (Sweden) BK Häcken | 6 | 3 | 2 | 1 | 6 | 5 | +1 | 11 | Advance to quarter-finals | 1–3 | — | 0–0 | 2–1 |
| 3 | (France) Paris FC | 6 | 2 | 1 | 3 | 5 | 11 | −6 | 7 | | 0–4 | 1–2 | — | 2–1 |
| 4 | (Spain) Real Madrid | 6 | 0 | 1 | 5 | 5 | 10 | −5 | 1 | | 2–2 | 0–1 | 0–1 | — |

Source: UEFA
Rules for classification: Group stage tiebreakers

==== Knockout phase ====
===== Quarter-finals =====
| Team 1 | Agg. | Team 2 | 1st leg | 2nd leg |
|---|---|---|---|---|
| Ajax (Netherlands) | 1–4 | (England) Chelsea | 0–3 | 1–1 |

===== Semi-finals =====
| Team 1 | Agg. | Team 2 | 1st leg | 2nd leg |
|---|---|---|---|---|
| Barcelona (Spain) | 2–1 | (England) Chelsea | 0–1 | 2–0 |

=== UEFA Youth League ===
==== UEFA Champions League Path ====
===== Group stage =====
====== Group A ======
| Pos | Team | Pld | W | D | L | GF | GA | GD | Pts | Qualification | CPH | BAY | GAL | MUN |
|---|---|---|---|---|---|---|---|---|---|---|---|---|---|---|
| 1 | (Danish Football Association) Copenhagen | 6 | 4 | 1 | 1 | 18 | 7 | +11 | 13 | Round of 16 | — | 3–2 | 6–0 | 2–2 |
| 2 | (German Football Association) Bayern Munich | 6 | 4 | 0 | 2 | 11 | 7 | +4 | 12 | Play-offs | 2–1 | — | 2–1 | 2–0 |
| 3 | (Turkish Football Federation) Galatasaray | 6 | 2 | 0 | 4 | 5 | 17 | −12 | 6 | | 1–5 | 2–1 | — | 1–0 |
| 4 | (The Football Association) Manchester United | 6 | 1 | 1 | 4 | 5 | 8 | −3 | 4 | | 0–1 | 0–2 | 3–0 | — |

Source: UEFA

====== Group B ======
| Pos | Team | Pld | W | D | L | GF | GA | GD | Pts | Qualification | LEN | SEV | PSV | ARS |
|---|---|---|---|---|---|---|---|---|---|---|---|---|---|---|
| 1 | (French Football Federation) Lens | 6 | 4 | 1 | 1 | 7 | 4 | +3 | 13 | Round of 16 | — | 1–1 | 2–1 | 1–0 |
| 2 | (Royal Spanish Football Federation) Sevilla | 6 | 2 | 3 | 1 | 6 | 5 | +1 | 9 | Play-offs | 0–1 | — | 1–0 | 2–1 |
| 3 | (Royal Dutch Football Association) PSV Eindhoven | 6 | 2 | 1 | 3 | 7 | 8 | −1 | 7 | | 2–0 | 1–1 | — | 1–3 |
| 4 | (The Football Association) Arsenal | 6 | 1 | 1 | 4 | 6 | 9 | −3 | 4 | | 0–2 | 1–1 | 1–2 | — |

Source: UEFA

====== Group F ======
| Pos | Team | Pld | W | D | L | GF | GA | GD | Pts | Qualification | MIL | DOR | NEW | PAR |
|---|---|---|---|---|---|---|---|---|---|---|---|---|---|---|
| 1 | (Italian Football Federation) Milan | 6 | 4 | 0 | 2 | 14 | 8 | +6 | 12 | Round of 16 | — | 4–1 | 4–0 | 3–2 |
| 2 | (German Football Association) Borussia Dortmund | 6 | 3 | 1 | 2 | 9 | 9 | 0 | 10 | Play-offs | 1–2 | — | 2–2 | 2–0 |
| 3 | (The Football Association) Newcastle United | 6 | 2 | 1 | 3 | 8 | 11 | −3 | 7 | | 3–1 | 1–2 | — | 0–1 |
| 4 | (French Football Federation) Paris Saint-Germain | 6 | 2 | 0 | 4 | 5 | 8 | −3 | 6 | | 1–0 | 0–1 | 1–2 | — |

Source: UEFA

====== Group G ======
| Pos | Team | Pld | W | D | L | GF | GA | GD | Pts | Qualification | MCI | RBL | RSB | YB |
|---|---|---|---|---|---|---|---|---|---|---|---|---|---|---|
| 1 | (The Football Association) Manchester City | 6 | 4 | 2 | 0 | 17 | 6 | +11 | 14 | Round of 16 | — | 2–1 | 5–2 | 3–0 |
| 2 | (German Football Association) RB Leipzig | 6 | 3 | 2 | 1 | 8 | 5 | +3 | 11 | Play-offs | 1–1 | — | 2–1 | 0–0 |
| 3 | (Football Association of Serbia) Red Star Belgrade | 6 | 1 | 1 | 4 | 8 | 13 | −5 | 4 (Note: Tied on head-to head record.) | | 2–2 | 0–1 | — | 2–1 |
| 4 | (Swiss Football Association) Young Boys | 6 | 1 | 1 | 4 | 4 | 13 | −9 | 4 | | 0–4 | 1–3 | 2–1 | — |

Source: UEFA

==== Knockout phase ====
===== Round of 16 =====
| Team 1 | Score | Team 2 |
|---|---|---|
| Mainz 05 (Germany) | 2–1 | (England) Manchester City |

== Men's football ==
| League Division | Promoted to league ▲ | Relegated from league ▼ |
|---|---|---|
| Premier League | Burnley ▲; Sheffield United ▲; Luton Town ▲ | Leicester City ▼; Leeds United ▼; Southampton ▼ |
| Championship | Plymouth Argyle ▲; Ipswich Town ▲; Sheffield Wednesday ▲ | Reading ▼; Blackpool ▼; Wigan Athletic ▼ |
| League One | Leyton Orient ▲; Stevenage ▲; Northampton Town ▲; Carlisle United ▲ | Milton Keynes Dons ▼; Morecambe ▼; Accrington Stanley ▼; Forest Green Rovers ▼ |
| League Two | Wrexham ▲; Notts County ▲ | Hartlepool United ▼; Rochdale ▼ |
| National League | AFC Fylde ▲; Kidderminster Harriers ▲; Ebbsfleet United ▲; Oxford City ▲ | Torquay United ▼; Yeovil Town ▼; Scunthorpe United ▼; Maidstone United ▼ |

=== Premier League ===
In what was a three-horse race for nearly the entire campaign, Manchester City became the first English side to win four straight titles – Pep Guardiola's side overcoming a rough run of form before Christmas to once again hold off challenges from Arsenal and Liverpool (despite only taking top spot in the penultimate week having topped the table for almost the whole of the start of the season to the November international break), finishing with both 91 points and their first unbeaten league season at the Etihad for 12 years as well as securing victory in the UEFA Super Cup and the Club World Cup. Arsenal finished in 2nd place for the second successive season, but unlike last year, the Gunners this time took the battle for the title to the last day (despite spending less time at the top), helped in no small part by an extraordinary run of form in 2024, even going the season unbeaten against City and Liverpool, only slip-ups during the Christmas period proving costly to the North London side who also reached the Champions League quarter-finals for the first time since 2010, only being knocked out by a narrow defeat to Bayern Munich. In what turned out to be Jürgen Klopp's final season, Liverpool remained in the top three for virtually the entire campaign and even led the table for nearly the entire winter whilst being in contention for an unprecedented quadruple until a collapse in form in the spring saw them exit both the Europa League and the FA Cup, whilst a succession of dropped points in the league enabled City and Arsenal to overtake, nonetheless securing a third placed finish and improving on the previous season, while also winning the League Cup for the second time in three seasons. Unai Emery's first full season in charge of Aston Villa was deemed a success as the Villans qualified for Europe's top competition for the first time since 1983, as well as reaching the Conference League semi-finals - perhaps the only disappointment being early exits in both domestic cup competitions.

Tottenham Hotspur's first season without star striker Harry Kane and under Australian head coach Ange Postecoglou proved to be turbulent; despite a good start, finishing October top of the table and unbeaten after ten games, an injury crisis and indifferent form across the rest of the campaign took their toll on the North London club, though finishing fifth place and securing a return to European football. Chelsea languished in mid-table for most of the campaign as they suffered from greatly inconsistent form, despite reaching the final of the League Cup, but the Blues went on a resurgence from mid-February that propelled them up the table, helped by the free goal-scoring efforts of summer signing Cole Palmer, who finished as the division's second-highest scorer with 22 goals, to secure a sixth-place finish and a return to European football; their season, however, was tempered by former Tottenham manager Mauricio Pochettino's sudden departure after just one year in charge shortly after the last game. An extensive injury crisis saw Newcastle United's campaign fizzle out early on, with early exits in both their domestic competitions and the Champions League – with only a decent resurgence in form from the end of January ensuring a seventh-place finish (and because of Manchester United's FA Cup win it was not enough to secure what would have been European football in successive seasons for the first time since 2006). Manchester United endured a very disappointing season, suffering early exits in the Champions League and Carabao Cup, on top of poor league form not being helped by an extensive injury crisis as the Red Devils finished with a negative goal difference and suffered their lowest league finish, 8th, in 34 years, all combining to put pressure on manager Erik ten Hag; the season, however, ended on a bright note as the club won its 13th FA Cup, overcoming league champions and crosstown rivals Manchester City in the final (and thus securing European football for the following season).

In contrast to their unexpected qualifying for the Europa League last season, Brighton and Hove Albion's season rapidly faded out as the Seagulls won just seven games after September to miss out on the top ten (also failing to keep a clean sheet until the New Year); their very first European campaign saw them reach the last 16 of the Europa League, bowing out with a heavy first-leg loss to Roma, with head coach Roberto De Zerbi announcing his departure after the season's end. West Ham United were another team that saw their season fizzle out; whilst they remained in the top-seven battle for much longer, a collapse in form in the New Year saw the Hammers slip out of the race and capped a disappointing end to what was manager David Moyes' final season in charge, which also included a run to the Europa League quarter-finals. A run of form that saw only three wins between October and April saw Crystal Palace once more sucked into the relegation fight, the Eagles seeing manager Roy Hodgson resign in mid-February following a health scare amid reports of a potential sacking and being replaced by Oliver Glasner; the London club recovered remarkably, embarking on a great late resurgence - which included thumping victories over Manchester United and Aston Villa among others - to equal their highest Premier League finish of 10th. The shock pre-season decision by Bournemouth to sack head coach Gary O'Neil in favour of Spaniard Andoni Iraola ended up proving to be an inspired choice, only terrible form at both ends of the season and a lengthy winless run after Christmas preventing the Cherries from a potential race for European qualification, their highlights including a first ever away win at Manchester United.

For only the second time in Premier League history, and first since 1998, all three promoted sides were relegated straight back to the Championship, in a relegation battle impacted by points deductions for financial irregularities; Sheffield United secured one of the lowest points total for a newly-promoted side whilst breaking the unwanted records held by both Swindon Town and Derby County for goals conceded in a top-flight season (Swindon having conceded 100 goals in 42 games and Derby 89 goals in 38 games), their cause not being helped by the sacking of manager Paul Heckingbottom in early December who was then replaced by former manager Chris Wilder and finishing with 104 goals conceded. Burnley finished above them, also enduring a disappointing return to the top-flight, the Clarets, and manager Vincent Kompany, earning praise for their continued attacking tactics but completely failing to transfer these tactics into results, their two biggest wins coming against The Blades. In spite of a remarkable goal-scoring record (the best for a play-off winning side since Blackpool) and some impressive results, including taking four points off both Newcastle and Everton, Luton Town filled the last relegation place in their first top-flight season since 1992, the Hatters' failure to turn their goals into results, as well as a terrible defensive record, going against them. In spite of enduring points deductions twice, having a total of eight points deducted, Everton managed to secure safety with several weeks to go - despite a lengthy winless run extending from Christmas to early April, the Toffees went on a late run of 17 points from the last nine games to extend their 70-year stay in the top-flight. Brentford endured a tough season as injuries to key players and a lengthy ban for star striker Ivan Toney received in the penultimate week of the previous season plunged the Bees into the relegation mire, only a couple of late wins helping them scrape to safety. Nottingham Forest were also involved in the relegation battle for nearly the entire season, with manager Steve Cooper being sacked in mid-December and replaced by Nuno Espirito Santo, the club's position worsening from a four-point deduction imposed in March, but still the Reds secured their top-flight stay for another season while also finishing the campaign with 32 points, the lowest total to secure top-flight safety - breaking the record set by West Bromwich Albion in 2005.

| Pos | Team | Pld | W | D | L | GF | GA | GD | Pts | Qualification or relegation |
|---|---|---|---|---|---|---|---|---|---|---|
| 1 | Manchester City (C) | 38 | 28 | 7 | 3 | 96 | 34 | +62 | 91 | Qualification for the Champions League league phase |
| 2 | Arsenal | 38 | 28 | 5 | 5 | 91 | 29 | +62 | 89 | Qualification for the Champions League league phase |
| 3 | Liverpool | 38 | 24 | 10 | 4 | 86 | 41 | +45 | 82 | Qualification for the Champions League league phase |
| 4 | Aston Villa | 38 | 20 | 8 | 10 | 76 | 61 | +15 | 68 | Qualification for the Champions League league phase |
| 5 | Tottenham Hotspur | 38 | 20 | 6 | 12 | 74 | 61 | +13 | 66 | Qualification for the Europa League league phase |
| 6 | Chelsea | 38 | 18 | 9 | 11 | 77 | 63 | +14 | 63 | Qualification for the Conference League play-off round (Note: Since the winners of the 2023–24 EFL Cup, Liverpool, qualified for the Champions League, the spot given to the League Cup winners (Conference League play-off round) was passed to the sixth-placed team.) |
| 7 | Newcastle United | 38 | 18 | 6 | 14 | 85 | 62 | +23 | 60 | |
| 8 | Manchester United | 38 | 18 | 6 | 14 | 57 | 58 | −1 | 60 | Qualification for the Europa League league phase (Note: Manchester United qualified for the Europa League league phase as the 2023–24 FA Cup winners.) |
| 9 | West Ham United | 38 | 14 | 10 | 14 | 60 | 74 | −14 | 52 | |
| 10 | Crystal Palace | 38 | 13 | 10 | 15 | 57 | 58 | −1 | 49 | |
| 11 | Brighton & Hove Albion | 38 | 12 | 12 | 14 | 55 | 62 | −7 | 48 | |
| 12 | Bournemouth | 38 | 13 | 9 | 16 | 54 | 67 | −13 | 48 | |
| 13 | Fulham | 38 | 13 | 8 | 17 | 55 | 61 | −6 | 47 | |
| 14 | Wolverhampton Wanderers | 38 | 13 | 7 | 18 | 50 | 65 | −15 | 46 | |
| 15 | Everton | 38 | 13 | 9 | 16 | 40 | 51 | −11 | 40 (Note: Everton were deducted eight points for breaching profitability and sustainability rules. They were originally deducted ten points but this was reduced to six after an appeal. The club were then deducted an additional two points for further PSR breaches.) | |
| 16 | Brentford | 38 | 10 | 9 | 19 | 56 | 65 | −9 | 39 | |
| 17 | Nottingham Forest | 38 | 9 | 9 | 20 | 49 | 67 | −18 | 32 (Note: Nottingham Forest were deducted four points for breaching profitability and sustainability rules. The club appealed the decision but were unsuccessful.) | |
| 18 | Luton Town (R) | 38 | 6 | 8 | 24 | 52 | 85 | −33 | 26 | Relegation to EFL Championship |
| 19 | Burnley (R) | 38 | 5 | 9 | 24 | 41 | 78 | −37 | 24 | Relegation to EFL Championship |
| 20 | Sheffield United (R) | 38 | 3 | 7 | 28 | 35 | 104 | −69 | 16 | Relegation to EFL Championship |

Source: Premier League
Rules for classification: 1) Points; 2) Goal difference; 3) Goals scored; 4) If the champions, relegated teams or qualified teams for UEFA competitions cannot be determined by rules 1 to 3, rules 4.1 to 4.3 are applied – 4.1) Points gained in head-to-head record between such teams; 4.2) Away goals scored in head-to-head record between such teams; 4.3) Play-offs
(C) Champions; (R) Relegated

=== Championship ===
In a remarkable Championship campaign, with vital table positions left open heading into the last matchday, Leicester City secured an immediate return to the Premier League as champions; the Foxes had looked uncatchable up until February, when a bad run of form allowed the teams behind to close the gap - and despite the title race becoming a three-horse one for much of the spring, Enzo Maresca's side recovered impressively in the closing weeks to comfortably win the second tier title for a record eighth time. Ipswich Town remarkably finished 2nd, amassing 96 points, a record for a second-placed team; the Tractor Boys remained in the top six for the entire campaign, against all odds, occupying 2nd place for virtually the entire first half of the season and even overcoming poor runs of form either sides of January and in April, to end their 22-year exile from the Premier League in style and become only the fifth side to win successive promotions from the third tier to the top flight, an achievement that earned coach Kieran McKenna and his side universal praise. The play-off final ended up being between the other relegated sides in Leeds United and Southampton, with Southampton ultimately winning out to earn head coach Russell Martin promotion in his first season at the club, the Saints overcoming a bad start to embark on a club record unbeaten run and only falling away from the top two by virtue of indifferent form in the closing months.

Leeds United overcame a slow start to the campaign, a spectacular run of form in 2024 propelling them into the automatic promotion race, but a familiar end-of-the-season slump saw the Whites finish 3rd despite amassing 90 points, a tally that would have seen automatic promotion in almost every other season; their play-off final defeat continued their run of not having won a competitive final of any description since the 1972 FA Cup final. Both Middlesbrough and Coventry City failed to emulate last season's success of reaching the play-offs, as they finished 8th and 9th respectively, Boro's hopes of another play-off finish dented by a failure to win their first seven games, whereas the Sky Blues never looked like mounting a serious play-off challenge, not helped by a terrible end to their season either, although both clubs made up for it with impressive cup runs, Middlesbrough reaching the Carabao Cup semi-finals and even beating Chelsea in the first leg before suffering a heavy second leg defeat, whilst Coventry reached the FA Cup semi-finals, forcing extra time against Manchester United despite falling 3–0 behind and only losing on penalties, in a match where they even had a 120-minute goal marginally ruled out for offside. On the other hand, Sunderland fared worse than these two despite starting the season quite well until hiring Michael Beale from Rangers. At the time of the appointment, they looked to be challenging for a second successive top 6 finish but results started to collapse and later sacking him, replacing him with Mike Dodds. The black cats eventually came from play off push in March to barely avoiding a second relegation in six years and finishing 16th, only surviving by just six points, a season failure.

Plymouth Argyle's first season at this level in 13 years was troublesome, the club remaining all season long in the bottom half of the table but having no real fear of relegation until their form worsened following the departure of promotion-winning manager Steven Schumacher to Stoke City, dragging the Pilgrims into the relegation battle in the New Year, ultimately staying up thanks to a last-matchday victory. Sheffield Wednesday completed their own "Great Escape"; the club spent all but four matchdays in the bottom three, beginning the season with just three points from 13 games, until the hiring of 34-year-old German Danny Röhl - the youngest manager in the Football League - provided an uplift in the Owls' fortunes, with several runs of good form - including a run of 14 points from their last six games, ensuring a second successive season in the second tier. Queens Park Rangers also spent a large part of the season looking likely for relegation, at some point even being several points from safety, but the hiring of Spaniard Martí Cifuentes provided the club with enough spark to gradually climb its way out of the bottom three, whilst Blackburn Rovers overcame a bad run of form that saw the Lancashire club secure just five wins after November to avoid a second relegation to League One in seven years, with top scorer Sammie Szmodics finishing as the division's top goalscorer and almost single-handedly pulling his team over the line.

In a dramatic relegation battle, with several sides in the mix up until the closing weeks, Rotherham United became the first side in the Football League to suffer relegation, in a season where they had four managers and failed to win a single away game (the Millers securing just nine away wins in their last five Championship seasons), returning to League One after a two-year spell; the only bright spot was an upturn in form after the return of successful former manager Steve Evans late in the season, which at least prevented them from equalling their own record for the lowest-ever second tier points total. The other two relegation positions were decided on the last matchday; Huddersfield Town became the second team to be relegated, the Terriers' emphatic downward spiral since the departure of influential manager Carlos Corberán after losing in the play-off final two years ago taking its toll, in a turbulent season where they changed managers twice and returned to the third tier after 12 years away, having played in the Premier League as recently as 2019. Making even bigger headlines were Birmingham City, the Blues enduring their first relegation to the third tier since 1995 – the Midlands club had actually made a bright start, only for the controversial sacking of head coach John Eustace in favour of Wayne Rooney to prove a farcical decision, the club falling to barely above the drop zone on New Year's Day; in the end, another four managers would be appointed before the end of April (with Rooney's replacement in Tony Mowbray lasting just eight games before a medical leave of absence) but even the return of former manager Gary Rowett failed to stop the Blues' slide into the drop zone in spite of a final-day victory.

| Pos | Team | Pld | W | D | L | GF | GA | GD | Pts | Promotion, qualification or relegation |
|---|---|---|---|---|---|---|---|---|---|---|
| 1 | Leicester City (C, P) | 46 | 31 | 4 | 11 | 89 | 41 | +48 | 97 | Promoted to the Premier League |
| 2 | Ipswich Town (P) | 46 | 28 | 12 | 6 | 92 | 57 | +35 | 96 | Promoted to the Premier League |
| 3 | Leeds United | 46 | 27 | 9 | 10 | 81 | 43 | +38 | 90 | Qualified for the Championship play-offs |
| 4 | Southampton (O, P) | 46 | 26 | 9 | 11 | 87 | 63 | +24 | 87 | Qualified for the Championship play-offs |
| 5 | West Bromwich Albion | 46 | 21 | 12 | 13 | 70 | 47 | +23 | 75 | Qualified for the Championship play-offs |
| 6 | Norwich City | 46 | 21 | 10 | 15 | 79 | 64 | +15 | 73 | Qualified for the Championship play-offs |
| 7 | Hull City | 46 | 19 | 13 | 14 | 68 | 60 | +8 | 70 | |
| 8 | Middlesbrough | 46 | 20 | 9 | 17 | 71 | 62 | +9 | 69 | |
| 9 | Coventry City | 46 | 17 | 13 | 16 | 70 | 59 | +11 | 64 | |
| 10 | Preston North End | 46 | 18 | 9 | 19 | 56 | 67 | −11 | 63 | |
| 11 | Bristol City | 46 | 17 | 11 | 18 | 53 | 51 | +2 | 62 | |
| 12 | Cardiff City | 46 | 19 | 5 | 22 | 53 | 70 | −17 | 62 | |
| 13 | Millwall | 46 | 16 | 11 | 19 | 45 | 55 | −10 | 59 | |
| 14 | Swansea City | 46 | 15 | 12 | 19 | 59 | 65 | −6 | 57 | |
| 15 | Watford | 46 | 13 | 17 | 16 | 61 | 61 | 0 | 56 | |
| 16 | Sunderland | 46 | 16 | 8 | 22 | 52 | 54 | −2 | 56 | |
| 17 | Stoke City | 46 | 15 | 11 | 20 | 49 | 60 | −11 | 56 | |
| 18 | Queens Park Rangers | 46 | 15 | 11 | 20 | 47 | 58 | −11 | 56 | |
| 19 | Blackburn Rovers | 46 | 14 | 11 | 21 | 60 | 74 | −14 | 53 | |
| 20 | Sheffield Wednesday | 46 | 15 | 8 | 23 | 44 | 68 | −24 | 53 | |
| 21 | Plymouth Argyle | 46 | 13 | 12 | 21 | 59 | 70 | −11 | 51 | |
| 22 | Birmingham City (R) | 46 | 13 | 11 | 22 | 50 | 65 | −15 | 50 | Relegated to EFL League One |
| 23 | Huddersfield Town (R) | 46 | 9 | 18 | 19 | 48 | 77 | −29 | 45 | Relegated to EFL League One |
| 24 | Rotherham United (R) | 46 | 5 | 12 | 29 | 37 | 89 | −52 | 27 | Relegated to EFL League One |

Source: EFL official website
Rules for classification: 1) Points; 2) Goal difference; 3) Number of goals scored; 4) Head-to-head results; 5) Wins; 6) Away goals; 7) Penalty points (sec 9.5); 8) Number of 12-point sending off offences; 9) Play-off (only if needed to determine promotion/relegation)
(C) Champions; (O) Play-off winners; (P) Promoted; (R) Relegated

=== League One ===
In John Mousinho's first full season at the helm, Portsmouth won the League One title, topping the table for virtually the entire season and ending their 12-year exile from the Championship in style, only a somewhat poor run of form during and after Christmas preventing Pompey from breaking the 100-point mark - as the club finally secured its first promotion under American owner Michael Eisner. In a tense race, Derby County finished second, overcoming a slow start to rocket up the table after November and returning to the Championship after two seasons in the third tier, winning their first promotion since 2007 in the process and earning manager Paul Warne his fourth promotion as a manager in seven years - narrowly edging out Bolton Wanderers, who then narrowly missed out in the play-offs, losing the final to Oxford United; the U's enjoyed a remarkable season, staying in the promotion chase from the beginning and even overcoming both the loss of manager Liam Manning to Bristol City and a rough run of form in the New Year to edge back into the top six on the last day, before winning at Wembley and ending a 25-year absence from the second tier.

Blackpool failed to mount a substantial play-off challenge, a late rally proving too little too late in manager Neil Critchley's first season back in charge as indifferent form for the entire campaign ultimately took its toll on the Seasiders. The other two sides relegated from the Championship, Wigan and Reading, had their seasons marred by financial difficulties and points deductions; especially Reading, who even looked likely for a second successive relegation for nearly the entire season, only pulling away from the bottom four in the spring, amid increasing fan protests against owner Dai Yongge, which culminated in a pitch invasion that led to a match over Port Vale in January being abandoned. Charlton Athletic, who competed in the Championship four years ago, endured a turbulent season, going through five different managers, a long winless run mid-season dragging the Addicks into the relegation mire; the appointment of former Luton and Southampton manager Nathan Jones provided the club with enough spark to avoid a potential relegation battle - as they went on a long unbeaten run - but 16th place was still the lowest in the club's history since the pre-World War II years. The three automatically promoted sides had quite good seasons back in the third tier; Leyton Orient managed an 11th place finish, never being threatened with relegation and even looking likely to sneak into the play-offs during late winter, in their first season back at this level in eight years. Stevenage, in their first season in League One since 2014, occupied a play-off position for the bulk of the season, only missing out by a poor run of form after February, while Northampton Town, back after two years in the bottom tier, spent the entire season in mid-table and finished in 14th place - their highest in the Football League in 16 years.

Carlisle United never got back to grips with life in League One, in their first season at this tier for ten years, and were relegated in last place, sealing an immediate return to League Two - with even a couple of late wins coming too late for the Cumbrians. Port Vale suffered a complete collapse in form after briefly reaching second place in mid-September, winning just five games after that point and suffering relegation after two years in this tier, despite the appointment of experienced manager Darren Moore. Despite changing three managers, Fleetwood Town never looked likely to escape relegation as they fell in the bottom four after the fourth game and never left it, returning to League Two after ten years and suffering the very first relegation as the current incarnation of the club. The battle to avoid the final relegation spot proved very tight; in the end, Cheltenham took the last spot, never managing to fully recover from a terrible start that saw them fail to score in any of their first eleven games, and thus bringing the Robins' three-year spell in the division to an end, albeit managing to avoid finishing with the worst goals scored record for the campaign. Burton Albion and Cambridge United both came perilously close to relegation in the last few matchdays, but both clubs managed to just pull themselves over the line, to secure their status for the next season.

| Pos | Team | Pld | W | D | L | GF | GA | GD | Pts | Promotion, qualification or relegation |
|---|---|---|---|---|---|---|---|---|---|---|
| 1 | Portsmouth (C, P) | 46 | 28 | 13 | 5 | 78 | 41 | +37 | 97 | Promotion to EFL Championship |
| 2 | Derby County (P) | 46 | 28 | 8 | 10 | 78 | 37 | +41 | 92 | Promotion to EFL Championship |
| 3 | Bolton Wanderers | 46 | 25 | 12 | 9 | 86 | 51 | +35 | 87 | Qualification for League One play-offs |
| 4 | Peterborough United | 46 | 25 | 9 | 12 | 89 | 61 | +28 | 84 | Qualification for League One play-offs |
| 5 | Oxford United (O, P) | 46 | 22 | 11 | 13 | 79 | 56 | +23 | 77 | Qualification for League One play-offs |
| 6 | Barnsley | 46 | 21 | 13 | 12 | 82 | 64 | +18 | 76 | Qualification for League One play-offs |
| 7 | Lincoln City | 46 | 20 | 14 | 12 | 65 | 40 | +25 | 74 | |
| 8 | Blackpool | 46 | 21 | 10 | 15 | 65 | 48 | +17 | 73 | |
| 9 | Stevenage | 46 | 19 | 14 | 13 | 57 | 46 | +11 | 71 | |
| 10 | Wycombe Wanderers | 46 | 17 | 14 | 15 | 60 | 55 | +5 | 65 | |
| 11 | Leyton Orient | 46 | 18 | 11 | 17 | 53 | 55 | −2 | 65 | |
| 12 | Wigan Athletic | 46 | 20 | 10 | 16 | 63 | 56 | +7 | 62 (Note: On 19 May 2023, Wigan Athletic were deducted four points for failing to pay players and staff on time following previous EFL rules breaches in the 2022–23 season. Another four-point deduction was applied on 26 May, after the club's owners missed a deadline to deposit an amount equalling 125% of its monthly wage bill.) | |
| 13 | Exeter City | 46 | 17 | 10 | 19 | 46 | 61 | −15 | 61 | |
| 14 | Northampton Town | 46 | 17 | 9 | 20 | 57 | 66 | −9 | 60 | |
| 15 | Bristol Rovers | 46 | 16 | 9 | 21 | 52 | 68 | −16 | 57 | |
| 16 | Charlton Athletic | 46 | 11 | 20 | 15 | 64 | 65 | −1 | 53 | |
| 17 | Reading | 46 | 16 | 11 | 19 | 68 | 70 | −2 | 53 (Note: On 16 August 2023, Reading were deducted one point for failing to pay players on time and in full on three occasions in the 2022–23 season. Another 3-point deduction was applied on 13 September, for failing to deposit wages on time. Another 2-point deduction was applied on 27 February, due to late HMRC payments.) | |
| 18 | Cambridge United | 46 | 12 | 12 | 22 | 39 | 61 | −22 | 48 | |
| 19 | Shrewsbury Town | 46 | 13 | 9 | 24 | 35 | 67 | −32 | 48 | |
| 20 | Burton Albion | 46 | 12 | 10 | 24 | 39 | 67 | −28 | 46 | |
| 21 | Cheltenham Town (R) | 46 | 12 | 8 | 26 | 41 | 65 | −24 | 44 | Relegation to EFL League Two |
| 22 | Fleetwood Town (R) | 46 | 10 | 13 | 23 | 49 | 72 | −23 | 43 | Relegation to EFL League Two |
| 23 | Port Vale (R) | 46 | 10 | 11 | 25 | 41 | 74 | −33 | 41 | Relegation to EFL League Two |
| 24 | Carlisle United (R) | 46 | 7 | 9 | 30 | 41 | 81 | −40 | 30 | Relegation to EFL League Two |

Source: EFL Official Website
Rules for classification: 1) Points; 2) Goal difference; 3) Number of goals scored; 4) Head-to-head results; 5) Wins; 6) Away goals; 7) Penalty points (sec 9.5); 8) 12-point sending off offences
(C) Champions; (O) Play-off winners; (P) Promoted; (R) Relegated

=== League Two ===
In what proved to be quite a one-sided promotion race, with all top three teams securing their place with three matchdays to go, Stockport County bounced back from their play-off final loss last year and secured the League Two title, putting a slow start behind them to return to League One after 14 years and give manager Dave Challinor his second promotion in three years. Wrexham's meteoric rise continued, as the club's long-awaited return to the Football League ended with the Welsh side securing their second straight promotion and a place in the third tier for the first time in 19 years, the Red Dragons solidifying themselves in the top seven in early October and gradually surging up the table, perhaps only missing out on another title because of their inferior away record and a slow start. Mansfield Town finished 3rd; the Stags remained in the top seven for virtually the entire season and even looked likely to snatch the title from Stockport, missing out by a couple of losses in March and April - their season was nonetheless rendered an immense success, the club returning to the third tier after 21 years away. Qualifying for the play-off final were Crewe Alexandra and Crawley Town, both of whom only managed to secure their play-off places on the final day but defied expectations in the semi-finals; ultimately emerging victorious were Crawley Town, the Red Devils winning on their first ever visit to Wembley to end a nine-year exile from League One and cap a triumphant first full season in charge for manager Scott Lindsey, just one season after the club had barely escaped relegation from the Football League.

Having begun their season with a run of just two points in seven games and looking like battling relegation all season long, Doncaster Rovers ended their campaign with a spectacular last-season surge - including a ten-game winning streak - to secure a fifth-place finish before losing out on penalties to Crewe Alexandra. Barrow enjoyed their best season since returning to the Football League, remaining in the top seven for most of the season, but a terrible run of just two points from seven games in April, coupled with Doncaster's late meteoric rise, meant they failed to reach the play-offs, a consequence of drawing their last game. Notts County, in their first season back in the Football League after four years, began on a very bright note as they mounted a serious play-off challenge; the Magpies' form tailed off badly in the New Year, however, after promotion-winning manager Luke Williams departed for Swansea in early January, and the club finished in 14th, in a season awash with 175 goals, translated into an attacking record only bettered by Stockport and Mansfield, but a defensive one worse even than the two relegated sides. Harrogate Town enjoyed their best season to date with a 13th place finish, even reaching a playoff position as late as the end of February - however, only three wins from Valentine's Day onward caused them to falter down the stretch.

Just two years after winning promotion to the third tier, Forest Green Rovers finished bottom and suffered a second consecutive relegation, falling back into non-league football after seven years, amid a dreadful season that saw several managerial changes, including the sacking of player-manager Troy Deeney in the aftermath of a post-match rant about the mentality of the squad. The battle for the last relegation place went to the final day, with Sutton United sliding back into non-league football after three years amid a rough campaign, the London side's hopes being let down by a number of draws in winnable games including a 4–4 draw on the final day of the season. Colchester United flirted with relegation on several occasions throughout the season but managed to just pull themselves over the line following a late improvement in form, securing their survival on the final matchday.

| Pos | Team | Pld | W | D | L | GF | GA | GD | Pts | Promotion, qualification or relegation |
|---|---|---|---|---|---|---|---|---|---|---|
| 1 | Stockport County (C, P) | 46 | 27 | 11 | 8 | 96 | 48 | +48 | 92 | Promoted to EFL League One |
| 2 | Wrexham (P) | 46 | 26 | 10 | 10 | 89 | 52 | +37 | 88 | Promoted to EFL League One |
| 3 | Mansfield Town (P) | 46 | 24 | 14 | 8 | 90 | 47 | +43 | 86 | Promoted to EFL League One |
| 4 | Milton Keynes Dons | 46 | 23 | 9 | 14 | 83 | 68 | +15 | 78 | Qualified for League Two play-offs |
| 5 | Doncaster Rovers | 46 | 21 | 8 | 17 | 73 | 68 | +5 | 71 | Qualified for League Two play-offs |
| 6 | Crewe Alexandra | 46 | 19 | 14 | 13 | 69 | 65 | +4 | 71 | Qualified for League Two play-offs |
| 7 | Crawley Town (O, P) | 46 | 21 | 7 | 18 | 73 | 67 | +6 | 70 | Qualified for League Two play-offs |
| 8 | Barrow | 46 | 18 | 15 | 13 | 62 | 56 | +6 | 69 | |
| 9 | Bradford City | 46 | 19 | 12 | 15 | 61 | 59 | +2 | 69 | |
| 10 | AFC Wimbledon | 46 | 17 | 14 | 15 | 64 | 51 | +13 | 65 | |
| 11 | Walsall | 46 | 18 | 11 | 17 | 69 | 73 | −4 | 65 | |
| 12 | Gillingham | 46 | 18 | 10 | 18 | 46 | 57 | −11 | 64 | |
| 13 | Harrogate Town | 46 | 17 | 12 | 17 | 60 | 69 | −9 | 63 | |
| 14 | Notts County | 46 | 18 | 7 | 21 | 89 | 86 | +3 | 61 | |
| 15 | Morecambe | 46 | 17 | 10 | 19 | 67 | 81 | −14 | 58 (Note: On 11 April 2024, Morecambe were deducted three points for failing to pay players and staff on time following previous EFL rules breaches in the 2023–24 season.) | |
| 16 | Tranmere Rovers | 46 | 17 | 6 | 23 | 67 | 70 | −3 | 57 | |
| 17 | Accrington Stanley | 46 | 16 | 9 | 21 | 63 | 71 | −8 | 57 | |
| 18 | Newport County | 46 | 16 | 7 | 23 | 62 | 76 | −14 | 55 | |
| 19 | Swindon Town | 46 | 14 | 12 | 20 | 77 | 83 | −6 | 54 | |
| 20 | Salford City | 46 | 13 | 12 | 21 | 66 | 82 | −16 | 51 | |
| 21 | Grimsby Town | 46 | 11 | 16 | 19 | 57 | 74 | −17 | 49 | |
| 22 | Colchester United | 46 | 11 | 12 | 23 | 59 | 80 | −21 | 45 | |
| 23 | Sutton United (R) | 46 | 9 | 15 | 22 | 59 | 84 | −25 | 42 | Relegated to National League |
| 24 | Forest Green Rovers (R) | 46 | 11 | 9 | 26 | 44 | 78 | −34 | 42 | Relegated to National League |

Source: EFL Official Website
Rules for classification: 1) Points; 2) Goal difference; 3) Number of goals scored; 4) Head-to-head results; 5) Wins; 6) Away goals; 7) Penalty points (sec 9.5); 8) 12-point sending off offences
(C) Champions; (O) Play-off winners; (P) Promoted; (R) Relegated

=== National League ===
In one of the most one-sided title races in the fifth tier, Chesterfield ended their six-year absence from the Football League in some style, giving manager Paul Cook his second promotion with the club exactly a decade after his first, with perhaps the only disappointment in the campaign being their poor defensive record (worse than relegated Kidderminster Harriers) and a poor run of form after winning the title to stop them breaking the goal and points records set by Wrexham and Notts County the previous season. The play-off final ended up being between Bromley and Solihull Moors, a fantastic achievement for both clubs considering neither had played in the Football League - in the end, the final came down to penalties for the second year in a row, with Bromley coming out on top, securing Ravens manager Andy Woodman his first managerial promotion and ensuring a second success in two years at Wembley for the club, having won the FA Trophy final in 2022 against Wrexham.

Despite finishing sixth in the table, a remarkable achievement considering the departure of their manager only a few months into the season, Gateshead were excluded from the play-offs due to ground ownership issues, the first time any team had been excluded from the fifth tier's promotion processes since Stevenage were denied automatic promotion for similar reasons in 1996. Southend United endured a turbulent season on and off the pitch, facing the threat of liquidation in the early months of the season before finally gaining new ownership - on the pitch, their campaign would have seen them qualify for the play-offs if not for a ten-point deduction imposed for financial irregularities. Hartlepool United and Rochdale, both relegated from the Football League the previous season, ultimately endured disappointing seasons; whilst both finished in the top half of the table, neither looked like coming close to securing an immediate return to League Two, the latter facing financial uncertainty off the pitch on top of poor league results.

Oxford City's first-ever season at this level resulted in immediate relegation, largely in part due to a poor second half of the season that saw them fall to the bottom of the table. Dorking Wanderers were relegated after two seasons, also being let down by underwhelming form in the New Year as a failure to get any wins from their final eleven fixtures proved fatal. Kidderminster Harriers' first season at this level in eight years proved to be disappointing, a terrible first half of the season ultimately proving too much to overcome, though the team did surprise by finishing with a better defensive record than Chesterfield. Boreham Wood occupied the final relegation spot, bringing an end to nine years at this level, and going down with the highest-ever points total for a side relegated from the fifth tier, just one season after narrowly missing out on the play-off final.

| Pos | Team | Pld | W | D | L | GF | GA | GD | Pts | Promotion, qualification or relegation |
|---|---|---|---|---|---|---|---|---|---|---|
| 1 | Chesterfield (C, P) | 46 | 31 | 5 | 10 | 106 | 65 | +41 | 98 | Promotion to EFL League Two |
| 2 | Barnet | 46 | 26 | 8 | 12 | 91 | 60 | +31 | 86 | Qualification for the National League play-off semi-finals |
| 3 | Bromley (O, P) | 46 | 22 | 15 | 9 | 73 | 49 | +24 | 81 | Qualification for the National League play-off semi-finals |
| 4 | Altrincham | 46 | 22 | 11 | 13 | 84 | 59 | +25 | 77 (Note: While Altrincham originally qualified for the play-off quarter-finals, Gateshead's exclusion meant that Altrincham were awarded a walkover win and progressed directly the semi-finals.) | Qualification for the National League play-off semi-finals |
| 5 | Solihull Moors | 46 | 21 | 13 | 12 | 71 | 62 | +9 | 76 | Qualification for the National League play-off quarter-finals |
| 6 | Gateshead | 46 | 22 | 9 | 15 | 88 | 64 | +24 | 75 | (Note: Gateshead were excluded from the play-offs due to not meeting the Football League's ground ownership requirements.) |
| 7 | FC Halifax Town | 46 | 19 | 14 | 13 | 58 | 50 | +8 | 71 | Qualification for the National League play-off quarter-finals |
| 8 | Aldershot Town | 46 | 20 | 9 | 17 | 74 | 83 | −9 | 69 | |
| 9 | Southend United | 46 | 21 | 12 | 13 | 70 | 45 | +25 | 65 (Note: Southend United were deducted ten points for failing to pay debt to HMRC.) | |
| 10 | Oldham Athletic | 46 | 15 | 18 | 13 | 63 | 60 | +3 | 63 | |
| 11 | Rochdale | 46 | 16 | 14 | 16 | 69 | 64 | +5 | 62 | |
| 12 | Hartlepool United | 46 | 17 | 9 | 20 | 70 | 82 | −12 | 60 | |
| 13 | Eastleigh | 46 | 16 | 11 | 19 | 73 | 87 | −14 | 59 | |
| 14 | Maidenhead United | 46 | 15 | 13 | 18 | 60 | 67 | −7 | 58 | |
| 15 | Dagenham & Redbridge | 46 | 14 | 14 | 18 | 69 | 63 | +6 | 56 | |
| 16 | Wealdstone | 46 | 15 | 11 | 20 | 60 | 72 | −12 | 56 | |
| 17 | Woking | 46 | 15 | 10 | 21 | 49 | 55 | −6 | 55 | |
| 18 | AFC Fylde | 46 | 15 | 10 | 21 | 74 | 82 | −8 | 55 | |
| 19 | Ebbsfleet United | 46 | 14 | 12 | 20 | 59 | 74 | −15 | 54 | |
| 20 | York City | 46 | 12 | 17 | 17 | 55 | 69 | −14 | 53 | |
| 21 | Boreham Wood (R) | 46 | 12 | 16 | 18 | 59 | 73 | −14 | 52 | Relegation to National League South |
| 22 | Kidderminster Harriers (R) | 46 | 11 | 13 | 22 | 40 | 59 | −19 | 46 | Relegation to National League North |
| 23 | Dorking Wanderers (R) | 46 | 12 | 9 | 25 | 54 | 85 | −31 | 45 | Relegation to National League South |
| 24 | Oxford City (R) | 46 | 8 | 9 | 29 | 54 | 94 | −40 | 33 | Relegation to National League North |

Source: National League official site
Rules for classification: 1) Points; 2) Goal difference; 3) Number of goals scored; 4) Number of matches won; 5) Head-to-head results
(C) Champions; (O) Play-off winners; (P) Promoted; (R) Relegated

==== North ====
| Pos | Team | Pld | W | D | L | GF | GA | GD | Pts | Promotion, qualification or relegation |
|---|---|---|---|---|---|---|---|---|---|---|
| 1 | Tamworth (C, P) | 46 | 29 | 9 | 8 | 74 | 29 | +45 | 96 | Promotion to National League |
| 2 | Scunthorpe United | 46 | 26 | 10 | 10 | 84 | 38 | +46 | 88 | Qualification for the National League North play-off semi-finals |
| 3 | Brackley Town | 46 | 25 | 10 | 11 | 65 | 37 | +28 | 85 | Qualification for the National League North play-off semi-finals |
| 4 | Chorley | 46 | 25 | 8 | 13 | 81 | 50 | +31 | 83 | Qualification for the National League North play-off quarter-finals |
| 5 | Alfreton Town | 46 | 23 | 11 | 12 | 76 | 50 | +26 | 80 | Qualification for the National League North play-off quarter-finals |
| 6 | Boston United (O, P) | 46 | 21 | 12 | 13 | 68 | 46 | +22 | 75 | Qualification for the National League North play-off quarter-finals |
| 7 | Curzon Ashton | 46 | 21 | 12 | 13 | 62 | 49 | +13 | 75 | Qualification for the National League North play-off quarter-finals |
| 8 | South Shields | 46 | 22 | 8 | 16 | 79 | 53 | +26 | 74 | |
| 9 | Spennymoor Town | 46 | 22 | 8 | 16 | 74 | 62 | +12 | 74 | |
| 10 | Chester | 46 | 18 | 15 | 13 | 58 | 37 | +21 | 69 | |
| 11 | Hereford | 46 | 20 | 9 | 17 | 62 | 66 | −4 | 69 | |
| 12 | Warrington Town | 46 | 17 | 13 | 16 | 64 | 60 | +4 | 64 | |
| 13 | Scarborough Athletic | 46 | 18 | 10 | 18 | 53 | 55 | −2 | 64 | |
| 14 | Buxton | 46 | 17 | 11 | 18 | 70 | 63 | +7 | 62 | |
| 15 | Peterborough Sports | 46 | 16 | 10 | 20 | 55 | 65 | −10 | 58 | |
| 16 | Darlington | 46 | 16 | 8 | 22 | 52 | 72 | −20 | 56 | |
| 17 | Southport | 46 | 16 | 8 | 22 | 54 | 75 | −21 | 56 | |
| 18 | King's Lynn Town | 46 | 13 | 16 | 17 | 54 | 66 | −12 | 55 | |
| 19 | Rushall Olympic | 46 | 15 | 9 | 22 | 61 | 73 | −12 | 54 | |
| 20 | Farsley Celtic | 46 | 13 | 14 | 19 | 40 | 59 | −19 | 53 | |
| 21 | Blyth Spartans (R) | 46 | 13 | 11 | 22 | 66 | 82 | −16 | 50 | Relegation to the Northern Premier League Premier Division |
| 22 | Banbury United (R) | 46 | 10 | 8 | 28 | 38 | 86 | −48 | 38 | Relegation to the Southern League Premier Division Central |
| 23 | Gloucester City (R) | 46 | 9 | 9 | 28 | 49 | 89 | −40 | 36 | Relegation to the Southern League Premier Division South |
| 24 | Bishop's Stortford (R) | 46 | 6 | 3 | 37 | 35 | 112 | −77 | 21 | Relegation to the Southern League Premier Division Central |

Source: National League official site
Rules for classification: 1) Points; 2) Goal difference; 3) Number of goals scored; 4) Number of matches won; 5) Head-to-head results
(C) Champions; (O) Play-off winners; (P) Promoted; (R) Relegated

==== South ====
| Pos | Team | Pld | W | D | L | GF | GA | GD | Pts | Promotion, qualification or relegation |
|---|---|---|---|---|---|---|---|---|---|---|
| 1 | Yeovil Town (C, P) | 46 | 29 | 8 | 9 | 81 | 45 | +36 | 95 | Promotion to National League |
| 2 | Chelmsford City | 46 | 24 | 12 | 10 | 76 | 43 | +33 | 84 | Qualification for the National League South play-off semi-finals |
| 3 | Worthing | 46 | 26 | 6 | 14 | 104 | 72 | +32 | 84 | Qualification for the National League South play-off semi-finals |
| 4 | Maidstone United | 46 | 24 | 11 | 11 | 72 | 52 | +20 | 83 | Qualification for the National League South play-off quarter-finals |
| 5 | Braintree Town (O, P) | 46 | 23 | 12 | 11 | 64 | 42 | +22 | 81 | Qualification for the National League South play-off quarter-finals |
| 6 | Bath City | 46 | 20 | 13 | 13 | 69 | 51 | +18 | 73 | Qualification for the National League South play-off quarter-finals |
| 7 | Aveley | 46 | 21 | 10 | 15 | 68 | 61 | +7 | 73 | Qualification for the National League South play-off quarter-finals |
| 8 | Farnborough | 46 | 20 | 12 | 14 | 76 | 67 | +9 | 72 | |
| 9 | Hampton & Richmond Borough | 46 | 20 | 12 | 14 | 61 | 57 | +4 | 72 | |
| 10 | Slough Town | 46 | 18 | 14 | 14 | 81 | 69 | +12 | 68 | |
| 11 | St Albans City | 46 | 20 | 8 | 18 | 77 | 67 | +10 | 68 | |
| 12 | Chippenham Town | 46 | 16 | 14 | 16 | 62 | 62 | 0 | 62 | |
| 13 | Weston-super-Mare | 46 | 17 | 8 | 21 | 66 | 74 | −8 | 59 | |
| 14 | Tonbridge Angels | 46 | 15 | 13 | 18 | 65 | 66 | −1 | 58 | |
| 15 | Weymouth | 46 | 13 | 17 | 16 | 57 | 64 | −7 | 56 | |
| 16 | Truro City | 46 | 15 | 10 | 21 | 58 | 67 | −9 | 55 | |
| 17 | Welling United | 46 | 12 | 18 | 16 | 56 | 71 | −15 | 54 | |
| 18 | Torquay United | 46 | 19 | 7 | 20 | 73 | 76 | −3 | 53 (Note: On 13 March 2024, Torquay United were deducted ten points after the club submitted its intention to appoint administrators. Another one-point deduction was applied on 12 April, for fielding a suspended player.) | |
| 19 | Eastbourne Borough | 46 | 14 | 10 | 22 | 53 | 74 | −21 | 52 | |
| 20 | Hemel Hempstead Town | 46 | 13 | 11 | 22 | 55 | 71 | −16 | 50 | |
| 21 | Dartford (R) | 46 | 12 | 10 | 24 | 56 | 75 | −19 | 46 | Relegation to the Isthmian League Premier Division |
| 22 | Taunton Town (R) | 46 | 10 | 16 | 20 | 44 | 71 | −27 | 46 | Relegation to the Southern League Premier Division South |
| 23 | Havant & Waterlooville (R) | 46 | 10 | 7 | 29 | 52 | 92 | −40 | 37 | Relegation to the Southern League Premier Division South |
| 24 | Dover Athletic (R) | 46 | 4 | 15 | 27 | 40 | 77 | −37 | 27 | Relegation to the Isthmian League Premier Division |

Source: National League official site
Rules for classification: 1) Points; 2) Goal difference; 3) Number of goals scored; 4) Number of matches won; 5) Head-to-head results
(C) Champions; (O) Play-off winners; (P) Promoted; (R) Relegated

=== League play-offs ===
==== Football League play-offs ====
===== EFL Championship =====
====== Final ======
26 May 2024
15:00 BST

| Leeds United | 0–1 | Southampton |
|---|---|---|
| | Report | A. Armstrong 24' |

Wembley Stadium, London
Attendance: 85,862
Referee: John Brooks

===== EFL League One =====
====== Final ======
18 May 2024
16:15 BST

| Bolton Wanderers | 0–2 | Oxford United |
|---|---|---|
| | Report | Murphy 31', 42' |

Wembley Stadium, London
Attendance: 70,472
Referee: Sam Barrott

===== EFL League Two =====
====== Final ======
19 May 2024
13:00 BST

| Crawley Town | 2–0 | Crewe Alexandra |
|---|---|---|
| Orsi 41'; L. Kelly 85' | Report |

Wembley Stadium, London
Attendance: 33,341
Referee: Ben Toner (Lancashire)

==== National League play-offs ====
===== National League =====
====== Final ======
5 May 2024
15:00 BST

| Bromley | 2–2 (a.e.t.) | Solihull Moors |
|---|---|---|
| Cheek 41', 58' (pen.) | Report | Sbarra 48'; Osborne 65' |
Penalties
| Cheek (penalty scored); Charles (penalty missed); Olomola (penalty scored); Arthurs (penalty scored); Webster (penalty scored) | 4–3 | (penalty missed) Shade; (penalty missed) Labadie; (penalty scored) Campbell; (penalty scored) Boateng; (penalty scored) Benton |

Wembley Stadium, London
Attendance: 23,374
Referee: James Durkin

=== Cup competitions ===
==== FA Cup ====
===== Final =====
25 May 2024
15:00 BST

| Manchester City | 1–2 | Manchester United |
|---|---|---|
| Doku 87' | Report | Garnacho 30'; Mainoo 39' |

Wembley Stadium, London
Attendance: 84,814
Referee: Andrew Madley (West Yorkshire)

==== EFL Cup ====
===== Final =====
25 February 2024
15:00 GMT

| Chelsea | 0–1 (a.e.t.) | Liverpool |
|---|---|---|
| | Report | Van Dijk 118' |

Wembley Stadium, London
Attendance: 88,868
Referee: Chris Kavanagh

==== Community Shield ====
6 August 2023
16:00 BST

| Arsenal | 1–1 | Manchester City |
|---|---|---|
| Trossard 90+11' | Report | Palmer 77' |
Penalties
| Ødegaard (penalty scored); Trossard (penalty scored); Saka (penalty scored); Vieira (penalty scored) | 4–1 | (penalty missed) De Bruyne; (penalty scored) Silva; (penalty missed) Rodri |

Wembley Stadium, London
Attendance: 81,145
Referee: Stuart Attwell (Birmingham)

==== EFL Trophy ====
===== Final =====
7 April 2024
16:30 BST

| Peterborough United | 2–1 | Wycombe Wanderers |
|---|---|---|
| Burrows 85', 90+1' | Report | Taylor 89' |

Wembley Stadium, London
Attendance: 42,252
Referee: Scott Oldham

==== FA Trophy ====
===== Final =====
11 May 2024
16:15

| Gateshead(5) | 2–2 (a.e.t.) | Solihull Moors(5) |
|---|---|---|
| Booty 45+3'; Brown 110' | Report | Beck 69', 101' (pen.) |
Penalties
| Booty (penalty missed); Dinanga (penalty scored); Francis (penalty missed); Olley (penalty scored); Storey (penalty scored); Evans (penalty scored); Allan (penalty missed); Brown (penalty scored) | 5–4 | (penalty scored) Warburton; (penalty missed) Shade; (penalty missed) Clarke; (penalty scored) Beck; (penalty scored) Newton; (penalty scored) Mafuta; (penalty missed) Labadie; (penalty missed) Whitmore |

Wembley Stadium
Attendance: 19,964
Referee: Sam Allison

== Women's football ==
=== Women's Super League ===
| Pos | Team | Pld | W | D | L | GF | GA | GD | Pts | Qualification or relegation |
|---|---|---|---|---|---|---|---|---|---|---|
| 1 | Chelsea (C) | 22 | 18 | 1 | 3 | 71 | 18 | +53 | 55 | Qualification for the Champions League group stage |
| 2 | Manchester City | 22 | 18 | 1 | 3 | 61 | 15 | +46 | 55 | Qualification for the Champions League second round |
| 3 | Arsenal | 22 | 16 | 2 | 4 | 53 | 20 | +33 | 50 | Qualification for the Champions League first round |
| 4 | Liverpool | 22 | 12 | 5 | 5 | 36 | 28 | +8 | 41 | |
| 5 | Manchester United | 22 | 10 | 5 | 7 | 42 | 32 | +10 | 35 | |
| 6 | Tottenham Hotspur | 22 | 8 | 7 | 7 | 31 | 36 | −5 | 31 | |
| 7 | Aston Villa | 22 | 7 | 3 | 12 | 27 | 43 | −16 | 24 | |
| 8 | Everton | 22 | 6 | 5 | 11 | 24 | 37 | −13 | 23 | |
| 9 | Brighton & Hove Albion | 22 | 5 | 4 | 13 | 26 | 48 | −22 | 19 | |
| 10 | Leicester City | 22 | 4 | 6 | 12 | 26 | 45 | −19 | 18 | |
| 11 | West Ham United | 22 | 3 | 6 | 13 | 20 | 45 | −25 | 15 | |
| 12 | Bristol City (R) | 22 | 1 | 3 | 18 | 20 | 70 | −50 | 6 | Relegation to the Championship |

Source: Women's Super League Table
Rules for classification: 1) Points; 2) Goal difference; 3) Number of goals scored.
(C) Champions; (R) Relegated

=== Women's Championship ===
| Pos | Team | Pld | W | D | L | GF | GA | GD | Pts | Qualification |
|---|---|---|---|---|---|---|---|---|---|---|
| 1 | Crystal Palace (C, P) | 22 | 14 | 4 | 4 | 55 | 20 | +35 | 46 | Promotion to the WSL (Note: Dependent on obtaining a licence.) |
| 2 | Charlton Athletic | 22 | 13 | 6 | 3 | 32 | 17 | +15 | 45 | |
| 3 | Sunderland | 22 | 12 | 5 | 5 | 31 | 18 | +13 | 41 | |
| 4 | Southampton | 22 | 13 | 0 | 9 | 39 | 25 | +14 | 39 | |
| 5 | Birmingham City | 22 | 11 | 3 | 8 | 33 | 19 | +14 | 36 | |
| 6 | Blackburn Rovers | 22 | 11 | 3 | 8 | 25 | 28 | −3 | 36 | |
| 7 | Sheffield United | 22 | 9 | 2 | 11 | 32 | 31 | +1 | 29 | |
| 8 | London City Lionesses | 22 | 7 | 4 | 11 | 26 | 36 | −10 | 25 | |
| 9 | Durham | 22 | 6 | 5 | 11 | 24 | 44 | −20 | 23 | |
| 10 | Reading | 22 | 5 | 7 | 10 | 20 | 40 | −20 | 22 | |
| 11 | Lewes (R) | 22 | 4 | 4 | 14 | 22 | 39 | −17 | 16 | Relegation to the Southern Premier Division |
| 12 | Watford (R) | 22 | 4 | 3 | 15 | 22 | 44 | −22 | 15 | Relegation to the Southern Premier Division |

Rules for classification: 1) Points; 2) Goal difference; 3) Number of goals scored
(C) Champions; (P) Promoted; (R) Relegated

=== Women's National League ===
==== Northern Premier Division ====
| Pos | Team | Pld | W | D | L | GF | GA | GD | Pts | Qualification |
|---|---|---|---|---|---|---|---|---|---|---|
| 1 | Newcastle United (C, P) | 22 | 19 | 2 | 1 | 79 | 11 | +68 | 59 | Promotion to the Championship |
| 2 | Burnley | 22 | 15 | 3 | 4 | 54 | 21 | +33 | 48 | |
| 3 | Nottingham Forest | 22 | 15 | 2 | 5 | 59 | 21 | +38 | 47 | |
| 4 | Wolverhampton Wanderers | 22 | 14 | 2 | 6 | 58 | 24 | +34 | 44 | |
| 5 | Stoke City | 22 | 10 | 4 | 8 | 41 | 37 | +4 | 34 | |
| 6 | Halifax | 22 | 8 | 7 | 7 | 34 | 39 | −5 | 31 | |
| 7 | Derby County | 22 | 9 | 2 | 11 | 41 | 34 | +7 | 29 | |
| 8 | Liverpool Feds | 22 | 7 | 6 | 9 | 35 | 48 | −13 | 27 | |
| 9 | West Bromwich Albion | 22 | 8 | 2 | 12 | 29 | 42 | −13 | 26 | |
| 10 | Stourbridge | 22 | 4 | 4 | 14 | 29 | 75 | −46 | 16 | |
| 11 | Huddersfield Town (R) | 22 | 2 | 3 | 17 | 20 | 65 | −45 | 9 | Relegation to the Division One North |
| 12 | AFC Fylde (R) | 22 | 1 | 3 | 18 | 19 | 81 | −62 | 6 | Relegation to the Division One North |

Updated to match(es) played on 5 May 2024. Source:
Rules for classification: 1) Points; 2) Goal difference; 3) Number of goals scored
(C) Champions; (P) Promoted; (R) Relegated

==== Southern Premier Division ====
| Pos | Team | Pld | W | D | L | GF | GA | GD | Pts | Qualification |
|---|---|---|---|---|---|---|---|---|---|---|
| 1 | Portsmouth (C, P) | 22 | 20 | 1 | 1 | 86 | 10 | +76 | 61 | Promotion to the Championship |
| 2 | Hashtag United | 22 | 17 | 1 | 4 | 43 | 18 | +25 | 52 | |
| 3 | Rugby Borough | 22 | 16 | 0 | 6 | 54 | 29 | +25 | 48 | |
| 4 | Ipswich Town | 22 | 14 | 2 | 6 | 64 | 24 | +40 | 44 | |
| 5 | Oxford United | 22 | 14 | 2 | 6 | 47 | 27 | +20 | 44 | |
| 6 | Milton Keynes Dons | 22 | 10 | 5 | 7 | 35 | 29 | +6 | 35 | |
| 7 | Cheltenham Town | 22 | 7 | 3 | 12 | 35 | 52 | −17 | 24 | |
| 8 | Cardiff City Ladies | 22 | 6 | 4 | 12 | 30 | 47 | −17 | 22 | |
| 9 | Plymouth Argyle | 22 | 6 | 3 | 13 | 35 | 65 | −30 | 21 | |
| 10 | Billericay Town | 22 | 4 | 6 | 12 | 37 | 49 | −12 | 18 | |
| 11 | Chatham Town (R) | 22 | 0 | 6 | 16 | 15 | 64 | −49 | 6 | Relegation to the Division One South East |
| 12 | London Bees (R) | 22 | 0 | 3 | 19 | 17 | 84 | −67 | 3 | Relegation to the Division One South East |

Updated to match(es) played on 5 May 2024. Source:
Rules for classification: 1) Points; 2) Goal difference; 3) Number of goals scored
(C) Champions; (P) Promoted; (R) Relegated

==== Division One North ====
| Pos | Team | Pld | W | D | L | GF | GA | GD | Pts | Qualification |
|---|---|---|---|---|---|---|---|---|---|---|
| 1 | Hull City (C, P) | 22 | 17 | 2 | 3 | 63 | 24 | +39 | 53 | Promotion to the Northern Premier Division |
| 2 | Middlesbrough | 22 | 13 | 7 | 2 | 45 | 21 | +24 | 46 | |
| 3 | Durham Cestria | 22 | 13 | 4 | 5 | 41 | 16 | +25 | 43 | |
| 4 | Barnsley | 22 | 13 | 4 | 5 | 50 | 27 | +23 | 43 | |
| 5 | Stockport County | 22 | 9 | 8 | 5 | 33 | 22 | +11 | 35 | |
| 6 | Leeds United | 22 | 10 | 4 | 8 | 46 | 40 | +6 | 34 | |
| 7 | Doncaster Rovers Belles | 22 | 9 | 4 | 9 | 42 | 41 | +1 | 31 | |
| 8 | Chorley | 22 | 7 | 4 | 11 | 33 | 48 | −15 | 25 | |
| 9 | Norton & Stockton Ancients | 22 | 5 | 6 | 11 | 26 | 39 | −13 | 21 | |
| 10 | York City | 22 | 4 | 5 | 13 | 31 | 44 | −13 | 17 | |
| 11 | Chester-le-Street Town (R) | 22 | 4 | 2 | 16 | 27 | 55 | −28 | 14 | Relegation from the National League |
| 12 | F.C. United of Manchester (R) | 22 | 2 | 2 | 18 | 20 | 80 | −60 | 8 | Relegation from the National League |

Updated to match(es) played on 5 May 2024. Source:
Rules for classification: 1) Points; 2) Goal difference; 3) Number of goals scored
(C) Champions; (P) Promoted; (R) Relegated

==== Division One Midlands ====
| Pos | Team | Pld | W | D | L | GF | GA | GD | Pts | Qualification |
|---|---|---|---|---|---|---|---|---|---|---|
| 1 | Sporting Khalsa (C, P) | 22 | 17 | 2 | 3 | 80 | 23 | +57 | 53 | Promotion to the Northern Premier Division |
| 2 | Loughborough Lightning | 22 | 16 | 5 | 1 | 59 | 21 | +38 | 53 | |
| 3 | Peterborough United | 22 | 15 | 2 | 5 | 63 | 37 | +26 | 47 | |
| 4 | Boldmere St. Michaels | 22 | 14 | 2 | 6 | 39 | 26 | +13 | 44 | |
| 5 | Northampton Town | 22 | 12 | 2 | 8 | 53 | 33 | +20 | 38 | |
| 6 | Solihull Moors | 22 | 8 | 3 | 11 | 34 | 42 | −8 | 27 | |
| 7 | Sutton Coldfield Town | 22 | 7 | 4 | 11 | 35 | 38 | −3 | 25 | |
| 8 | Lincoln City | 22 | 5 | 7 | 10 | 41 | 50 | −9 | 22 | |
| 9 | Leafield Athletic | 22 | 4 | 6 | 12 | 25 | 50 | −25 | 18 | |
| 10 | Notts County | 22 | 4 | 4 | 14 | 25 | 76 | −51 | 16 | |
| 11 | Sheffield (R) | 22 | 3 | 6 | 13 | 15 | 41 | −26 | 15 | Relegation from the National League |
| 12 | Leek Town (R) | 22 | 3 | 5 | 14 | 25 | 57 | −32 | 14 | Relegation from the National League |

Updated to match(es) played on 9 May 2024. Source:
Rules for classification: 1) Points; 2) Goal difference; 3) Number of goals scored
(C) Champions; (P) Promoted; (R) Relegated

==== Division One South East ====
| Pos | Team | Pld | W | D | L | GF | GA | GD | Pts | Qualification |
|---|---|---|---|---|---|---|---|---|---|---|
| 1 | AFC Wimbledon (C, P) | 22 | 18 | 2 | 2 | 90 | 29 | +61 | 56 | Promotion to the Southern Premier Division |
| 2 | Norwich City | 22 | 14 | 7 | 1 | 66 | 24 | +42 | 49 | |
| 3 | Worthing | 22 | 13 | 6 | 3 | 48 | 25 | +23 | 45 | |
| 4 | Ashford Town | 22 | 10 | 6 | 6 | 54 | 44 | +10 | 36 | |
| 5 | Queens Park Rangers | 22 | 10 | 6 | 6 | 54 | 47 | +7 | 36 | |
| 6 | Actonians | 22 | 10 | 4 | 8 | 50 | 45 | +5 | 34 | |
| 7 | Cambridge United | 22 | 8 | 7 | 7 | 43 | 45 | −2 | 31 | |
| 8 | London Seaward | 22 | 7 | 8 | 7 | 42 | 37 | +5 | 29 | |
| 9 | Chesham United | 22 | 5 | 4 | 13 | 46 | 77 | −31 | 19 | |
| 10 | AFC Sudbury | 22 | 4 | 5 | 13 | 40 | 67 | −27 | 17 | |
| 11 | Cambridge City (R) | 22 | 2 | 3 | 17 | 25 | 71 | −46 | 9 | Relegation from the National League |
| 12 | Haywards Heath Town (R) | 22 | 1 | 2 | 19 | 19 | 66 | −47 | 5 | Relegation from the National League |

Updated to match(es) played on 5 May 2024. Source:
Rules for classification: 1) Points; 2) Goal difference; 3) Number of goals scored
(C) Champions; (P) Promoted; (R) Relegated

=== Women's FA Cup ===
==== Final ====
12 May 2024
14:30 BST

| Manchester United | 4–0 | Tottenham Hotspur |
|---|---|---|
| Toone 45+3'; Williams 54'; García 57', 74' | Report |

Wembley Stadium, London
Attendance: 76,082
Referee: Abigail Byrne (Cambridgeshire)

=== FA Women's League Cup ===
==== Final ====
31 March 2024
15:00 GMT

| Arsenal (1) | 1–0 (a.e.t.) | Chelsea (1) |
|---|---|---|
| Blackstenius 116' | Report |

Molineux Stadium, Wolverhampton
Attendance: 21,462
Referee: Cheryl Foster

== Managerial changes ==
This is a list of changes of managers within English league football:

| Team | Outgoing manager | Manner of departure | Date of departure | Position in table | Incoming manager | Date of appointment |
|---|---|---|---|---|---|---|
| Watford | (England) Chris Wilder | End of contract | 8 May 2023 | Pre-season | (France) Valérien Ismaël | 10 May 2023 |
| Blackpool | (Scotland) Stephen Dobbie | End of interim spell | 8 May 2023 | Pre-season | (England) Neil Critchley | 23 May 2023 |
| Reading | (Republic of Ireland) Noel Hunt | End of interim spell | 8 May 2023 | Pre-season | (Spain) Rubén Sellés | 26 June 2023 |
| Swindon Town | (England) Steve Mildenhall (Republic of Ireland) Gavin Gunning | End of interim spell | 8 May 2023 | Pre-season | (Wales) Michael Flynn | 8 May 2023 |
| Doncaster Rovers | (England) Danny Schofield | Sacked | 9 May 2023 | Pre-season | (Northern Ireland) Grant McCann | 12 May 2023 |
| Milton Keynes Dons | (England) Mark Jackson | Sacked | 9 May 2023 | Pre-season | (Scotland) Graham Alexander | 27 May 2023 |
| Cardiff City | (France) Sabri Lamouchi | End of contract | 16 May 2023 | Pre-season | (Turkey) Erol Bulut | 3 June 2023 |
| Tottenham Hotspur | (England) Ryan Mason | End of interim spell | 28 May 2023 | Pre-season | (Australia) Ange Postecoglou | 6 June 2023 |
| Chelsea | (England) Frank Lampard | End of interim spell | 28 May 2023 | Pre-season | (Argentina) Mauricio Pochettino | 29 May 2023 |
| Southampton | (Spain) Rubén Sellés | End of contract | 28 May 2023 | Pre-season | (Scotland) Russell Martin | 21 June 2023 |
| Leicester City | (England) Dean Smith | End of contract | 28 May 2023 | Pre-season | (Italy) Enzo Maresca | 16 June 2023 |
| Leeds United | (England) Sam Allardyce | Mutual consent | 2 June 2023 | Pre-season | (Germany) Daniel Farke | 4 July 2023 |
| Shrewsbury Town | (England) Steve Cotterill | Resigned | 6 June 2023 | Pre-season | (England) Matthew Taylor | 26 June 2023 |
| Bournemouth | (England) Gary O'Neil | Sacked | 19 June 2023 | Pre-season | (Spain) Andoni Iraola | 19 June 2023 |
| Sheffield Wednesday | (Jamaica) Darren Moore | Mutual consent | 19 June 2023 | Pre-season | (Spain) Xisco Muñoz | 4 July 2023 |
| Swansea City | (Scotland) Russell Martin | Signed by Southampton | 21 June 2023 | Pre-season | (Northern Ireland) Michael Duff | 22 June 2023 |
| Barnsley | (Northern Ireland) Michael Duff | Signed by Swansea City | 22 June 2023 | Pre-season | (Scotland) Neill Collins | 6 July 2023 |
| Forest Green Rovers | (Scotland) Duncan Ferguson | Sacked | 4 July 2023 | Pre-season | (The Football Association) David Horseman | 18 July 2023 |
| Wolverhampton Wanderers | (Spain) Julen Lopetegui | Mutual consent | 8 August 2023 | Pre-season | (England) Gary O'Neil | 9 August 2023 |
| Charlton Athletic | (England) Dean Holden | Sacked | 27 August 2023 | 19th | (England) Michael Appleton | 8 September 2023 |
| Fleetwood Town | (Scotland) Scott Brown | Sacked | 3 September 2023 | 23rd | (England) Lee Johnson | 10 September 2023 |
| Tranmere Rovers | (England) Ian Dawes | Sacked | 10 September 2023 | 22nd | (England) Nigel Adkins (Note: Adkins was initially appointed interim manager before being permanently appointed on 2 November 2023) | 10 September 2023 |
| Huddersfield Town | (England) Neil Warnock | Resigned | 20 September 2023 | 16th | (Jamaica) Darren Moore | 21 September 2023 |
| Cheltenham Town | (England) Wade Elliott | Mutual consent | 20 September 2023 | 24th | (England) Darrell Clarke | 29 September 2023 |
| Bradford City | (Wales) Mark Hughes | Sacked | 4 October 2023 | 18th | (Scotland) Graham Alexander | 6 November 2023 |
| Sheffield Wednesday | (Spain) Xisco Muñoz | Sacked | 4 October 2023 | 24th | (Germany) Danny Röhl | 13 October 2023 |
| Gillingham | (England) Neil Harris | Sacked | 5 October 2023 | 8th | (England) Stephen Clemence | 1 November 2023 |
| Birmingham City | (England) John Eustace | Sacked | 9 October 2023 | 6th | (England) Wayne Rooney | 11 October 2023 |
| Milton Keynes Dons | (Scotland) Graham Alexander | Sacked | 16 October 2023 | 16th | (England) Mike Williamson | 17 October 2023 |
| Lincoln City | (Republic of Ireland) Mark Kennedy | Sacked | 18 October 2023 | 16th | (England) Michael Skubala | 13 November 2023 |
| Millwall | (England) Gary Rowett | Mutual consent | 18 October 2023 | 15th | (England) Joe Edwards | 6 November 2023 |
| Colchester United | (England) Ben Garner | Sacked | 21 October 2023 | 23rd | (England) Matthew Etherington (Note: Etherington was originally given the job on an interim basis before being permanently appointed on 16 November 2023) | 21 October 2023 |
| Bristol Rovers | (England) Joey Barton | Sacked | 26 October 2023 | 16th | (England) Matt Taylor | 1 December 2023 |
| Grimsby Town | (England) Paul Hurst | Sacked | 28 October 2023 | 21st | (Gibraltar) David Artell | 27 November 2023 |
| Queens Park Rangers | (England) Gareth Ainsworth | Sacked | 28 October 2023 | 23rd | (Spain) Martí Cifuentes | 30 October 2023 |
| Bristol City | (England) Nigel Pearson | Sacked | 29 October 2023 | 15th | (England) Liam Manning | 7 November 2023 |
| Oxford United | (England) Liam Manning | Signed by Bristol City | 7 November 2023 | 2nd | (England) Des Buckingham | 16 November 2023 |
| Rotherham United | (England) Matt Taylor | Sacked | 13 November 2023 | 22nd | (England) Leam Richardson | 11 December 2023 |
| Morecambe | (Scotland) Derek Adams | Signed by Ross County | 20 November 2023 | 9th | (England) Ged Brannan | 27 November 2023 |
| Cambridge United | (England) Mark Bonner | Sacked | 29 November 2023 | 18th | (England) Neil Harris | 6 December 2023 |
| Swansea City | (Northern Ireland) Michael Duff | Sacked | 4 December 2023 | 18th | (England) Luke Williams | 5 January 2024 |
| Sunderland | (England) Tony Mowbray | Sacked | 4 December 2023 | 9th | (England) Michael Beale | 18 December 2023 |
| Sheffield United | (England) Paul Heckingbottom | Sacked | 5 December 2023 | 20th | (England) Chris Wilder | 5 December 2023 |
| Burton Albion | (Tunisia) Dino Maamria | Sacked | 9 December 2023 | 19th | (Northern Ireland) Martin Paterson | 11 January 2024 |
| Stoke City | (Scotland) Alex Neil | Sacked | 10 December 2023 | 20th | (England) Steven Schumacher | 19 December 2023 |
| Sutton United | (England) Matt Gray | Sacked | 19 December 2023 | 24th | (Wales) Steve Morison | 6 January 2024 |
| Nottingham Forest | (Wales) Steve Cooper | Sacked | 19 December 2023 | 17th | (Portugal) Nuno Espírito Santo | 20 December 2023 |
| Plymouth Argyle | (England) Steven Schumacher | Signed by Stoke City | 19 December 2023 | 16th | (England) Ian Foster | 5 January 2024 |
| Forest Green Rovers F.C. | (England) David Horseman | Mutual consent | 20 December 2023 | 23rd | (England) Troy Deeney | 20 December 2023 |
| Salford City | (England) Neil Wood | Sacked | 27 December 2023 | 21st | (England) Karl Robinson | 5 January 2024 |
| Fleetwood Town | (England) Lee Johnson | Sacked | 30 December 2023 | 23rd | (Scotland) Charlie Adam | 31 December 2023 |
| Colchester United | (England) Matthew Etherington | Sacked | 1 January 2024 | 22nd | (England) Danny Cowley | 4 January 2024 |
| Birmingham City | (England) Wayne Rooney | Sacked | 2 January 2024 | 20th | (England) Tony Mowbray | 8 January 2024 |
| Notts County | (England) Luke Williams | Signed by Swansea City | 5 January 2024 | 5th | (England) Stuart Maynard | 18 January 2024 |
| Swindon Town | (England) Michael Flynn | Mutual consent | 15 January 2024 | 15th | (Republic of Ireland) Gavin Gunning (interim manager) | 15 January 2024 |
| Forest Green Rovers | (England) Troy Deeney | Sacked | 18 January 2024 | 24th | (England) Steve Cotterill | 25 January 2024 |
| Shrewsbury Town | (England) Matthew Taylor | Sacked | 21 January 2024 | 19th | (England) Paul Hurst | 24 January 2024 |
| Charlton Athletic | (England) Michael Appleton | Sacked | 23 January 2024 | 16th | (Wales) Nathan Jones | 4 February 2024 |
| Huddersfield Town | (Jamaica) Darren Moore | Sacked | 29 January 2024 | 21st | (Germany) André Breitenreiter | 15 February 2024 |
| Port Vale | (England) Andy Crosby | Sacked | 5 February 2024 | 20th | (Jamaica) Darren Moore | 13 February 2024 |
| Blackburn Rovers | (Denmark) Jon Dahl Tomasson | Mutual consent | 9 February 2024 | 18th | (England) John Eustace | 9 February 2024 |
| Crystal Palace | (England) Roy Hodgson | Resigned | 19 February 2024 | 16th | (Austria) Oliver Glasner | 19 February 2024 |
| Sunderland | (England) Michael Beale | Sacked | 19 February 2024 | 10th | (England) Mike Dodds (interim) | 19 February 2024 |
| Millwall | (England) Joe Edwards | Sacked | 21 February 2024 | 21st | (England) Neil Harris | 21 February 2024 |
| Cambridge United | (England) Neil Harris | Signed by Millwall | 21 February 2024 | 17th | (England) Garry Monk | 4 March 2024 |
| Accrington Stanley | (England) John Coleman | Sacked | 3 March 2024 | 16th | (England) John Doolan (Note: Doolan was initially appointed interim manager before being given the job permanently on 22 March 2024) | 4 March 2024 |
| Watford | (France) Valérien Ismaël | Sacked | 9 March 2024 | 13th | (England) Tom Cleverley (Note: Cleverley was initially appointed interim manager before being given the job permanently on 24 April 2024.) | 9 March 2024 |
| Birmingham City | (England) Tony Mowbray | Temporary medical leave of absence | 19 March 2024 | 21st | (England) Gary Rowett (interim) | 19 March 2024 |
| Plymouth Argyle | (England) Ian Foster | Sacked | 1 April 2024 | 21st | (England) Neil Dewsnip (interim head coach) | 1 April 2024 |
| Rotherham United | (England) Leam Richardson | Sacked | 17 April 2024 | 24th | (Scotland) Steve Evans | 17 April 2024 |
| Stevenage | (Scotland) Steve Evans | Signed by Rotherham United | 17 April 2024 | 9th | (England) Alex Revell (interim) | 17 April 2024 |
| Barnsley | (Scotland) Neill Collins | Sacked | 22 April 2024 | 5th | (Republic of Ireland) Martin Devaney (interim) | 22 April 2024 |

== Deaths ==
- 3 June 2023: Josser Watling, 98, Bristol Rovers outside left.
- 14 June 2023: John Hollins MBE, 76, England, Chelsea, Queens Park Rangers and Arsenal defender/midfielder, who also managed Chelsea, Swansea City and Rochdale.
- 15 June 2023: Gordon McQueen, 70, Scotland, Manchester United and Leeds United defender.
- 22 June 2023: Dave Wilkes, 59, Barnsley, Stockport County and Carlisle United midfielder.
- 24 June 2023: Cédric Roussel, 45, Belgium, Coventry City and Wolverhampton Wanderers striker.
- 26 June 2023: Craig Brown CBE, 82, Preston North End manager.
- 27 June 2023: Max Thompson, 66, Liverpool, Blackpool, Swansea City and AFC Bournemouth defender.
- 28 June 2023: Willie Carrick, 70, Luton Town goalkeeper.
- 2 July 2023: Wayne Evans, 51, Walsall and Rochdale defender.
- 5 July 2023: Keith Ball, 82, Walsall and Port Vale goalkeeper.
- 13 July 2023: Chris Garland, 74, Bristol City, Chelsea and Leicester City forward.
- 18 July 2023: Mike Hellawell, 85, England, Queens Park Rangers, Birmingham City, Sunderland, Huddersfield Town and Peterborough United outside right.
- 22 July 2023: Paul Hince, 78, Manchester City, Charlton Athletic, Bury and Crewe Alexandra winger.
- 24 July 2023: Chris Bart-Williams, 49, Leyton Orient, Sheffield Wednesday, Nottingham Forest, Charlton Athletic and Ipswich Town midfielder.
- 24 July 2023: Trevor Francis, 69, England, Birmimgham City, Nottingham Forest, Manchester City, Queens Park Rangers and Sheffield Wednesday striker, who also managed Queens Park Rangers, Sheffield Wednesday, Birmingham City and Crystal Palace.
- 24 July 2023: Tony Priscott, 82, Portsmouth, Aldershot and AFC Bournemouth winger.
- 1 August 2023: Tony Brien, 54, Leicester City, Chesterfield, Rotherham United, West Bromwich Albion and Hull City defender.
- 9 August 2023: John Coddington, 85, Huddersfield Town, Blackburn Rovers and Stockport County defender.
- 10 August 2023: Alec Jackson, 86, West Bromwich Albion, Birmingham City and Walsall winger.
- 13 August 2023: Joe Caven, 86, Brighton & Hove Albion forward.
- 14 August 2023: Brian Snowdon, 88, Blackpool, Portsmouth, Millwall and Crystal Palace defender.
- 21 August 2023: Andy Rankin, 79, Everton, Watford and Huddersfield Town goalkeeper.
- 22 August 2023: Barry Howard, 73, Stockport County forward.
- 22 August 2023: Bobby Noble, 77, Manchester United defender.
- 2 September 2023: Mark Pearson, 83, Manchester United, Sheffield Wednesday, Fulham and Halifax Town inside forward.
- 5 September 2023: Robin Gladwin, 83, Norwich City and Oxford United defender.
- 6 September 2023: Ian Hamilton, 55, Cambridge United, Scunthorpe United, West Bromwich Albion, Sheffield United, Notts County and Lincoln City midfielder.
- c. 9 September 2023: John Harris, 84, Wolverhampton Wanderers and Walsall defender.
- 10 September 2023: Colin Ayre, 67, Torquay United midfielder.
- 16 September 2023: Colin Murphy, 79, Derby County, Lincoln City, Stockport County, Southend United and Notts County manager.
- 17 September 2023: Arthur Longbottom, 90, Queens Park Rangers, Port Vale, Millwall, Oxford United and Colchester United forward.
- 25 September 2023: Harry Poole, 88, Port Vale half-back.
- c. 26 September 2023: David Hughes, 65, Aston Villa, Lincoln City and Scunthorpe United midfielder.
- 27 September 2023: Jim Forrest, 79, Scotland and Preston North End striker.
- 2 October 2023: Francis Lee CBE, 79, England, Bolton Wanderers, Manchester City and Derby County forward, who was also chairman at Manchester City for four years.
- 2 October 2023: Gary Simpson, 64, Chesterfield and Chester City forward.
- 4 October 2023: Tommy Hoyland, 91, Sheffield United and Bradford City wing half.
- 6 October 2023: Bill Munro, 89, Barrow inside forward.
- 10 October 2023: Wilf Billington, 93, Workington goalkeeper.
- 12 October 2023: Neil Le Bihan, 47, Peterborough United midfielder.
- 15 October 2023: Gerry Ryan, 68, Republic of Ireland, Derby County and Brighton & Hove Albion forward.
- 17 October 2023: Gordon Low, 83, Huddersfield Town, Bristol City, Stockport County and Crewe Alexandra defender.
- 21 October 2023: Bobby Charlton, 86, England World Cup winner, who made over 600 appearances for Manchester United and was also the player/manager at Preston North End.
- 23 October 2023: Bill Gates, 79, Middlesbrough defender.
- 24 October 2023: Bill Kenwright, 78, Everton chairman.
- 26 October 2023: John Wilkie, 76, Halifax Town and Wigan Athletic winger.
- 28 October 2023: Domenico Genovese, 62, Peterborough United forward.
- 29 October 2023: Charlie Aitken, 81, Aston Villa defender, who is the club's record appearance maker with 660 games between 1959 and 1976.
- October 2023: Ronnie Rees, 79, Wales, Coventry City, West Bromwich Albion, Nottingham Forest and Swansea City winger.
- 6 November 2023: John Fahy, 80, Oxford United forward.
- 10 November 2023: Miah Dennehy, 73, Republic of Ireland, Nottingham Forest, Walsall and Bristol Rovers winger.
- 14 November 2023: Barrie Wright, 78, Leeds United and Brighton & Hove Albion defender.
- 22 November 2023: Mike Bickle, 79, Plymouth Argyle and Gillingham forward.
- 25 November 2023: Terry Venables, 80, England, Chelsea, Tottenham Hotspur, Queens Park Rangers and Crystal Palace midfielder, who also managed the England national team, Crystal Palace, Queens Park Rangers, Tottenham Hotspur, Middlesbrough and Leeds United.
- 28 November 2023: Rod Fletcher, 78, Crewe Alexandra, Lincoln City, Scunthorpe United and Grimsby Town forward.
- 28 November 2023: Alex Smith, 85, Bolton Wanderers, Halifax Town and Preston North End goalkeeper.
- 29 November 2023: Frank Corrigan, 71, Walsall and Wigan Athletic midfielder.
- c. 5 December 2023: Martin Patching, 65, Wolverhampton Wanderers and Watford midfielder.
- 19 December 2023: Andy Clements, 68, Bolton Wanderers and York City defender.
- 20 December 2023: Pat Quartermain, 86, Oxford United defender.
- 26 December 2023: Noel Peyton, 88, Republic of Ireland, Leeds United and York City inside left.
- 30 December 2023: Bernie Fagan, 74, Northampton Town defender.
- 30 December 2023: Lammie Robertson, 76, Bury, Halifax Town, Brighton & Hove Albion, Exeter City, Leicester City, Peterborough United and Bradford City midfielder.
- 3 January 2024: Bobby Hoy, 73, Huddersfield Town, Blackburn Rovers, Halifax Town, York City and Rochdale midfielder.
- 10 January 2024: Peter Johnson, 84, Everton and Tranmere Rovers chairman.
- 11 January 2024: Mel Blyth, 79, Scunthorpe United, Crystal Palace, Southampton and Millwall defender.
- 17 January 2024: Alex South, 93, Brighton & Hove Albion, Liverpool and Halifax Town defender.
- 18 January 2024: Ray Henderson, 86, Middlesbrough, Hull City and Reading midfielder, who also managed Halifax Town and Southport.
- 18 January 2024: John Hurst, 76, Everton and Oldham Athletic wing half.
- 22 January 2024: Tommy Baldwin, 78, Arsenal, Chelsea and Brentford midfielder/forward.
- 27 January 2024: Stuart Gray, 50, Reading, Rushden & Diamonds and Oxford United defender.
- 28 January 2024: Lenny Piper, 46, Gillingham midfielder.
- 9 February 2024: Peter Handyside, 49, Grimsby Town, Stoke City and Barnsley defender.
- 10 February 2024: Ian Lawson, 84, Burnley, Leeds United, Crystal Palace and Port Vale forward.
- 16 February 2024: Jan Sørensen, 68, Walsall manager.
- 21 February 2024: Charlie Strutton, 34, AFC Wimbledon forward.
- c. 22 February 2024: Paul Bradshaw, 67, Blackburn Rovers, Wolverhampton Wanderers, West Bromwich Albion, Bristol Rovers, Newport County and Peterborough United goalkeeper.
- 24 February 2024: Stan Bowles, 75, England, Manchester City, Bury, Crewe Alexandra, Carlisle United, Queens Park Rangers, Nottingham Forest, Leyton Orient and Brentford forward/midfielder.
- 24 February 2024: Chris Nicholl, 77, Northern Ireland, Halifax Town, Luton Town, Aston Villa, Southampton and Grimsby Town defender, who also managed Southampton and Walsall.
- 27 February 2024: Paul Bevan, 71, Shrewsbury Town, Swansea City and Crewe Alexandra defender.
- c. 3 March 2024: Brian Honeywood, 74, Colchester United defender.
- 7 March 2024: Mike Eckersall, 85, Torquay United and Stockport County midfielder.
- 9 March 2024: Jimmy Husband, 76, Everton and Luton Town forward.
- 13 March 2024: Steve Smith, 77, Huddersfield Town and Halifax Town defender/midfielder, who also managed Huddersfield Town.
- 13 March 2024: Gerry Summers, 90, West Bromwich Albion, Sheffield United, Hull City and Walsall left half, who also managed Oxford United and Gillingham.
- 14 March 2024: Mal Lucas, 85, Wales, Leyton Orient, Norwich City and Torquay United right half.
- 18 March 2024: Ron Baynham, 94, England and Luton Town goalkeeper.
- 18 March 2024: Billy Kellock, 70, Cardiff City, Norwich City, Peterborough United, Luton Town, Wolverhampton Wanderers, Southend United, Port Vale and Halifax Town midfielder.
- 21 March 2024: David Jackson, 87, Bradford City, Tranmere Rovers and Halifax Town inside forward.
- 22 March 2024: Peter Bennett, 77, West Ham United and Leyton Orient inside forward.
- 26 March 2024: Mick Collins, 86, Luton Town defender.
- 28 March 2024: Larry Lloyd, 75, England, Bristol Rovers, Liverpool, Coventry City, Nottingham Forest and Wigan Athletic defender, who also managed Wigan Athletic and Notts County.
- 30 March 2024: Alex McGregor, 73, Shrewsbury Town and Aldershot midfielder.
- c. 31 March 2024: Paul Bence, 75, Brighton & Hove Albion, Reading and Brentford midfielder/defender.
- 6 April 2024: Dickie Rooks, 83, Sunderland, Middlesbrough and Bristol City defender, who also managed Scunthorpe United.
- 7 April 2024: Joe Kinnear, 77, Republic of Ireland, Tottenham Hotspur and Brighton & Hove Albion defender, who also managed Wimbledon, Luton Town, Nottingham Forest and Newcastle United.
- 9 April 2024: Dave Mehmet, 63, Millwall, Charlton Athletic and Gillingham midfielder.
- 14 April 2024: Gordon Ferry, 80, Arsenal and Leyton Orient defender.
- 19 April 2024: Leighton James, 71, Wales, Burnley, Derby County, Queens Park Rangers, Swansea City, Sunderland, Bury and Newport County midfielder.
- 22 April 2024: Charlie Hurley, 87, Republic of Ireland, Millwall, Sunderland and Bolton Wanderers defender, who also managed Reading.
- 23 April 2024: George Baker, 88, Wales, Plymouth Argyle and Shrewsbury Town midfielder/forward.
- 25 April 2024: Bob Appleby, 84, Middlesbrough goalkeeper.
- 1 May 2024: Terry Medwin, 91, Wales, Swansea City and Tottenham Hotspur outside right.
- 1 May 2024: Ian Mellor, 74, Manchester City, Norwich City, Brighton & Hove Albion, Chester City, Sheffield Wednesday and Bradford City midfielder.
- 2 May 2024: Derek Forster, 75, Sunderland, Charlton Athletic and Brighton & Hove Albion goalkeeper.
- 5 May 2024: Phil Hoadley, 72, Crystal Palace, Leyton Orient and Norwich City defender.
- 6 May 2024: Steve Harney, 73, Bradford City defender.
- c. 8 May 2024: Viv Busby, 74, Luton Town, Fulham, Norwich City, Stoke City, Blackburn Rovers and York City forward, who also managed Hartlepool United.
- 8 May 2024: Paul Holmes, 56, Doncaster Rovers, Torquay United, Birmingham City, Everton and West Bromwich Albion defender.
- 10 May 2024: Frank Sibley, 76, Queens Park Rangers defender, who also managed Queens Park Rangers and Walsall.
- 16 May 2024: John Brown, 76, Preston North End, Stockport County and Wigan Athletic goalkeeper.
- 18 May 2024: Graham Cox, 65, Brentford and Aldershot goalkeeper.
- 19 May 2024: Ian Hamilton, 73, Chelsea, Southend United, Aston Villa and Sheffield United midfielder.
- c. 30 May 2024: Trevor Edwards, 87, Wales, Charlton Athletic and Cardiff City defender.

== Retirements ==
- 5 June 2023: Zlatan Ibrahimović, 41, former Sweden and Manchester United striker.
- 5 June 2023: Jacob Mellis, 32, former Chelsea, Southampton, Barnsley, Blackpool, Oldham Athletic, Bury, Mansfield Town, Bolton Wanderers, Gillingham and Southend United midfielder.
- 14 June 2023: Rhys Williams, 34, former Australia, Middlesbrough, Burnley and Charlton Athletic defender.
- 21 June 2023: Asamoah Gyan, 37, former Ghana and Sunderland striker, who is the record goalscorer for his country.
- 26 June 2023: Maxime Le Marchand, 31, former Fulham defender.
- 27 June 2023: Phil Bardsley, 37, former Scotland, Manchester United, Sunderland, Stoke City, Burnley and Stockport County defender.
- 30 June 2023: Aaron Mooy, 32, former Australia, Bolton Wanderers, Manchester City, Huddersfield Town, and Brighton & Hove Albion midfielder
- 1 July 2023: Tom Cleverley, 33, former England, Great Britain Olympic, Manchester United, Everton and Watford midfielder.
- 1 July 2023: Cesc Fabregas, 36, former Spain, Arsenal and Chelsea midfielder.
- 5 July 2023: André Moritz, 36, former Crystal Palace and Bolton Wanderers midfielder.
- 10 July 2023: Willy Caballero, 41, former Argentina, Manchester City, Chelsea and Southampton goalkeeper.
- 27 July 2023: Eoin Doyle, 35, former Chesterfield, Cardiff City, Preston North End, Bradford City, Swindon Town and Bolton Wanderers forward.
- 27 July 2023: David Silva, 37, former Spain and Manchester City midfielder.
- 3 August 2023: Luke Chambers, 37, former Northampton Town, Nottingham Forest, Ipswich Town and Colchester United defender.
- 7 August 2023: James McArthur, 35, former Scotland, Wigan Athletic and Crystal Palace midfielder.
- 16 August 2023: Eddie Nolan, 35, former Republic of Ireland, Blackburn Rovers, Preston North End, Scunthorpe United, York City, Blackpool and Crewe Alexandra defender.
- 17 August 2023: Henri Lansbury, 32, former Arsenal, Nottingham Forest, Aston Villa, Bristol City and Luton Town midfielder.
- 12 August 2023: Kevin-Prince Boateng, 36, former Ghana and Portsmouth midfielder and forward.
- 18 August 2023: Theo Walcott, 34, former England, Southampton, Arsenal and Everton forward.
- 21 August 2023: Ben Foster, 40, former England, Wrexham, Manchester United, Watford, Birmingham City, West Bromwich Albion goalkeeper.
- 29 August 2023: Matthew Briggs, 32, former Guyana, Fulham, Millwall, Colchester United, Chesterfield and Barnet defender.
- 1 September 2023: David Wheater, 36, former Middlesbrough, Doncaster Rovers, Wolverhampton Wanderers, Darlington, Bolton Wanderers, and Oldham Athletic defender.
- 4 September 2023: Tom Clarke, 35, former Huddersfield Town, Bradford City, Leyton Orient, Preston North End, Salford City and Fleetwood Town defender.
- 4 September 2023: Charlie Mulgrew, 37, former Scotland, Wolverhampton Wanderers and Blackburn Rovers defender.
- 4 September 2023: Sandro, 34, former Brazil, Tottenham Hotspur and Queens Park Rangers midfielder.
- 11 September 2023: Anssi Jaakkola, 36, former Finland, Reading and Bristol Rovers goalkeeper.
- 13 September 2023: Chris Hussey, 34, former Coventry City, Crewe Alexandra, AFC Wimbledon, Burton Albion, Bury, Sheffield United, Swindon Town, Cheltenham Town, Port Vale, Stockport County and Walsall defender.
- 14 September 2023: Sam Baldock, 34, former Milton Keynes Dons, West Ham United, Bristol City, Brighton & Hove Albion, Reading, Derby County and Oxford United forward.
- 20 September 2023: Danny Rose, 35, former Fleetwood Town, Aldershot Town, Oxford United, Northampton Town, Portsmouth, Swindon Town and Grimsby Town midfielder.
- 20 September 2023: Craig Cathcart, 34, former Northern Ireland, Blackpool and Watford defender.
- 3 October 2023: Tom Rogic, 30, former Australia and West Bromwich Albion midfielder.
- 8 October 2023: Loïc Rémy, 36, former France, Queens Park Rangers and Chelsea forward.
- 10 October 2023: Eden Hazard, 32, former Belgium and Chelsea winger.
- 17 October 2023: Mike Williamson, 39, former Torquay United, Wycombe Wanderers, Watford, Newcastle United, Wolverhampton Wanderers and Oxford United defender.
- 23 October 2023: Darnell Fisher, 29, former Rotherham United, Preston North End and Middlesbrough defender.
- 30 October 2023: Danny Drinkwater, 33, former England, Leicester City and Chelsea midfielder.
- 30 October 2023: Craig Noone, 35, former Skelmersdale, Burscough, Southport, Plymouth Argyle, Exeter City, Brighton & Hove Albion, Cardiff City and Bolton Wanderers midfielder.
- 1 November 2023: Kean Bryan, 27, former Sheffield United and West Bromwich Albion defender.
- 14 November 2023: Alex Song, 36, former Cameroon, Arsenal, Charlton Athletic and West Ham United midfielder and defender.
- 17 November 2023: Royston Drenthe, 36, former Netherlands, Everton, Sheffield Wednesday and Reading winger.
- 28 November 2023: Phil Jagielka, 41, former England, Sheffield United, Everton, Derby County and Stoke City defender.
- 28 November 2023: Carl Magnay, 34, former Milton Keynes Dons, Northampton Town and Hartlepool United defender.
- 29 November 2023: Craig Woodman, 40, former Bristol City, Mansfield Town, Torquay United, Wycombe Wanderers, Brentford and Exeter City defender.
- 6 December 2023: Sam Winnall, 32, former Wolverhampton Wanderers, Scunthorpe United, Barnsley, Sheffield Wednesday, Oxford United and Burton Albion forward.
- 8 December 2023: Liam O'Neil, 30, former West Bromwich Albion, Chesterfield and Cambridge United midfielder.
- 18 December 2023: Emyr Huws, 30, former Wales, Manchester City, Wigan Athletic, Cardiff City, Ipswich Town and Colchester United midfielder.
- 6 January 2024: Luke Joyce, 36, former Carlisle United, Accrington Stanley and Port Vale midfielder.
- 7 January 2024: James Hanson, 37, former Bradford City, Sheffield United, Bury, AFC Wimbledon and Grimsby Town forward.
- 16 January 2024: Robert Snodgrass, 36, former Scotland, Leeds United, Norwich City, Hull City, West Ham United, West Bromwich Albion and Luton Town midfielder.
- 22 January 2024: Alex Smithies, 33, former Huddersfield Town, Queens Park Rangers, Cardiff City and Leicester City goalkeeper.
- 25 January 2024: Steven Davis MBE, 39, former Northern Ireland, Aston Villa, Fulham and Southampton midfielder.
- 31 January 2024: Ira Jackson Jr, 27, former Grimsby Town forward.
- 3 February 2024: Marouane Fellaini, 36, former Belgium, Everton and Manchester United midfielder.
- 6 February 2024: Nicolai Brock-Madsen, 31, former Birmingham City forward.
- 6 February 2024: Jamie Devitt, 33, former Hull City, Chesterfield, Morecambe, Carlisle United and Barrow midfielder.
- 6 February 2024: James Weir, 28, former Manchester United, Hull City, Wigan Athletic and Bolton Wanderers midfielder.
- 28 February 2024: George Friend, 36, former Exeter City, Wolverhampton Wanderers, Millwall, Southend United, Scunthorpe United, Doncaster Rovers, Middlesbrough, Birmingham City and Bristol Rovers defender.
- 16 March 2024: Liam Fontaine, 38, former Fulham and Bristol City defender.
- 16 March 2024: Jeffrey Monakana, 30, former Preston North End, Colchester United, Crawley Town, Mansfield Town, Carlisle United and Bristol Rovers midfielder.
- 10 April 2024: Stuart Dallas, 32, former Northern Ireland, Brentford and Leeds United midfielder/defender.
- 20 April 2024: Alan Julian, 41, former Brentford, Gillingham and Stevenage goalkeeper.
- 26 April 2024: Bradley Johnson, 36, former Cambridge United, Northampton Town, Leeds United, Norwich City, Derby County, Blackburn Rovers and Milton Keynes Dons midfielder.
- 27 April 2024: Louis Dodds, 37, former Port Vale, Shrewsbury Town and Chesterfield midfielder/striker.
- 29 April 2024: David Norris, 43, former Bolton Wanderers, Plymouth Argyle, Ipswich Town, Portsmouth, Leeds United, Peterborough United, Yeovil Town and Blackpool midfielder.
- 29 April 2024: Chris Solly, 33, former Charlton Athletic defender.
- 3 May 2024: Richard Keogh, 37, former Republic of Ireland, Bristol City, Carlisle United, Coventry City, Derby County, Milton Keynes Dons, Huddersfield Town, Blackpool, Ipswich Town, Wycombe Wanderers and Forest Green Rovers defender.
- 4 May 2024: Andy King, 35, former Wales, Leicester City and Bristol City midfielder.
- 6 May 2024: Sone Aluko, 35, former Nigeria, Birmingham City, Hull City, Fulham, Reading and Ipswich Town forward.
- 16 May 2024: Nathan Blissett, 33, former Bristol Rovers, Plymouth Argyle and Macclesfield Town forward.
- 16 May 2024: John White, 37, former Colchester United and Southend United defender.
- 18 May 2024: Antony Kay, 41, former Barnsley, Tranmere Rovers, Huddersfield Town, Milton Keynes Dons, Bury and Port Vale defender.
- 23 May 2024: Dan Gosling, 34, former Plymouth Argyle, Everton, Newcastle United, Blackpool, AFC Bournemouth, Watford and Notts County midfielder.
- 25 May 2024: Joe Hart, 37, former England, Shrewsbury Town, Manchester City, Burnley and Tottenham Hotspur goalkeeper.
- 25 May 2024: Sokratis Papastathopoulos, 35, former Greece and Arsenal defender.
- 27 May 2024: Yaser Kasim, 33, former Iraq, Brighton & Hove Albion, Swindon Town and Northampton Town midfielder.
