= Robin Gladwin =

English footballer (1940–2023)

Personal information
- Full name: Robin Gladwin
- Date of birth: 12 August 1940
- Place of birth: Harlow, England
- Date of death: September 2023 (aged 83)
- Place of death: Didcot, England
- Position(s): Left-back

Senior career*
Years	Team	Apps	(Gls)
- Harlow Town
- Cambridge City
1963–1966	Chelmsford City		
1966–1968	Norwich City	16	(0)
1968–1970	Oxford United	44	(0)
- *Club domestic league appearances and goals

Robin Gladwin (12 August 1940 – 5 September 2023) was an English footballer who played as a left-back.

== Career ==
Gladwin began his career in non-league with hometown club Harlow Town, before moving to Cambridge City and Chelmsford City. In January 1966, Gladwin signed for Second Division club Norwich City. Gladwin made 16 Football League appearances during his time at Norwich, before signing for Oxford United, where he played 48 times in all competitions, before retiring in 1970 due to injuries.

== Death ==
Gladwin died in Didcot on 5 September 2023, at the age of 83.
