= Steve Harney =

English footballer (1951–2024)

Personal information
- Full name: Stephen Graham Harney
- Date of birth: 18 February 1951
- Place of birth: Bradford, England
- Date of death: 6 May 2024 (aged 73)
- Position: Right-back

Youth career
- Drum Rovers

Senior career*
| Years | Team | Apps | (Gls) |
| 1969–1977 | Bradford City | 14 | (0) |
- Guiseley
- * Club domestic league appearances and goals

Stephen Graham Harney (18 February 1951 – 6 May 2024) was an English professional footballer who played as a right-back.

== Career ==
Born in Bradford, Harney played for Drum Rovers, Bradford City and Guiseley. For Bradford City he made 14 appearances in the Football League. With Guiseley he won the West Riding County Cup in 1979, 1980, 1981 and 1983, and he also won the Yorkshire League Cup.

== Death ==
Harney died on 6 May 2024, at the age of 73.

== Sources ==
- Frost, Terry (1988). Bradford City A Complete Record 1903-1988. Breedon Books Sport. ISBN 0-907969-38-0. OCLC 26723937. OL 11378393M.
