= Domenico Genovese =

English footballer and manager (1961–2023)

Personal information
- Date of birth: 2 February 1961
- Place of birth: Peterborough, England
- Date of death: 28 October 2023 (aged 62)
- Place of death: Peterborough, England
- Position: Forward

Senior career*
Years	Team	Apps	(Gls)
- Stamford
1984–1986	Boston United	27	(1)
- Nuneaton Borough
- Kettering Town
- Grantham
- Cambridge City
1988–1989	Peterborough United	24	(1)
- Wisbech Town
- Holbeach United
- Grebbestads IF

Managerial career
- 2003: Kettering Town
- 2007–2008: Spalding United
- * Club domestic league appearances and goals

Domenico Genovese (2 February 1961 – 28 October 2023) was an English professional football player and manager.

== Playing career ==
Genovese began his career with spells at several non-league sides including two spells with Boston United and one with Kettering Town. After a trial with Manchester United, he signed with his home town club Peterborough United in 1987, making his debut during a 2–1 victory over Exeter City at London Road. He left the club a year later having made sixteen league appearances, his last appearance for the Posh coming in a 2–0 win over Doncaster Rovers.

After leaving Peterborough, Genovese signed and moved into Non-League football, playing for Wisbech Town, Holbeach United, as well as moving to Sweden, playing for Grebbestads IF.

== Managerial career ==
Genovese ended his playing career and became a Football in the Community officer for then Southern League Premier Division side Kettering Town. In 2003, he took over as caretaker-manager of the Poppies, with the mission of keeping the side in the Conference National following their struggle upon their return, Genovese failed this and as the town of Kettering was the nearest to the town of Aldershot, the club were put in the Isthmian League to replace the "Shots". Despite this, Genovese was offered the position on a permanent basis, and his first match in charge saw his Kettering side beat Northwood 2–1.

Following a bad run of results, which saw them bowl out of the cup at the last qualifying round of the FA Cup to lower grade Boreham Wood which denied them a place in the first round proper, Genovese left and was later succeeded by Kevin Wilson.

In 2007, Genovese was appointed Director of Football of Spalding United, and later spent a short time as caretaker-manager following the departure of Phil Hubbard.

Genovese was later a director of "Soccer Star" which is a football academy for children.

Genovese died on 28 October 2023, at the age of 62.
