= Alex Smith (footballer, born 1938) =

English footballer (1938–2023)

Personal information
- Date of birth: 29 October 1938
- Place of birth: Lancaster, England
- Date of death: November 28, 2023 (aged 85)
- Place of death: Bolton, England
- Position: Goalkeeper

Senior career*
Years	Team	Apps	(Gls)
19??–1961	Weymouth		
1961–1962	Accrington Stanley	0	(0)
1962–1967	Bolton Wanderers	20	(0)
1967–1976	Halifax Town	350	(0)
1976–1977	Preston North End	8	(0)
Total		378	(0)
- * Club domestic league appearances and goals

Alex Smith (29 October 1938 – 28 November 2023) was an English footballer who played as a goalkeeper in the Football League in the 1960s and 1970s, notably with Halifax Town.

He was the Accrington Stanley goalkeeper in all their games in the 1961–62 season, but following their resignation from the league, their results were expunged and he is not shown officially to have played any league games for them.

After Accrington's demise he moved to Bolton Wanderers, and then on to Halifax Town for whom he made over 300 league appearances. His final league club was Preston North End.

He later became the goalkeeping coach at Bolton's academy, leaving the club in 2009, where he went on to take over the day to day running of his family business, the Bolton Bed Centre
