= Gordon Ferry =

English footballer

Personal information
- Date of birth: 22 December 1943 (age 82)
- Place of birth: Sunderland, England
- Position: Defender

Senior career*
| Years | Team | Apps | (Gls) |
| 1964–1965 | Arsenal | 11 | (0) |
| 1965–1966 | Leyton Orient | 42 | (0) |
| 1966–1967 | Atlanta Chiefs | 55 | (0) |
| 1967–1974 | Barnet | 333 | |

Managerial career
- 1974: Barnet
- * Club domestic league appearances and goals

Gordon Ferry (born 22 December 1943) is an English former footballer who played in the Football League for Arsenal and Leyton Orient. He also had a short spell as manager of Barnet in 1974.
