= Brian Snowdon =

English footballer (1935–2023)

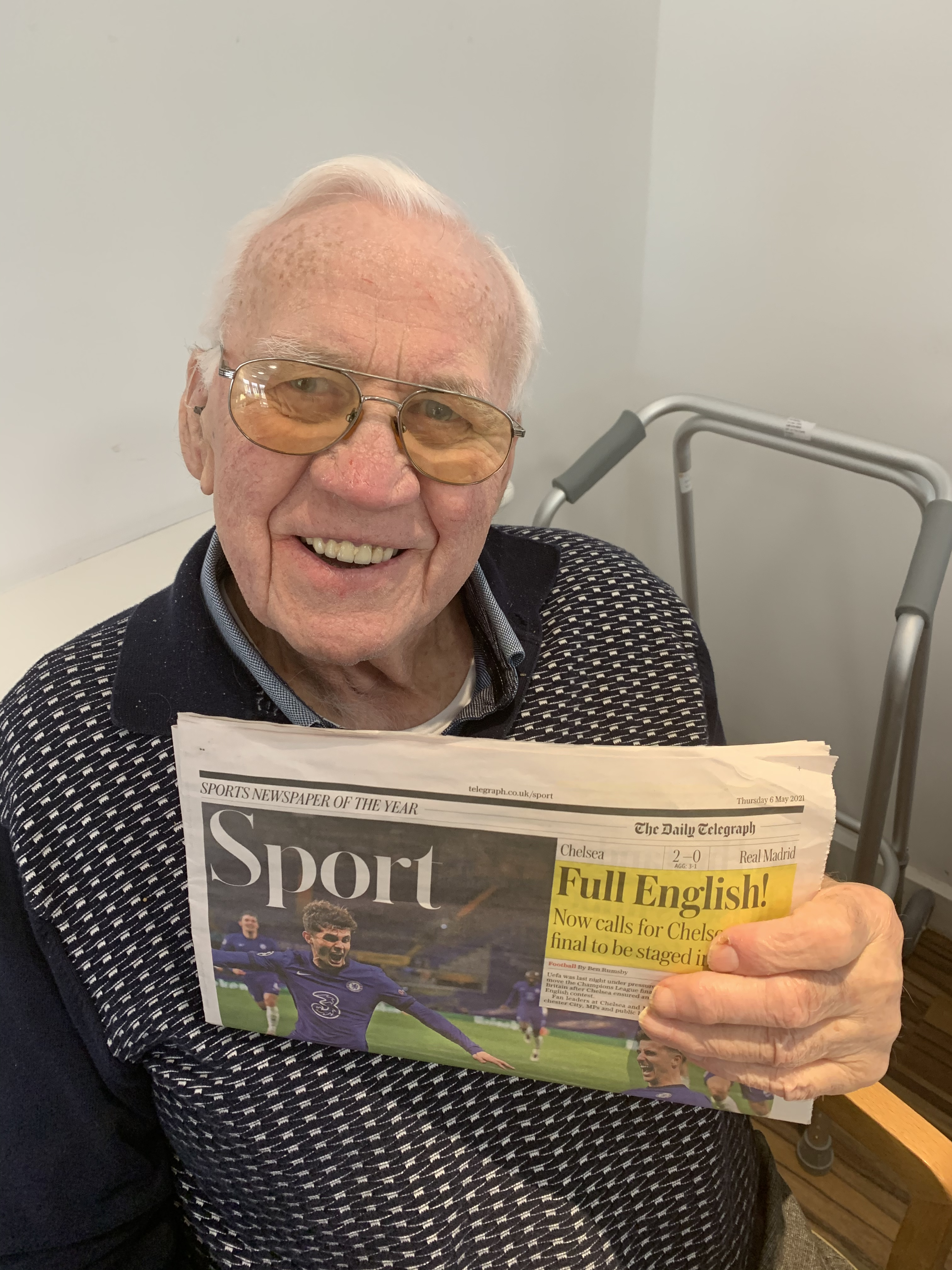
- 2021 by EleanorMickel

Personal information
- Birth name: Brian Victor Snowdon
- Date of birth: 1 January 1935
- Place of birth: Bishop Auckland, England
- Date of death: 1 August 2023 (aged 88)
- Position: Defender

Youth career
- Bishop Auckland BC

Senior career*
Years	Team	Apps	(Gls)
1955–1960	Blackpool	18	(1)
1960–1964	Portsmouth	114	(0)
1964–1967	Millwall	128	(0)
1967–1968	Margate		
1968	Detroit Cougars	27	(0)
1969	Crystal Palace	5	(0)
1969–1970	Brentwood Town		
1970–1971	Chelmsford City		
- * Club domestic league appearances and goals

Bryan Victor Snowdon (listed in some sources as Brian Snowden and also as Bryan, 1 January 1935 – 1 August 2023) was an English professional footballer who played in the Football League for Blackpool, Portsmouth, Millwall and Crystal Palace as a defender. He also played non-league football for Margate and Brentwood and had a spell towards the end of his career with Detroit Cougars.

== Career ==
Brian Snowdon was born in Bishop Auckland and began his youth career with Bishop Auckland BC before signing for Blackpool of the First Division in 1955. Between then and 1960 he made 18 appearances scoring the only goal of his senior professional career. In 1960, he moved to Portsmouth who had just been relegated from the First Division. At Portsmouth, his first-team opportunities improved, making 114 league appearances over the next four seasons but without scoring. In 1964, he moved to Millwall, making 128 appearances in three years and captaining the side in two promotion seasons before moving into non-league football with Margate, in 1967. At Margate he was made club captain, despite being on a short-term contract due to an already impending move to Detroit Cougars which took place in December 1967.

Snowdon then spent a year with Detroit Cougars making 27 appearances in the 1968 season before returning to the UK, signing a short-term contract with Crystal Palace in February 1969. He made five appearances (four as a substitute) in the latter half of the 1968–69 season at the end of which Palace won promotion to the top tier for the first time. He was released at the end of the season, returning to non-league football with Brentwood. He subsequently played for Chelmsford City, in 1970–71, after they merged with Brentwood.

== Personal life and death ==
Outside of football, Snowdon worked as a PE teacher and also ran a service station. He died on 1 August 2023, at the age of 88.
