= John Harris (footballer, born 1939) =

English footballer (1939–2023)

Personal information
- Date of birth: 3 April 1939
- Place of birth: Gornal, West Midlands, England
- Date of death: September 2023 (aged 84)
- Position: Full-back

Youth career
- 1955–1958: Wolverhampton Wanderers

Senior career*
Years	Team	Apps	(Gls)
1958–1965	Wolverhampton Wanderers	3	(0)
1965–1969	Walsall	74	(2)
Total		77	(2)
- * Club domestic league appearances and goals

John Harris (3 April 1939 – September 2023) was an English professional footballer who played as a full-back. He played in the Football League for Wolverhampton Wanderers and Walsall.

== Career ==
Harris joined Wolverhampton Wanderers in 1955 as a junior. He signed professional forms in May 1958, and made his senior debut on 26 August 1961 in a 3–2 win against West Ham United. However, he broke his leg the following week in only his second appearance and was out of the first team until December 1962, when he made his final appearance for the club. He made a total of 3 appearances in the Football League for Wolves.

In January 1965, Harris moved to Midlands neighbours Walsall. He made 74 league appearances, - many as captain - in the Third Division for the Saddlers, before he dropped into non-league football with Rushall Olympic.

== Death ==
Harris died in September 2023, at the age of 84.
