= 2024 Tokyo gubernatorial election =

Election for Governor of Tokyo

- 7 July 2024
- Turnout: 60.62% (▲5.62 pp)
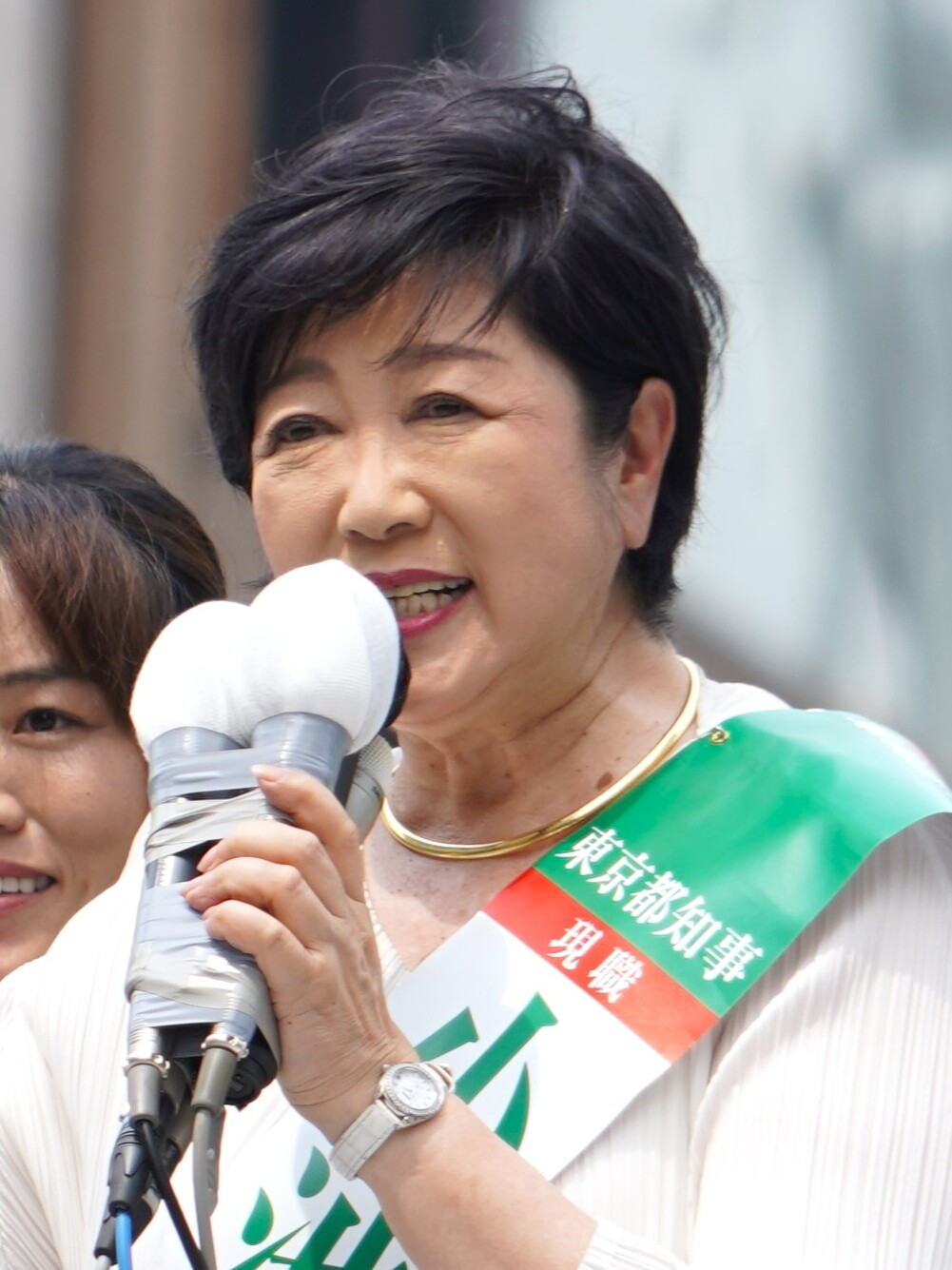

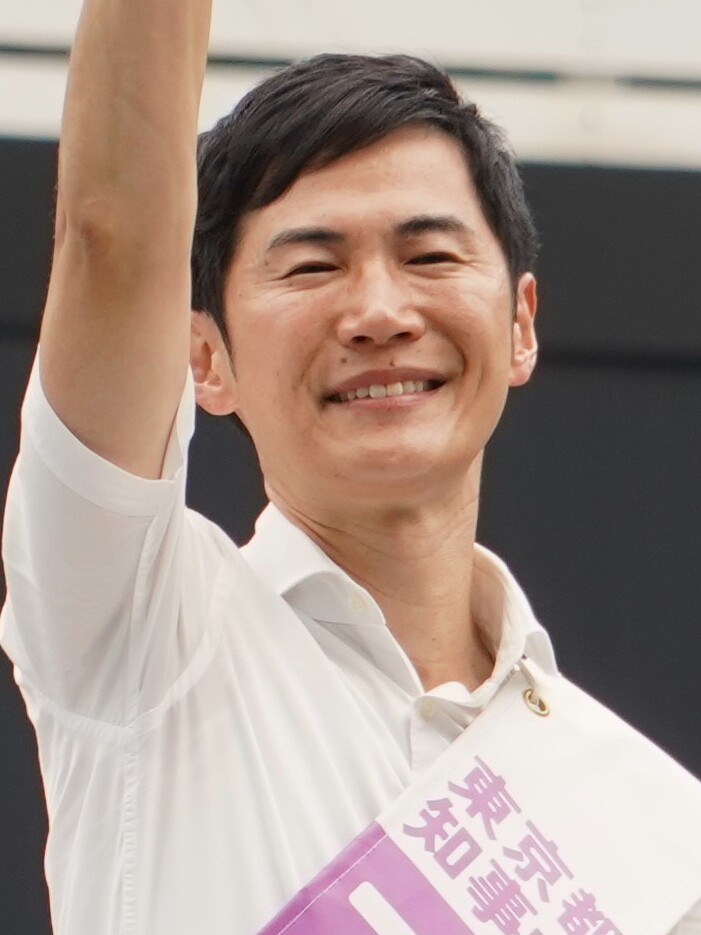

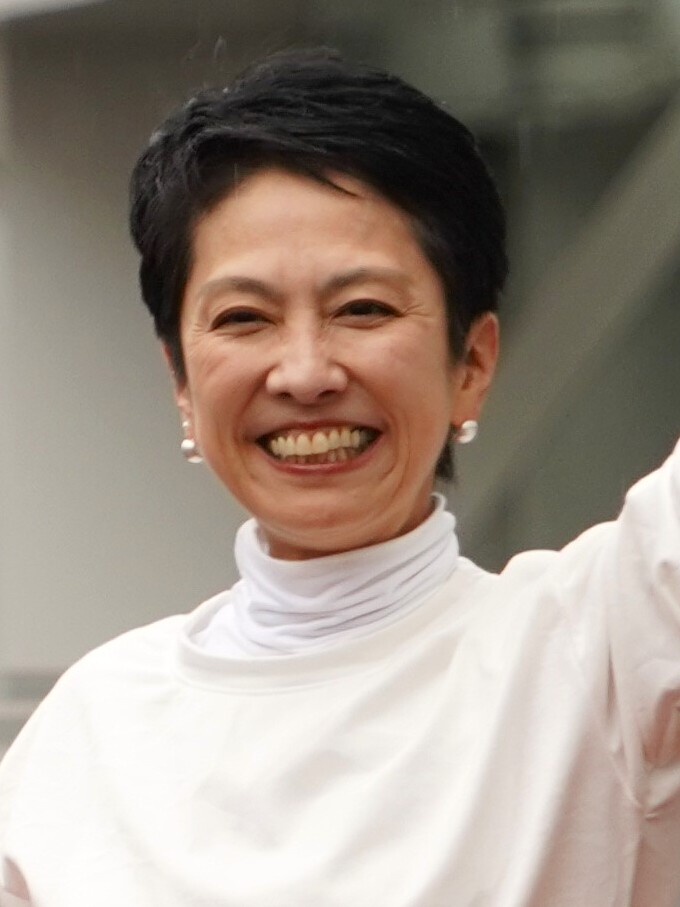
| Candidate | Yuriko Koike | Shinji Ishimaru | Renhō |
| Party | Independent | Independent | Independent |
| Popular vote | 2,918,015 | 1,658,363 | 1,283,262 |
| Percentage | 42.8% | 24.3% | 18.8% |
| Supported by | Tomin First, LDP, Komeito, DPFP | — | CDP, JCP, SDP |
- Election results by municipalities.
Governor before election
Yuriko Koike
Independent
Elected Governor
Yuriko Koike
Independent

The 2024 Tokyo gubernatorial election took place on 7 July 2024 to elect the Governor of Tokyo. Incumbent Yuriko Koike was re-elected for a third term, albeit at a reduced share of the votes compared to her 2016 election and 2020 re-election. Shinji Ishimaru, the former Mayor of Akitakata, exceeded expectations to place second behind Koike. Meanwhile, lawmaker Renhō, who was endorsed by the main left-wing opposition parties and was widely considered Koike's main opponent leading up to election day, significantly underperformed her polling and placed third.

Ishimaru's success has been attributed to his extensive use of social media platforms for campaigning, winning independents and the youth vote, while Renhō's poor performance has been linked to her collaboration with the Japanese Communist Party (JCP), resulting in alienation among independent and moderate voters.

The election took place simultaneously with by-elections to replace 9 vacant seats in the Tokyo Metropolitan Assembly.

== Background ==
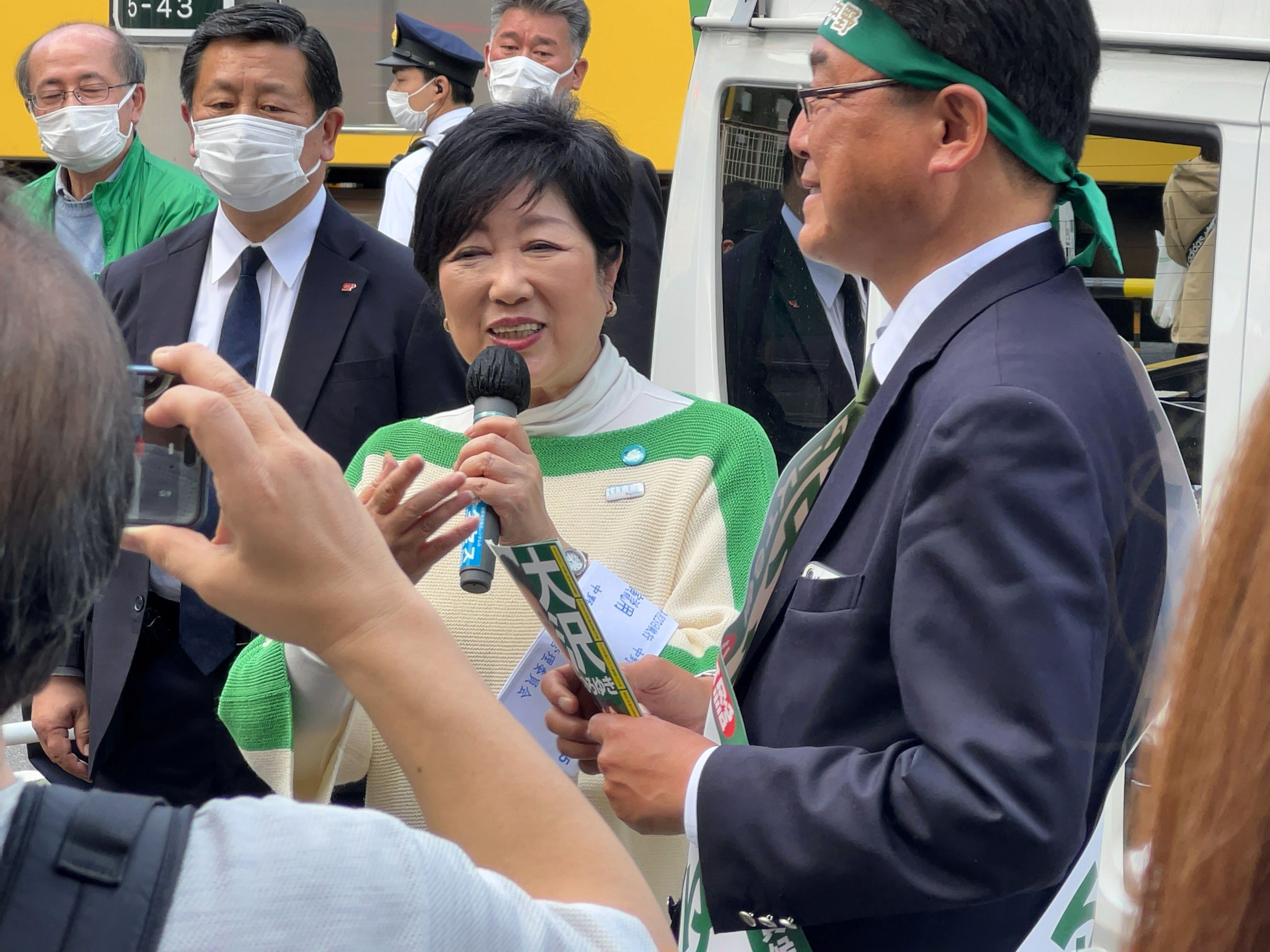
Incumbent Governor Yuriko Koike (pictured in April 2023), sought a third consecutive term.

Incumbent Governor Yuriko Koike ran for re-election to a third term, receiving the endorsement of the Democratic Party For the People and the regional party Tomin First no Kai, which Koike founded and currently serves as their special advisor. The Liberal Democratic Party and Komeito, who previously refused to support Koike in 2016 and 2020, endorsed her at their own initiative.

Koike's main opponent was expected to be lawmaker Renhō, who received the endorsement of the main left-wing opposition parties; the Constitutional Democratic Party, the Japanese Communist Party and the Social Democratic Party. Shinji Ishimaru, the former Mayor of Akitakata, and Toshio Tamogami, the former Chief of Staff of the Japan Air Self-Defense Force ran without the support of any major parties. Free Education For All and Sanseitō instructed its members to vote freely, while Nippon Ishin no Kai and Reiwa Shinsengumi did not field or endorse a candidate.

Minor candidates included ultranationalist and anti-Korean political activist Makoto Sakurai, who ran under the Japan First Party, and Atsuhiko Kurokawa, who was arrested in June 2024 for alleged election interference and sabotage during a House of Representatives by-election in April 2024, who ran under the Tsubasa Party.

56 candidates filed to run in the election, with nearly half of them belonging to Takashi Tachibana's NHK Party, the highest number of registered candidates to date. Media outlets have described the high number of candidates as being a result of the election becoming known as a forum for self-promotion and publicity stunts.

== Campaign ==
The main issues in the election included declining birth rates, environmental laws, redevelopment of the Meiji Jingu Gaien area, and the use of projection mapping on the Tokyo Metropolitan Government Building.

Incumbent Koike utilized her experience to garner support, delivering occasional speeches throughout Tokyo. Renhō focused on street rallies and anti-LDP sentiment, typically making two speeches per day. Renhō's campaign has been noted for its progressivism, advocating for LGBT inclusive policies, climate action, and intergenerational equity, which appeals to younger voters. Shinji Ishimaru, the 41 year old who previously served as the Mayor of Akitakata, has used social media to increase his name recognition, running a populist campaign by advertising himself as a political outsider. Like Renhō, he utilized street campaigning, but instead moves from one speech location to another in 30-minute intervals to appeal for support. His campaign recruited about 5,000 volunteers to spread his activities through social media; he also has capitalized on anti-LDP sentiment. Tamogami appealed to conservatives, making speeches in front of the Defense Ministry building, having a strong stance in support of the controversial Yasukuni Shrine and being opposed to immigration. Although Sanseitō did not endorse Tamogami, its leader Sohei Kamiya campaigned alongside him.

The four main candidates took part in several forums and debates. A joint press conference hosted by ANN was held between Koike, Renhō, Ishimaru, and Tamogami on 19 June. The four participated in a public debate hosted by Junior Chamber International (JCI) that was held on 24 June.

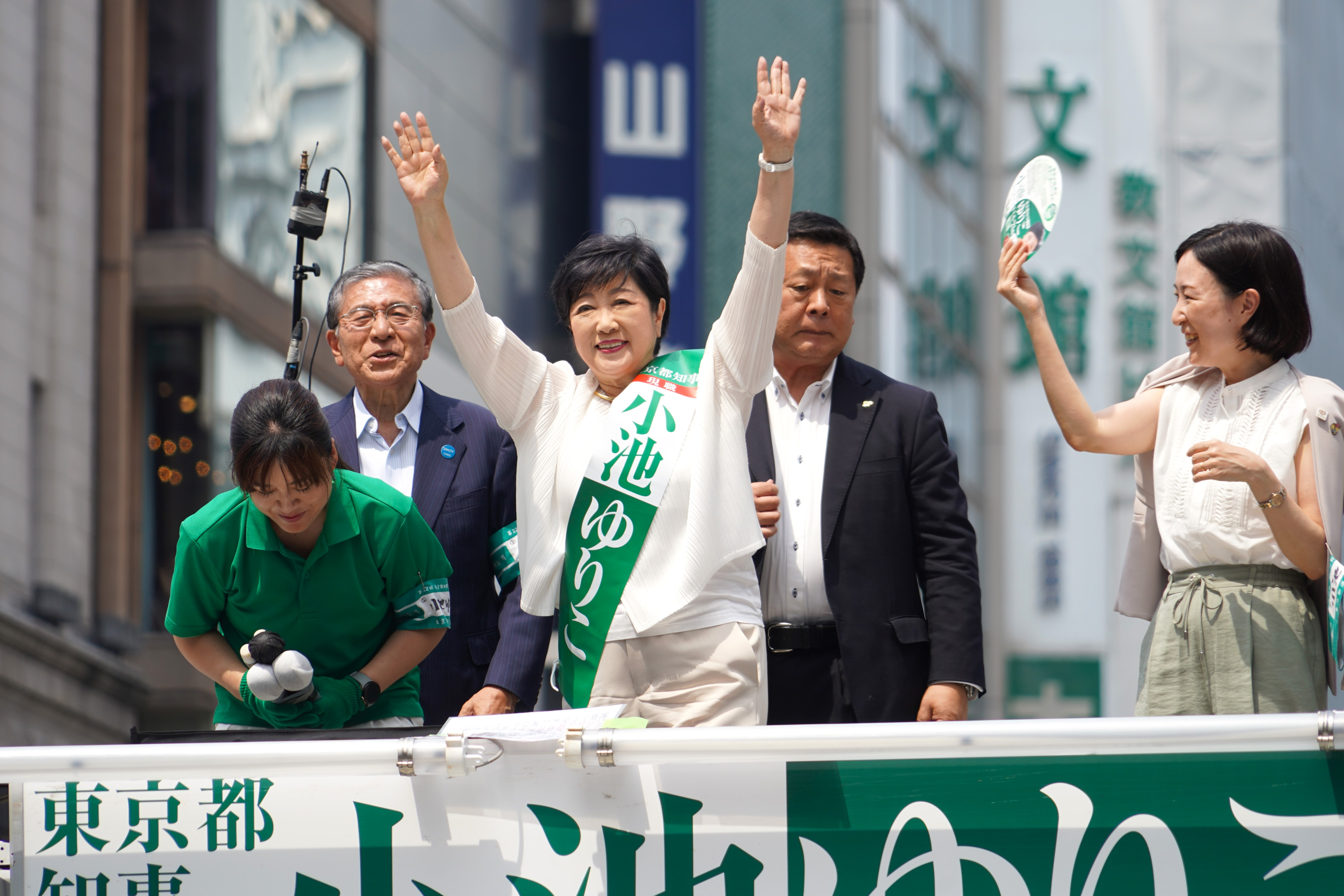
Yuriko Koike giving a speech at Ginza.

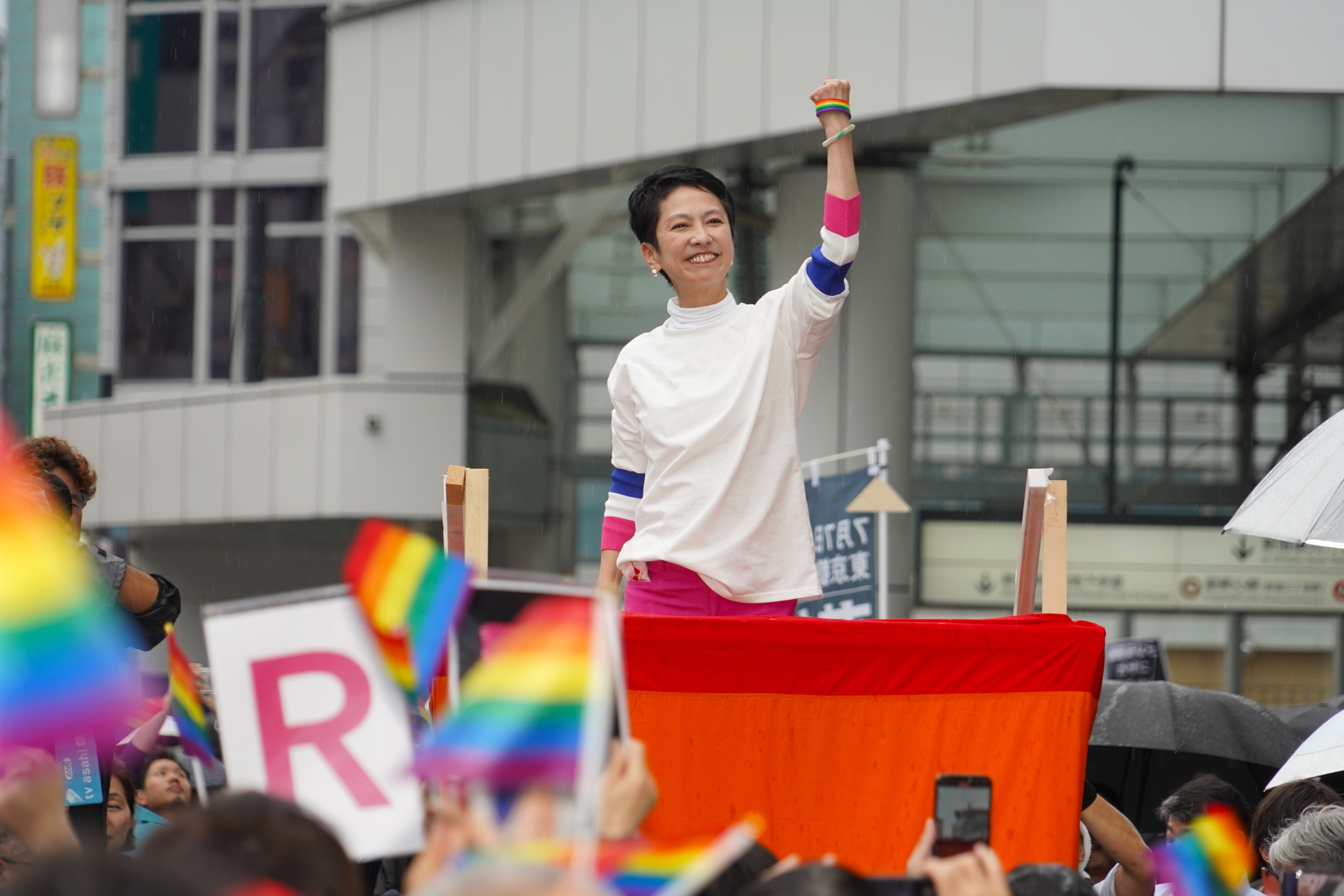
Renhō giving a speech in front of Shinjuku Station.

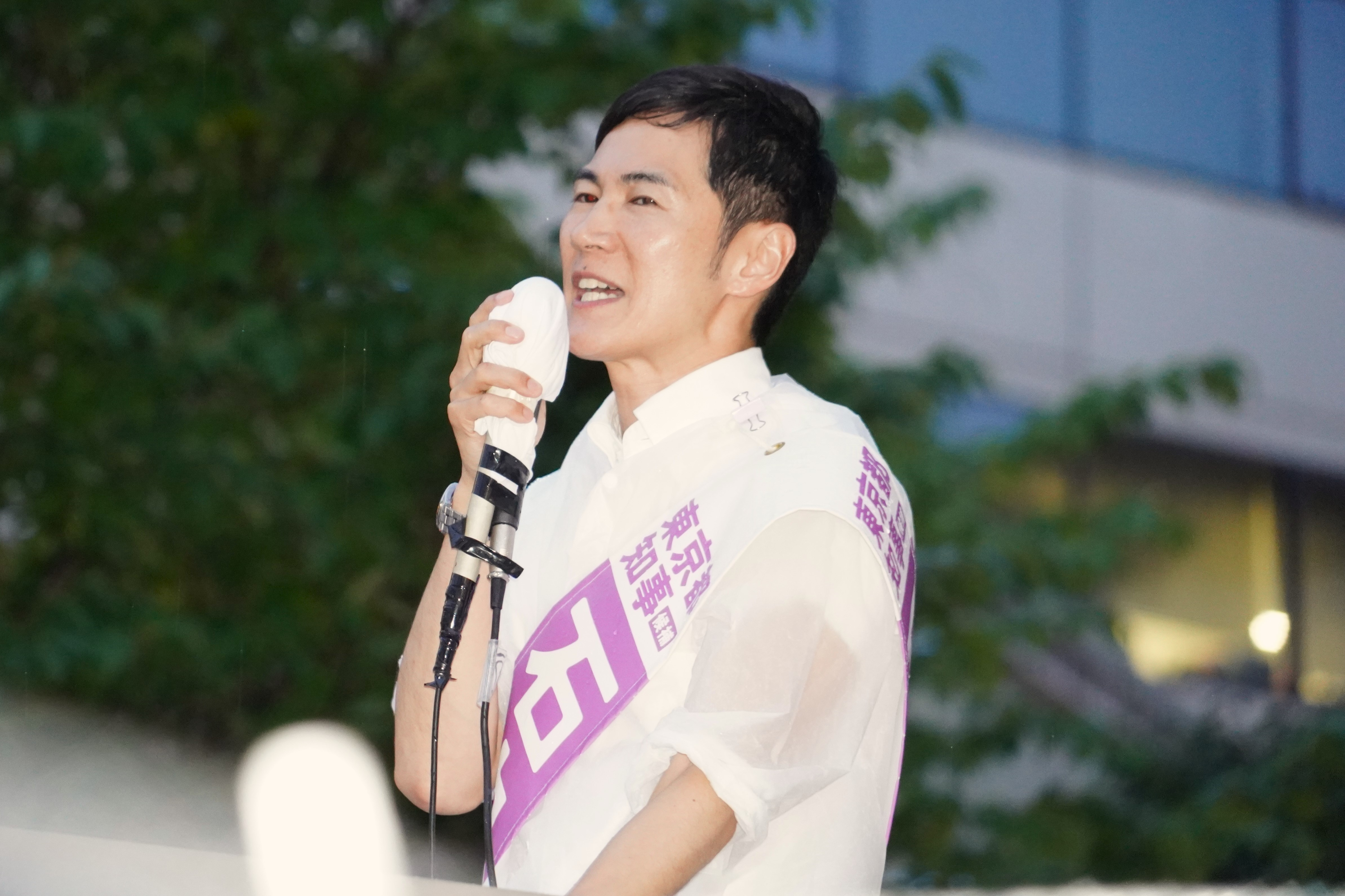
Shinji Ishimaru giving a speech in front of Yurakucho Itocia.

== Controversies ==
=== Poster jacking ===
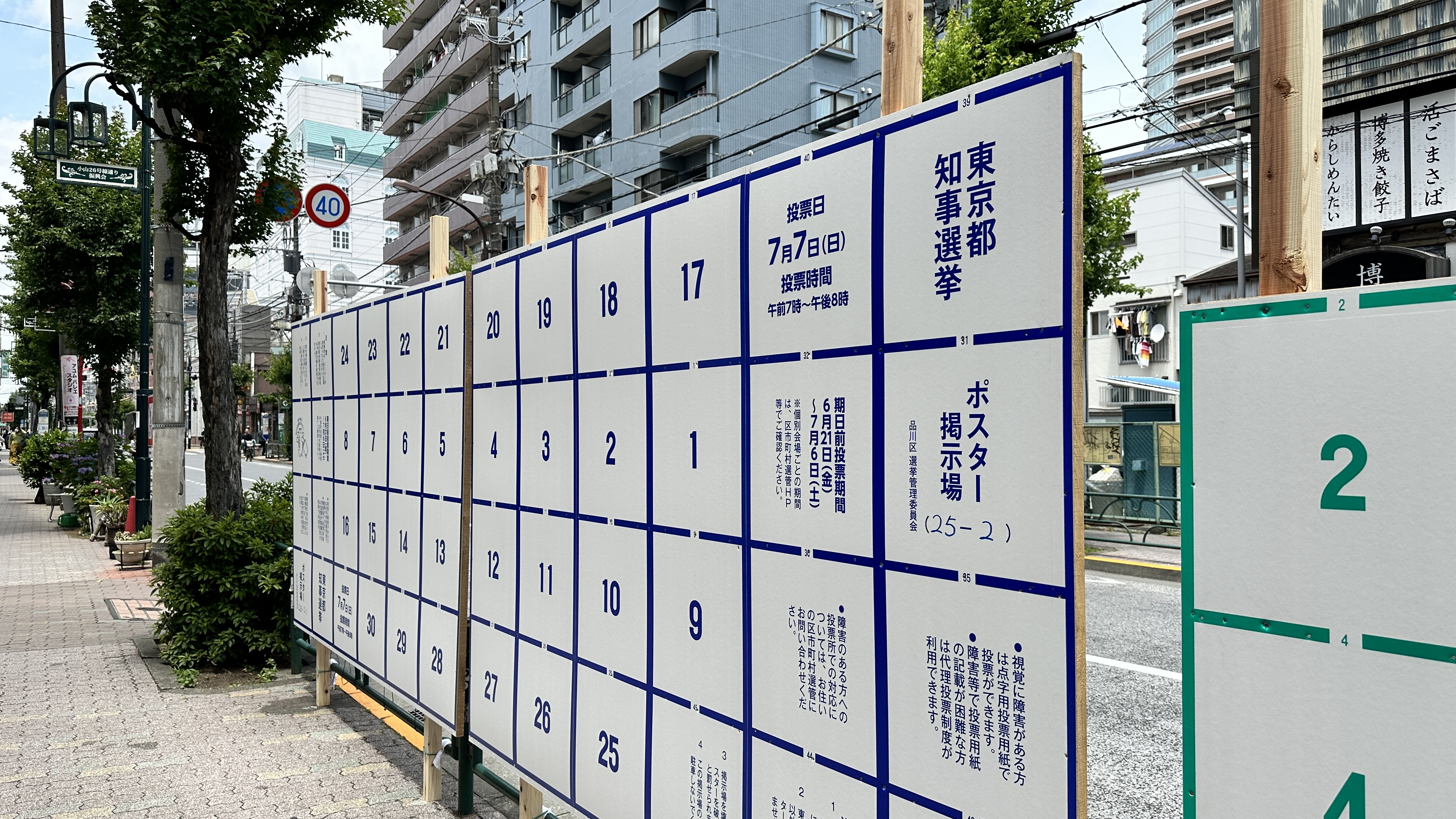
Tokyo's election boards. Each candidate is allocated one slot to display their poster

The NHK Party led by Takashi Tachibana launched a political stunt named "Operation Tokyo Gubernatorial Election Poster Display Jacking." Filing dozens of candidates for the election under their party, Tachibana was able to gain access to approximately 14,000 campaign posters throughout Tokyo. By donating to the party, donors were able to put up a poster of their choice in place of the party's posters. The Ministry of Internal Affairs and Communications stated that there are no restrictions on the content of campaign posters, except for false information, content related to other candidates' campaigns, and content that violates laws. Despite this, experts raised concerns about the legal loopholes, and an online petition opposing the poster jacking gathered more than 20,000 signatures.

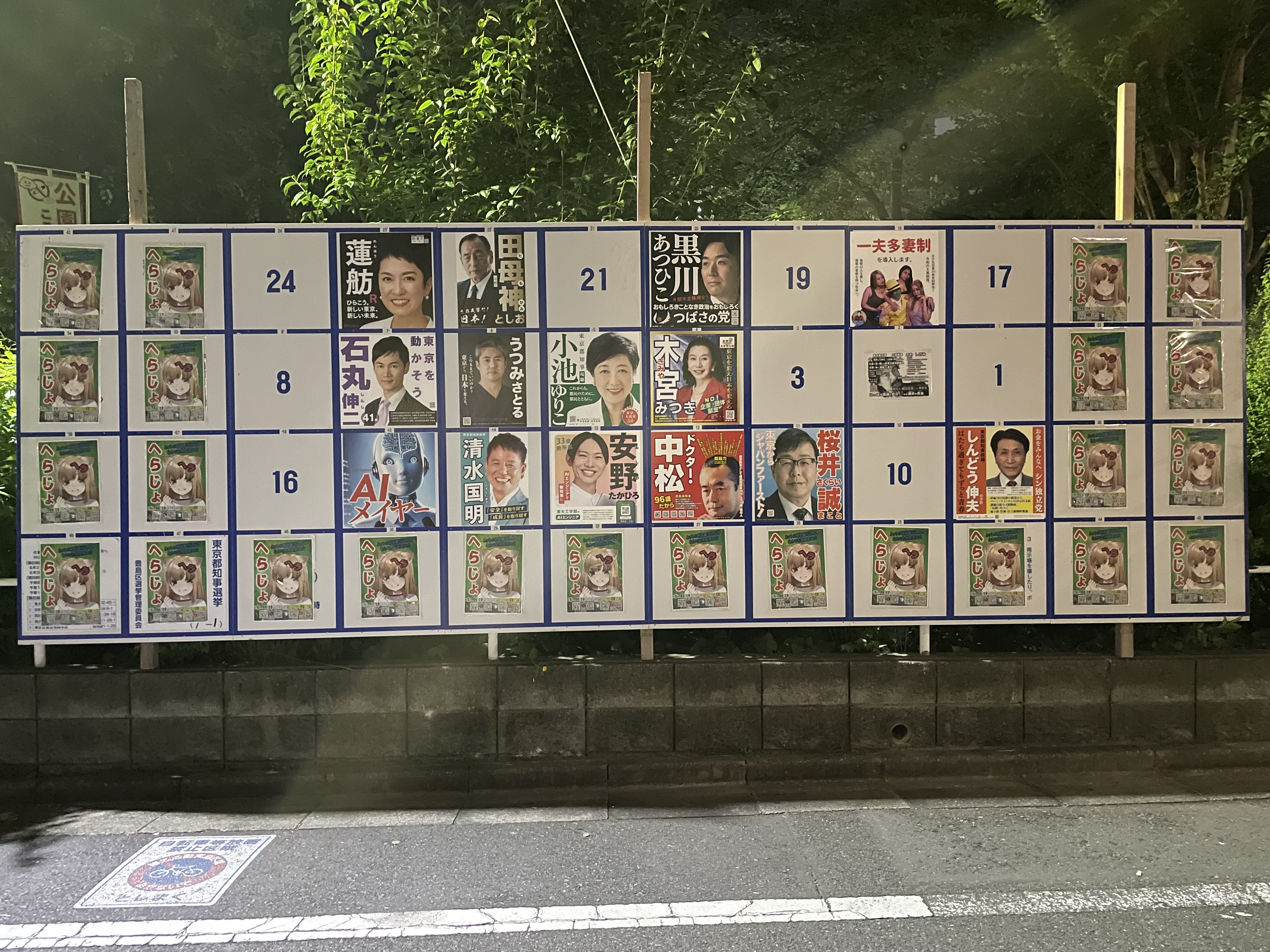
One of the election boards taken over by the NHK Party's "jacking."

On June 22, the Tokyo Metropolitan Police Department warned the party about posters in Shibuya Ward advertising a women-only adult entertainment establishment, potentially violating the Entertainment and Amusement Business Act. Tachibana removed the posters in response. Additionally, posters in the same Ward featured illustrations of deceased actor Haruma Miura, leading to a protest from his former talent agency, Amuse. The donor responsible for the posters admitted to putting them up without permission, leading to Tachibana apologizing and removing the posters.

The Tokyo Metropolitan Election Commission received over 1,000 complaints from residents regarding the posters between June 20 and June 21. Secretary-General of the LDP Toshimitsu Motegi expressed the need to consider revising the Public Offices Election Act to address the poster jacking. Komeito leader Natsuo Yamaguchi, CDP Secretary-General Katsuya Okada, DPFP leader Yuichiro Tamaki, JCP Secretary-General Akira Koike, as well as Governor of Osaka Hirofumi Yoshimura expressed similar views.

=== Perennial candidates ===
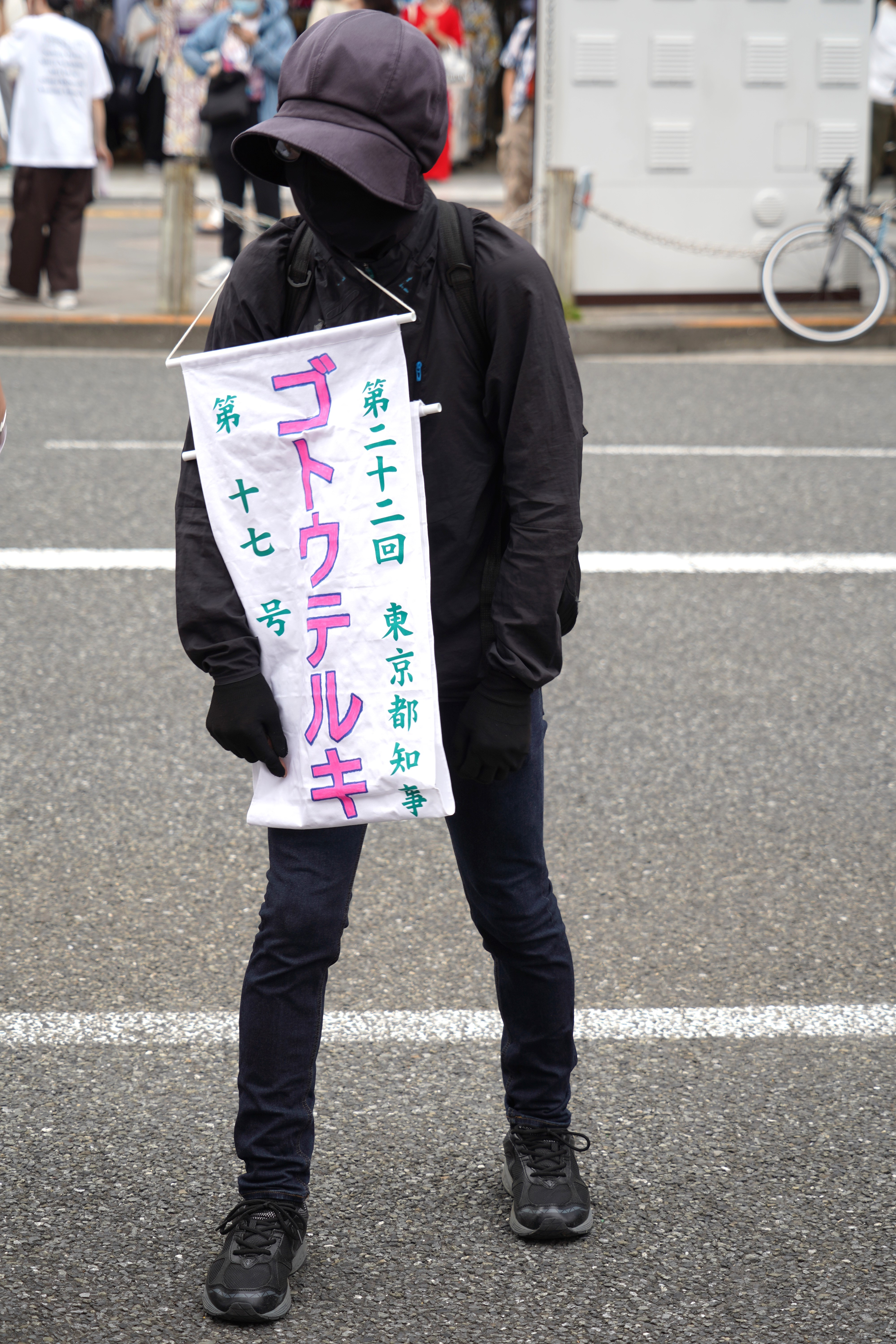
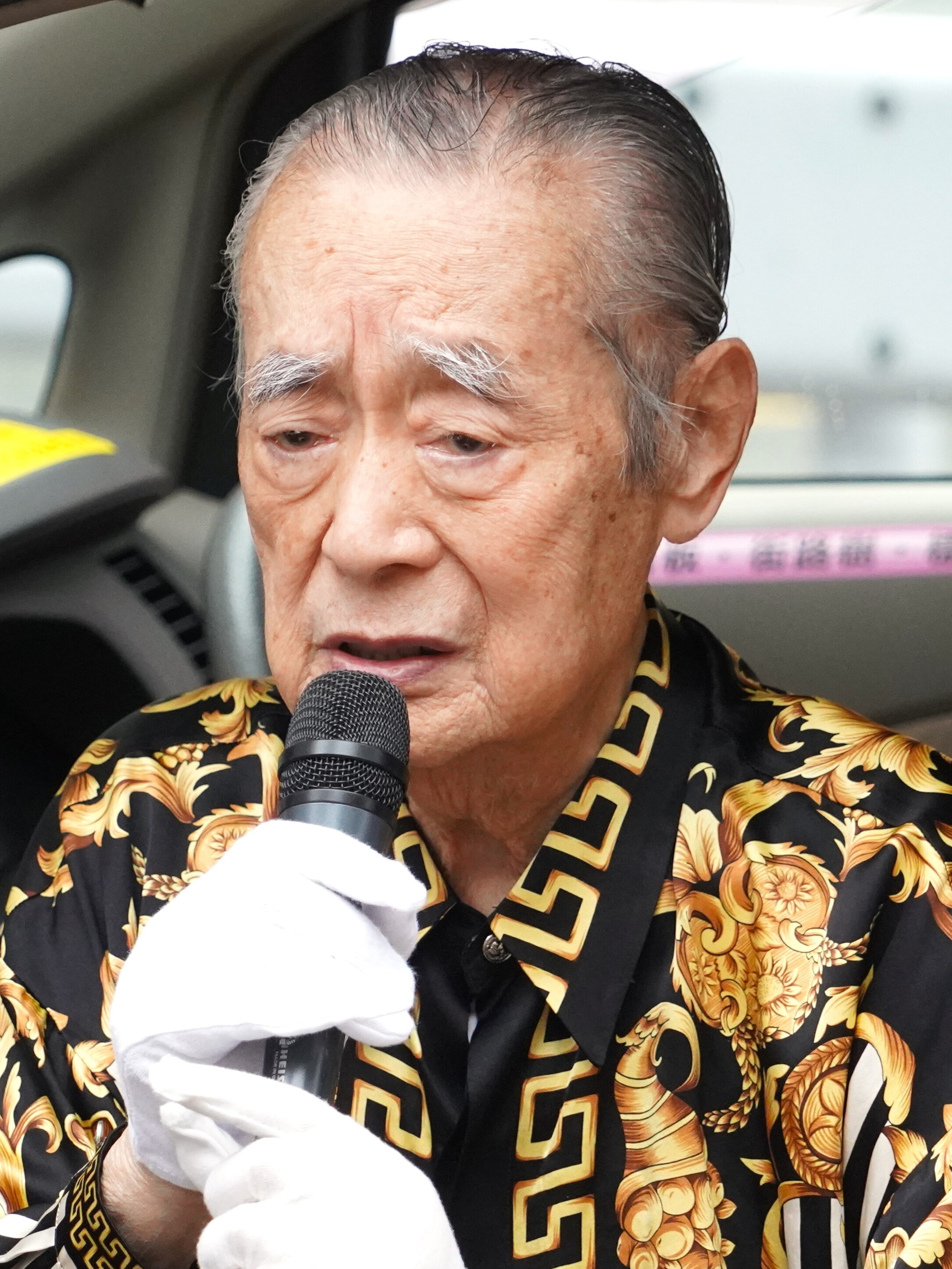
Perennial candidates Teruki Gotō (left) and Yoshiro Nakamatsu (right).

The election gained international attention due to the large amount of joke parties and perennial candidates participating, which included 96-year-old inventor Yoshiro Nakamatsu, internet comedian 'AI Mayor', Yusuke Kawai, the self-proclaimed "Joker of Japan" who gained controversy for putting explicit campaign posters with a fully nude image of a gyaru model, which was later removed by the Metropolitan Police Department, and a candidate from the 'Poker Party' who advocates for economic and political reforms through the card game. Governor of Tottori Shinji Hirai said in a remark to the Tottori prefectural assembly that the influx of joke and perennial candidates in the election showed that “democracy is at risk of collapse.”

In Japan, political broadcasts airs on NHK to provide a platform for all candidates participating in an election to present their policies and appeal to voters. Each candidate is given a set amount of time to speak, and the broadcasts are scheduled at various times to reach a wide audience. In addition to serious policy discussions, political broadcasts often features appearances by joke and perennial candidates who use this platform to engage in unconventional or questionable activities. During one of the broadcasts for the election, female candidate Airi Uchino was seen stripping in the middle of her broadcast. A separate candidate was seen yelling at the sign language interpreter that accompanied him during the broadcast, causing controversy.

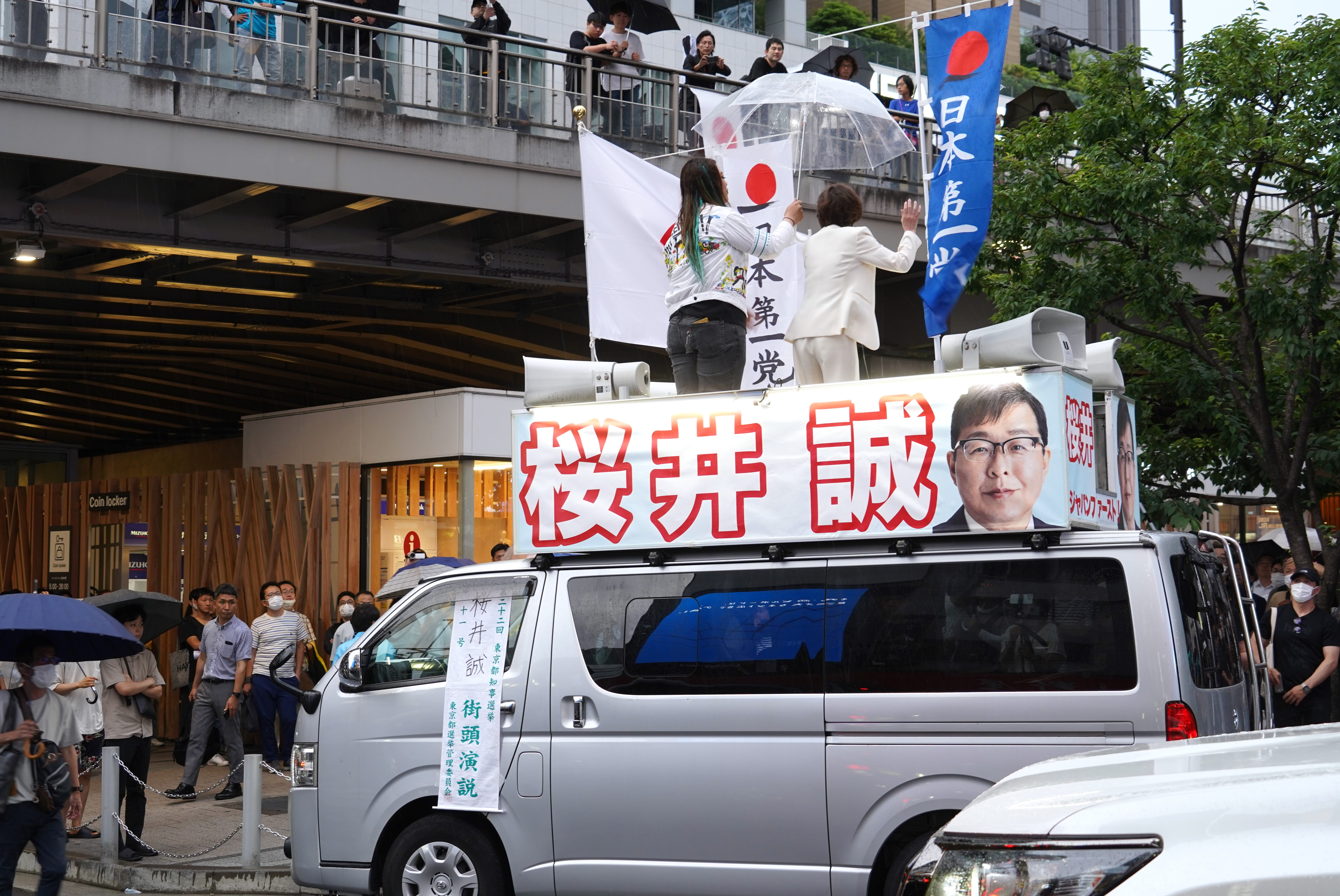
Makoto Sakurai's campaign vehicle in front of Shinjuku Station.

=== Xenophobic comments ===
Makoto Sakurai, the Japan First Party candidate, has long been noted for his xenophobia, founding the anti-Zainichi Korean organization Zaitokukai in 2007. During a campaign speech in front of Ikebukuro Station, Sakurai accused a 24-hour Chinese store located near the station of hosting "400 Chinese mafias," claiming that the Metropolitan Police Department has confirmed the information, however, this was later denied. In the same campaign speech, Sakurai further claimed that public safety in Ikebukuro is "being threatened due to the rise in Chinese immigrants".

=== Assassination threats ===
Koike and Renhō's campaign headquarters received a series of threatening letters with death and bomb threats. Both campaigns have filed damage reports with the Tokyo Metropolitan Police Department and the incident is being investigated on suspicion of intimidation.

- On June 23, a fax was sent to Renhō's campaign office with the message "I will stab her with a knife and kill her." The fax also contained statements such as "I have obtained sulfuric acid" and "I will plant a bomb and detonate it on June 24th."
- On June 24, a letter almost identical to the fax sent to the Renhō campaign was sent to the Toshima Ward office of Tomin First no Kai, the local party which endorsed Koike, stating that they had "splashed sulfuric acid" and "planted explosives."

Additionally, a death threat was delivered to the female model behind Kawai's explicit campaign posters, resulting in Kawai cancelling his planned campaign speeches and political gaffes.

== Results ==
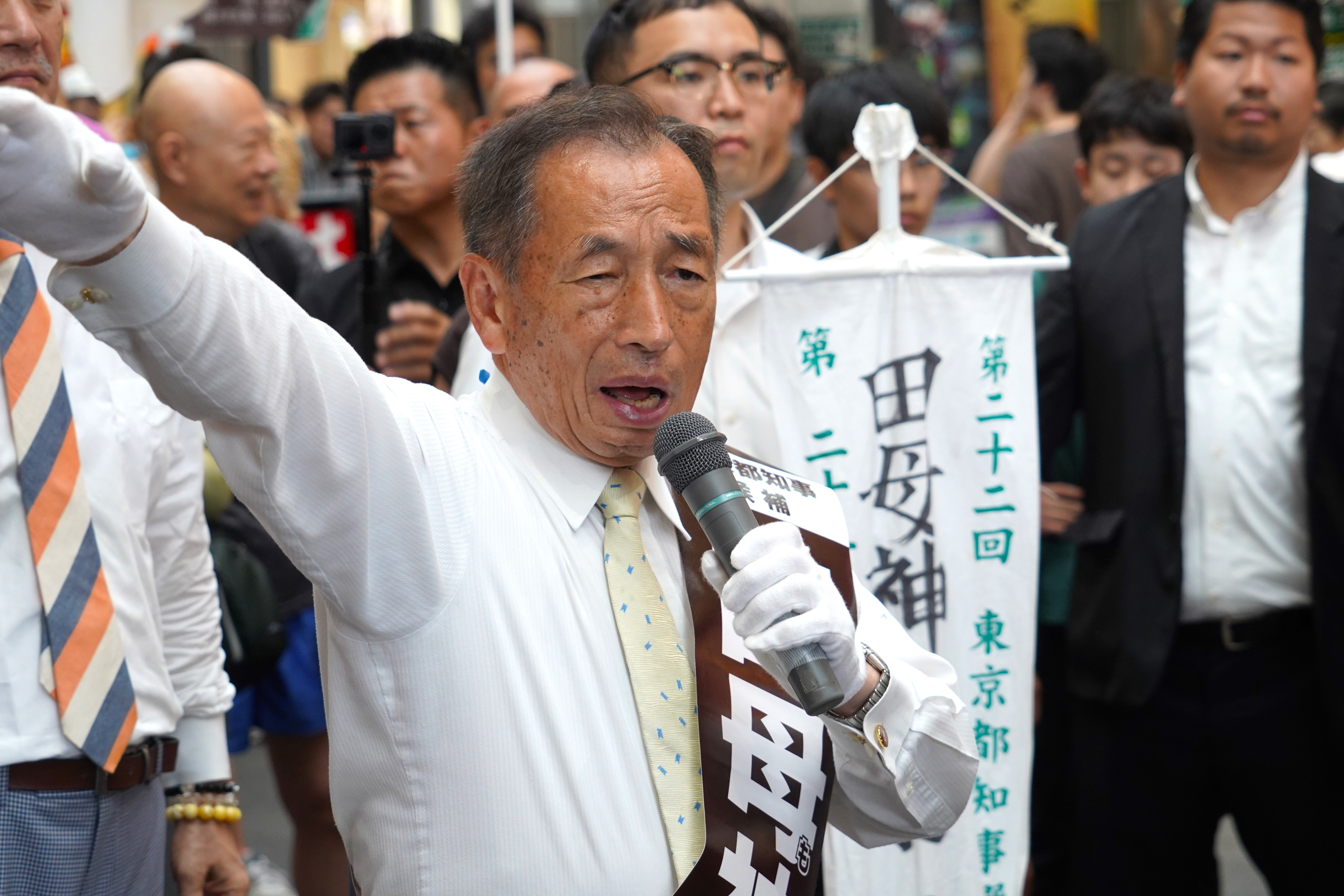
Despite receiving generous media coverage, Toshio Tamogami only received 3.9% of the popular vote.

An exit poll conducted by NHK was published at the end of voting at 20:00. The poll showed Koike winning with approximately 40% of the votes, with Ishimaru unexpectedly placing second with approximately 20% of the votes, followed by Renhō and Tamogami. Ishimaru surprised many by securing second place behind Koike with 1,658,363 votes, capturing 24.3% of the total vote share. His unexpected success highlighted his growing popularity among independents and the youth. In contrast, Renhō, initially seen as Koike's main rival, underperformed with 1,283,262 votes, amounting to 18.8% of the votes cast.

A separate exit poll conducted by the Yomiuri Shimbun and Nippon TV showed 67% of LDP and 77% of Komeito members voted for Koike, while 59% of CDP and 71% of JCP members voted for Renhō. In addition, 19% of CDP and 10% of JCP members voted for Koike, while Ishimaru won over 20% of LDP and 18% of CDP members. Meanwhile, 36% of independents voted for Ishimaru, 31% for Koike, and 17% for Renhō.

According to NHK and The Asahi Shimbun exit polls, Ishimaru received support in the 40% to 20% range among those in their teens and twenties, while Koike was supported in the upper 20% range, giving Ishimaru a lead of over 10 points. Among voters in their 30s and 40s, both Koike and Ishimaru had support in the 30% range. However, among those in their 50s, Koike's support reached the 40% range, and for those over 60, both Koike and Renho saw an increase in their percentages. In the previous election, Koike was the most popular across all age groups. This time, Ishimaru led among 18- and 19-year-olds and those in their 20s and 30s, while Koike remained the most popular among those in their 40s to 70s and over 80.

Tokyo gubernatorial election, 2024
| Party | Candidate | Votes | % | ±% |
|---|---|---|---|---|
| Independent (Note: Supported by Tomin First, LDP, Komeito, DPFP) | Yuriko Koike (incumbent) | 2,918,015 | 42.8% | ▼16.9 |
| Independent | Shinji Ishimaru | 1,658,363 | 24.3% | New |
| Independent (Note: Supported by CDP, JCP, SDP) | Renhō | 1,283,262 | 18.8% | New |
| Independent | Toshio Tamogami | 267,699 | 3.9% | New |
| Independent | Takahiro Anno | 154,638 | 2.3% | New |
| Citizens' Political Association | Satoru Utsumi | 121,715 | 1.8% | New |
| Independent | Akane Himasora | 110,196 | 1.6% | New |
| Independent | Yukito Ishimaru | 96,222 | 1.4% | New |
| Japan First | Makoto Sakurai | 83,600 | 1.2% | ▼1.7 |
| Association for a Safe Future with Kuniaki Shimizu and Tokyo | Kuniaki Shimizu | 38,054 | 0.6% | New |
| Independent | Yoshiro Nakamatsu | 23,825 | 0.3% | New |
| Independent | Yukio Yamato | 9,685 | 0.1% | New |
| Independent | Hiroshi Kobayashi | 7,408 | 0.1% | New |
| Love & Peace Party | Teruki Gotō | 5,419 | 0.1% | ▼0.26 |
| Future Party | Mitsuki Kimiya | 4,874 | 0.1% | New |
| Independent | Shigeyuki Fukumoto | 3,245 | 0.03% | New |
| AI Party | AI Mayor | 2,761 | 0.02% | New |
| Independent | Hisao Naito | 2,339 | 0.02% | ▼0.05 |
| Anti-NHK | Midori Yokoyama | 2,174 | 0.02% | New |
| Watch My Cute Political Broadcast | Airi Uchino | 2,152 | 0.02% | New |
| Association to Increase Voter Turnout and Joker Members of Parliament | Yuusuke Kawai | 2,035 | 0.02% | New |
| Independent | Masanori Kougo | 1,951 | 0.02% | New |
| Tsubasa | Atsuhiko Kurokawa | 1,833 | 0.02% | New |
| Prevent Medical Kume Kei Victims Association and Soka Gakkai Eradication Party | Mariko Kuwahara | 1,747 | 0.02% | New |
| Anti-NHK | Katsuya Fukunaga | 1,281 | 0.01% | New |
| Independent | Shou Nomaguchi | 1,240 | 0.01% | New |
| Independent | Shigemi Sawa | 1,232 | 0.01% | New |
| Independent | Nobuo Ushikubo | 1,153 | 0.01% | New |
| Independent | Ken Komatsu | 894 | 0.008% | New |
| Anti-NHK | Shinichi Endou | 882 | 0.008% | New |
| Anti-NHK | Taizou Ninomiya | 833 | 0.007% | New |
| Independent | Takemoto Hideyuki | 812 | 0.007% | New |
| Neo Shogunate Akinori Party | Akinori Shougunmiman | 792 | 0.007% | New |
| Independent | Kouki Onodera | 759 | 0.007% | New |
| Anti-NHK | Shinichi Yamada | 691 | 0.006% | New |
| Anti-NHK | Yoshitaka Kimura | 676 | 0.006% | New |
| Independent | Nobuo Shindo | 669 | 0.006% | New |
| Anti-NHK | Tomoya Nakae | 612 | 0.005% | New |
| Anti-NHK | Hideaki Katou | 588 | 0.005% | New |
| Conqueror Party | Takuji Kagata | 578 | 0.005% | New |
| Independent | Kenichirou Katou | 572 | 0.005% | New |
| Independent | Jin Hokari | 560 | 0.005% | New |
| Anti-NHK | Taichi Maeda | 521 | 0.005% | New |
| Anti-NHK | Atsushi Kusao | 481 | 0.004% | New |
| Anti-NHK | Shirubi Fukuhara | 466 | 0.004% | New |
| Anti-NHK | Takashi Takeuchi | 446 | 0.004% | New |
| Independent | Ayumi Ozeki | 417 | 0.004% | New |
| Anti-NHK | Hiroaki Inubuse | 371 | 0.003% | New |
| Nuclear Fusion Party | Yasufumi Kuwashima | 361 | 0.003% | New |
| Anti-NHK | Yoshiharu Matsuo | 351 | 0.003% | New |
| Party to Impeach Five Supreme Court Judges | Makoto Furuta | 343 | 0.003% | New |
| Anti-NHK | Yumeto Funahashi | 329 | 0.003% | New |
| Anti-NHK | Youichi Miwa | 306 | 0.003% | New |
| Anti-NHK | Daisaku Tsumura | 302 | 0.003% | New |
| Anti-NHK | Shunsuke Minami | 297 | 0.003% | New |
| Anti-NHK | Muneyuki Jouraku | 211 | 0.002% | New |
| Turnout | | 11,349,278 | 60.56% | ▲5.62 |

=== Results by municipality ===
| Municipality | Yuriko Koike | | Shinji Ishimaru | | Renhō | | Toshio Tamogami | |
| Municipality | Votes | % | Votes | % | Votes | % | Votes | % |
|---|---|---|---|---|---|---|---|---|
| Total | 2,918,015 | 42.8% | 1,658,363 | 24.3% | 1,283,262 | 18.8% | 267,699 | 3.9% |
| Chiyoda | 13,490 | 39.5% | 8,818 | 25.8% | 5,300 | 15.5% | 1,701 | 5.0% |
| Chūō | 36,927 | 40.8% | 24,890 | 27.5% | 12,910 | 14.3% | 4,189 | 4.6% |
| Minato | 43,787 | 38.3% | 30,863 | 27.0% | 18,725 | 16.4% | 5,721 | 5.0% |
| Shinjuku | 63,036 | 40.1% | 39,072 | 24.8% | 29,762 | 18.9% | 7,554 | 4.8% |
| Bunkyō | 49,077 | 39.7% | 28,009 | 22.7% | 23,924 | 19.4% | 5,075 | 4.1% |
| Taitō | 42,228 | 40.1% | 27,357 | 26.0% | 17,887 | 17.0% | 4,831 | 4.6% |
| Sumida | 61,337 | 43.1% | 35,370 | 24.9% | 22,918 | 16.1% | 5,715 | 4.0% |
| Kōtō | 110,457 | 42.9% | 68,192 | 26.5% | 44,724 | 17.4% | 9,983 | 3.9% |
| Shinagawa | 83,867 | 40.9% | 55,984 | 27.3% | 35,095 | 17.1% | 8,393 | 4.1% |
| Meguro | 50,269 | 36.4% | 37,681 | 27.3% | 28,445 | 20.6% | 5,587 | 4.0% |
| Ōta | 154,309 | 42.7% | 93,235 | 25.8% | 62,928 | 17.4% | 14,828 | 4.1% |
| Setagaya | 180,766 | 37.7% | 134,587 | 28.1% | 98,771 | 20.6% | 19,447 | 4.1% |
| Shibuya | 39,959 | 35.1% | 31,430 | 27.6% | 23,738 | 20.9% | 5,253 | 4.6% |
| Nakano | 64,505 | 38.5% | 39,314 | 23.5% | 34,186 | 20.4% | 7,480 | 4.5% |
| Suginami | 113,484 | 37.8% | 76,796 | 25.6% | 66,045 | 22.0% | 12,333 | 4.1% |
| Toshima | 58,590 | 42.7% | 32,210 | 23.5% | 23,677 | 17.3% | 6,048 | 4.4% |
| Kita | 77,799 | 44.3% | 36,453 | 20.7% | 32,304 | 18.4% | 6,971 | 4.0% |
| Arakawa | 45,373 | 44.6% | 23,530 | 23.1% | 17,136 | 16.8% | 4,113 | 4.0% |
| Itabashi | 117,802 | 43.2% | 66,658 | 24.4% | 49,982 | 18.3% | 11,147 | 4.1% |
| Nerima | 164,174 | 43.8% | 86,758 | 23.2% | 68,655 | 18.3% | 14,577 | 3.9% |
| Adachi | 148,432 | 48.0% | 70,901 | 22.9% | 51,903 | 16.8% | 11,732 | 3.8% |
| Katsushika | 98,479 | 45.7% | 52,929 | 24.6% | 36,746 | 17.1% | 8,467 | 3.9% |
| Edogawa | 143,930 | 46.6% | 73,963 | 23.9% | 48,505 | 15.7% | 12,401 | 4.0% |
| Hachiōji | 123,401 | 45.8% | 62,479 | 23.2% | 53,862 | 20.0% | 8,862 | 3.3% |
| Tachikawa | 41,566 | 46.4% | 19,021 | 21.3% | 16,719 | 18.7% | 3,252 | 3.6% |
| Musashino | 29,616 | 37.4% | 20,395 | 25.8% | 18,415 | 23.3% | 2,997 | 3.8% |
| Mitaka | 39,009 | 39.2% | 25,695 | 25.8% | 21,794 | 21.9% | 3,642 | 3.7% |
| Ome | 32,556 | 51.9% | 11,908 | 19.0% | 11,348 | 18.1% | 2,038 | 3.2% |
| Fuchū | 56,567 | 43.7% | 31,567 | 24.4% | 24,895 | 19.2% | 4,884 | 3.8% |
| Akishima | 26,247 | 47.6% | 11,705 | 21.2% | 10,266 | 18.6% | 2,020 | 3.7% |
| Chōfu | 51,795 | 41.4% | 32,874 | 26.3% | 24,810 | 19.8% | 4,499 | 3.6% |
| Machida | 97,713 | 45.6% | 46,230 | 21.6% | 41,389 | 19.3% | 7,431 | 3.5% |
| Koganei | 26,077 | 40.3% | 14,282 | 22.0% | 14,372 | 22.2% | 2,233 | 3.4% |
| Kodaira | 43,212 | 43.9% | 21,800 | 22.1% | 19,929 | 20.2% | 3,407 | 3.5% |
| Hino | 41,940 | 43.7% | 21,877 | 22.8% | 19,377 | 20.2% | 3,329 | 3.5% |
| Higashiyamato | 34,410 | 45.8% | 16,009 | 21.3% | 15,433 | 20.5% | 2,690 | 3.6% |
| Hamura | 12,522 | 49.1% | 5,462 | 21.4% | 4,689 | 18.4% | 747 | 2.9% |
| Akiruno | 19,995 | 51.9% | 7,537 | 19.6% | 7,059 | 18.3% | 1,184 | 3.1% |
| Nishitokyo | 45,352 | 43.1% | 24,204 | 23.0% | 21,530 | 20.5% | 3,890 | 3.7% |
| Mizuho | 8,078 | 55.9% | 2,479 | 17.2% | 2,227 | 15.4% | 464 | 3.2% |
| Hinode | 4,467 | 55.5% | 1,425 | 17.7% | 1,437 | 17.8% | 232 | 2.9% |
| Hinohara | 731 | 61.4% | 146 | 12.4% | 196 | 16.5% | 24 | 2.0% |
| Okutama | 1,758 | 68.0% | 331 | 12.8% | 345 | 13.4% | 33 | 1.3% |
| Ōshima | 2,065 | 56.0% | 617 | 16.8% | 643 | 17.4% | 89 | 2.4% |
| To-shima | 130 | 62.2% | 42 | 20.1% | 23 | 11.0% | 3 | 1.4% |
| Niijima | 979 | 68.8% | 224 | 15.8% | 117 | 8.2% | 36 | 2.5% |
| Kozushima | 614 | 63.2% | 133 | 13.8% | 110 | 11.3% | 18 | 1.9% |
| Miyake | 755 | 61.5% | 213 | 17.4% | 146 | 11.9% | 24 | 2.0% |
| Mikurajima | 82 | 44.6% | 37 | 20.6% | 39 | 21.2% | 5 | 2.7% |
| Hachijō | 2,501 | 64.6% | 540 | 14.0% | 500 | 12.9% | 110 | 2.8% |
| Aogashima | 72 | 69.9% | 18 | 17.5% | 9 | 8.7% | 2 | 1.9% |
| Ogasawara | 566 | 43.5% | 338 | 26.1% | 182 | 14.0% | 61 | 4.7% |

== Aftermath ==
After the release of the exit poll projecting her victory, Koike made a speech thanking her supporters for voting for her. Ishimaru, who exceeded expectations and placed second behind Koike, said in his concession speech that he is thinking of entering national politics in the future, hinting a candidacy for the Hiroshima 1st district of the House of Representatives, the constituency of prime minister Fumio Kishida. Renhō said the reason behind her underperformance in the election was her "lack of ability." However, she said that she wishes to remain in politics and continue her career as an opposition politician.

Some media outlets and politicians such as Takashi Tachibana have suggested that Yukito Ishimaru, who placed eighth with 96,222 votes, received these votes primarily because he shares the same surname as Shinji Ishimaru, resulting in some confused voters voting for Yukito. It is argued that Yukito would not have achieved this vote count given his low media coverage and lack of popularity.

== Simultaneous by-elections ==
By-elections for the Tokyo Metropolitan Assembly were held simultaneously with the gubernatorial election to fill the vacancies of nine seats.

The results of the by-elections saw Tomin First no Kai winning three seats, the Liberal Democratic Party winning two, the Constitutional Democratic Party winning one and independent candidates winning the remaining three seats.

=== Kōtō Ward ===
LDP Assembly member Ikki Yamazaki resigned due to his candidacy for the 2023 Kōtō Ward Mayoral election. The by-election was won by independent candidate Aya Sannohe.

=== Shinagawa Ward ===
Independent Assembly member Kyoko Morisawa resigned due to her candidacy for the 2022 Shinagawa Ward Mayoral election. The by-election was won by independent candidate Rika Shinohara.

=== Nakano Ward ===
Chiharu Araki, leader of Tomin First no Kai, resigned due to her candidacy for the 2022 House of Councillors election. The by-election was won by Araki, who ran again for her old seat.

=== Kita Ward ===
Independent Assembly member Kanako Yamada resigned due to her candidacy for the 2023 Kita Ward Mayoral election. The by-election was won by Tomin First candidate Miki Komazaki.

=== Itabashi Ward ===
Tomin First Assembly member Kinoshita Fumiko resigned in November 2021 following a scandal after she was repeatedly caught driving without a license. The by-election was won by LDP candidate Yuki Kono.

=== Adachi Ward ===
LDP Assembly member Naoki Takashima died in office in October 2023. The by-election was won by CDP candidate Yuiko Ginka.

=== Hachioji ===
LDP Assembly member Ken Nishiyama died in office in August 2022. The by-election was won by independent candidate Yasuhiko Takita.

=== Fuchu ===
LDP Assembly member Kinji Suzuki died in office in June 2023. The by-election was won by LDP candidate Haruka Masuyama.

=== Minamitama ===
Tomin First Assembly member Ryoichi Ishikawa died in office in June 2024. The by-election was won by Tomin First candidate Chihiro Endo.
