= Shinji Ishimaru =

Japanese politician

- 石丸 伸二
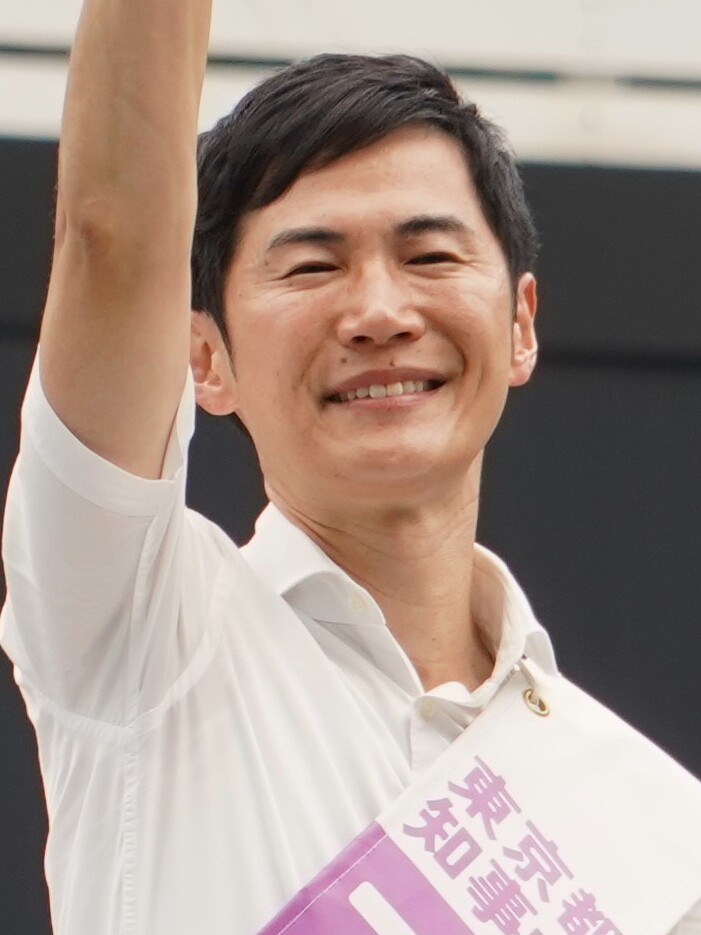
- Ishimaru in 2024

Mayor of Akitakata
- In office 9 August 2020 – 9 June 2024
- Preceded by: Hiroshi Kodama
- Succeeded by: Etsushi Fujimoto

Personal details
- Born: 12 August 1982 (age 44) Akitakata, Hiroshima, Japan
- Party: Saisei no Michi
- Education: Kyoto University (BEc)
- Website: Official website

Shinji Ishimaru (Japanese: 石丸 伸二, Hepburn: Ishimaru Shinji; born 12 August 1982) is a Japanese politician who served as Mayor of Akitakata from 2020 until his resignation in 2024. Ishimaru obtained national prominence as mayor in 2022 after a video of him scolding members of the city council for sleeping during a meeting went viral on social media, with the video gaining 13 million views on YouTube. Ever since then, he has gained a large internet following, especially on Twitter with his vocal political opinions and by documenting his frequent clashes with local political opponents.

Ishimaru ran in the 2024 Tokyo gubernatorial election as an independent, but ultimately lost to incumbent Yuriko Koike. However, Ishimaru secured second place with 1,658,363 votes, capturing 24.3% of the total. His surprising performance exceeded expectations, notably overshadowing Renhō, considered Yuriko Koike's primary challenger.

== Early life ==
Born in Akitakata, Hiroshima, Ishimaru attended the Hiroshima Prefectural Gion Kita High School, then enrolled at Kyoto University's Faculty of Economics. In 2006 following graduation, he became an employee of MUFG Bank and was assigned to their Himeji branch. In 2014 he was assigned to the New York City branch of MUFG Union Bank, a subsidiary of MUFG Bank, as a foreign exchange analyst, and worked in 25 cities across nine states in the United States for four and a half years. He left MUFG Bank in 2020.

== Political career ==
=== Mayor of Akitakata ===
In July 2020, Hiroshi Kodama resigned as Mayor of Akitakata after it was revealed that he received JP¥600,000 in cash from Katsuyuki Kawai, a member of the House of Representatives with allegations of vote buying to aid his wife Anri Kawai's campaign for the House of Councillors. Following this development, Ishimaru decided to run for mayor. He officially declared his candidacy on July 22. In the subsequent mayoral election held on August 9, Ishimaru won against rival Mineaki Takemoto, the then-incumbent vice mayor, with 8,076 votes (60.18% of the popular vote).

On May 10, 2024, in a press conference, Ishimaru announced that he would not seek reelection as mayor of Akitakata, but expressed his intention to continue his career as a politician. He expressed interest in running for Governor of Tokyo and the House of Representatives.

=== 2024 Tokyo gubernatorial election ===
On May 16, 2024, Ishimaru announced his intention to run in the 2024 Tokyo gubernatorial election. He held a press conference in Hiroshima on the next day and officially announced his candidacy for the gubernatorial election, revealing that he would run as an independent and without the endorsement of a political party.

Ishimaru placed second with 1,658,363 votes, securing 24.3% of the total vote share. His unexpected performance surpassed many expectations, particularly overshadowing Renhō, widely considered to be incumbent Yuriko Koike's primary challenger. In his concession speech, he said that he is thinking of entering national politics in the future, hinting a candidacy for the Hiroshima 1st district of the House of Representatives, the constituency of prime minister Fumio Kishida.
