= Yoshiro Nakamatsu =

Japanese inventor (born 1928)

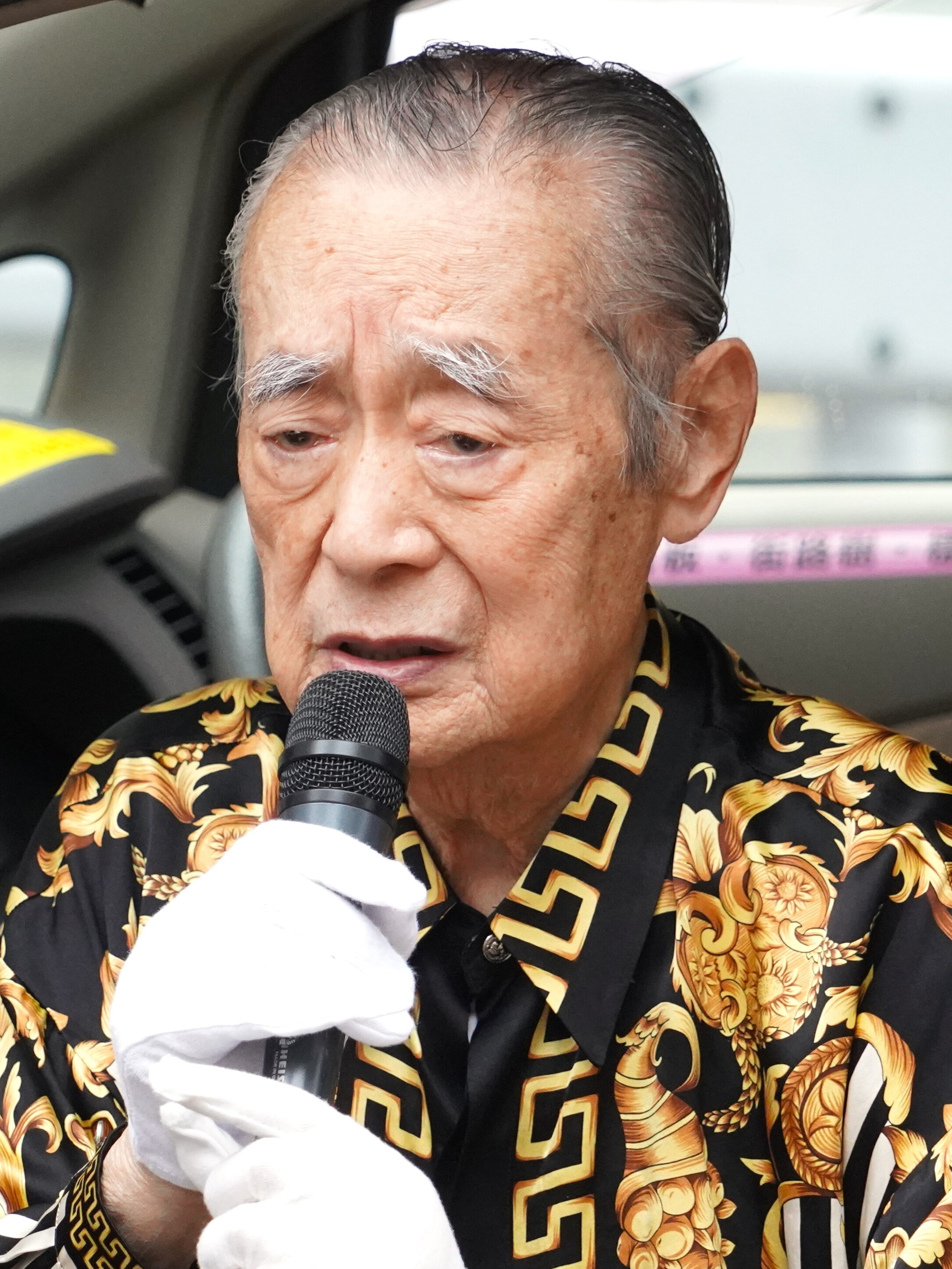
- Nakamatsu in 2024
- Born: June 26, 1928 (age 98)
- Other name: Dr. NakaMats
- Education: University of Tokyo
- Occupation: Inventor
- Known for: Ownership of over 3,500 patents

Japanese name
- Kanji: 中松 義郎
- Kana: なかまつ よしろう
Transcriptions
- Romanization: Nakamatsu Yoshirō
- Website: dr.nakamats.com

Signature
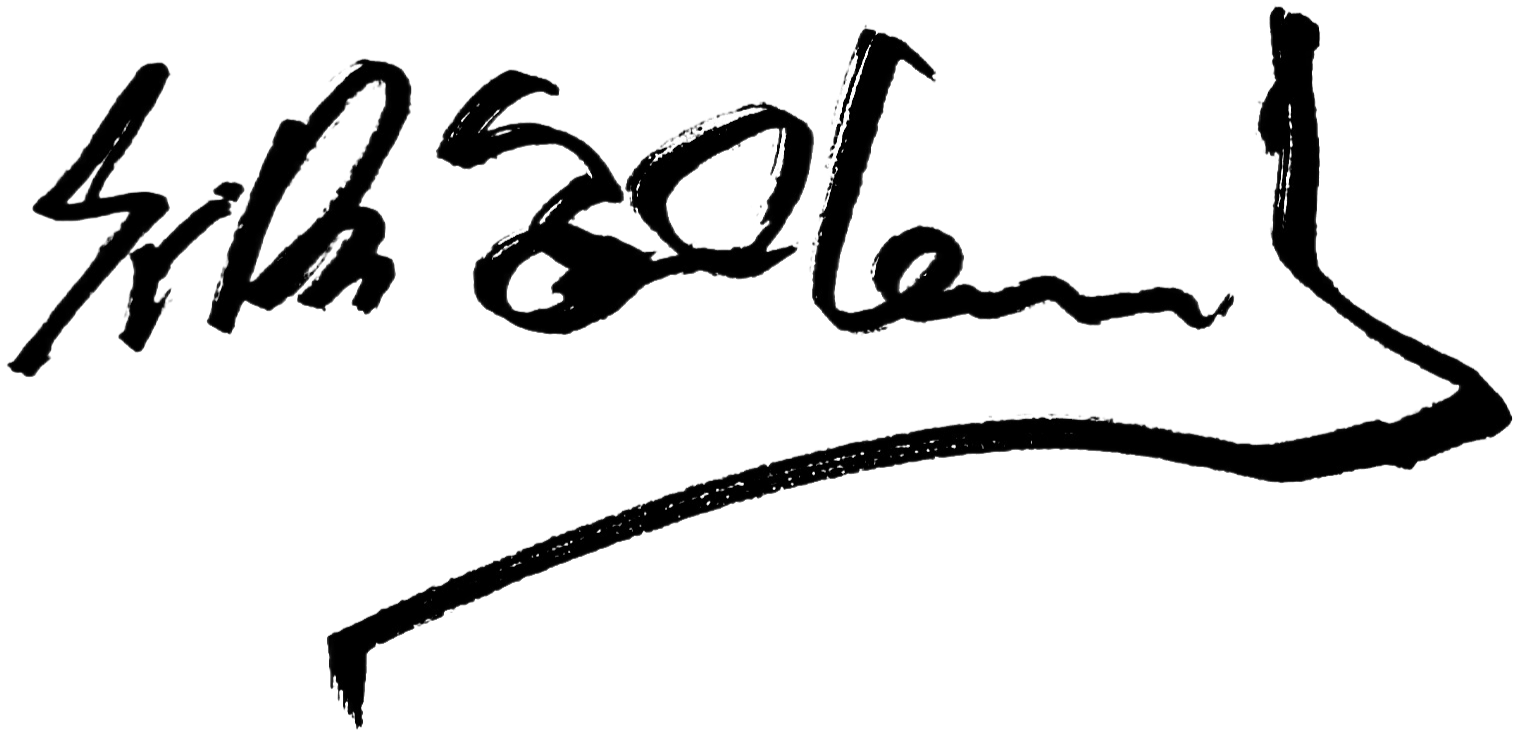

Yoshiro Nakamatsu (中松 義郎, Nakamatsu Yoshirō; born June 26, 1928), also known as Dr. NakaMats (ドクター中松, Dokutā Nakamatsu), is a Japanese inventor. He regularly appears on Japanese talk shows demonstrating his inventions. Nakamatsu is known as a perennial candidate in Japanese politics, having contested elections regularly since the early 1990s.

== Creative process ==
Nakamatsu has described an unconventional creative process, which involves sleeping just four hours from 4 a.m. to 8 a.m., a music listening routine, and eating one meal per day, explaining that "this saves time for more work." He regularly swims laps and dives underwater, where he says he comes up with his best ideas, and records them on a waterproof notepad. Nakamatsu claims to benefit from lack of oxygen to the brain during his dives, making inventions "0.05 seconds before death." He also claims that his "Calm Room," a bathroom constructed without nails and tiled in 24-karat gold, encourages creative thinking by blocking television and radio waves. He also has an elevator in his house that he claims helps him think better, although he strictly denies that it is an elevator and describes it as a "vertical moving room". He predicts that he will live until the age of 144.

== Inventions ==
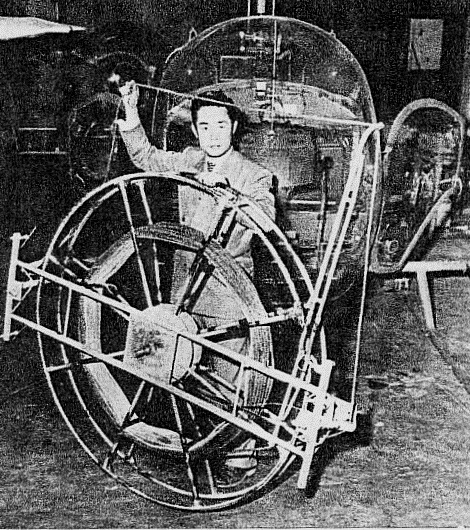
Nakamatsu in the 1950s

Nakamatsu is a prolific inventor, and he even claims to hold the world record for number of more than 3,200 inventions. While his claim to a "world record" has been described as a record for patents by several media articles, several other sources do not list Nakamatsu among the world's most prolific inventors (he has six patent families).

Among Nakamatsu's early inventions is the Shoyu Churu Churu, a siphon pump used in the home to move soy sauce from large containers to smaller vessels for cooking and serving. His patented inventions include:

- Juusyoku Record (Japanese: 重色レコード, romanized: Jūshoku rekōdo, lit. 'stacked color record / dual color record') – An optical sound media which uses a printed paper sheet instead of transparent film (1952)
- "Magnetic record sheet" - "a method for forming signal record track comprising a number of spiral signal track loops ..." (1964)
- "Enerex" - System for generating hydrogen and oxygen
- "PyonPyon" - Jumping shoes with leaf springs on their soles
- "Cerebrex" armchair, a chair that supposedly improves mental function such as calculation and thinking by cooling the head and heating the feet
- A toilet seat lifter
- A condom with an embedded magnet, supposedly "improving sensitivity" as "electricity is generated in the blood vessels in the female organs by Fleming's left-hand rule"
- A protective envelope for floppy disk (1975-1983), and a head-cleaning floppy disk (1981-1988)
- A CD for supposedly "enhancing brightness or sexual function"
- A cigarette-like device for supposedly "activating the brain"
- A pillow preventing falling asleep while driving (an air compressor strapped to the cars headrest, forcibly feeding air to the driver)
- A peephole in a sheet of material, described as a "oneway visible shielding object"
- Spectacles in the shape of eyes, so that the user appears to wear no spectacles
- A "wig for self defense" — a strip and a weight are attached to a wig. The wearer swings the wig to hit an attacker.
- Love Jet - A sexual enhancement product which he created out of concern about Japan's declining birthrate. In a 1995 interview, he explained that the purpose of the aphrodisiac was "to save Japan".

=== Floppy disk ===
Animated diagram of Juusyoku Record, with which Nakamatsu claims invention of the floppy disk

Upon the basis of the Juusyoku Record patent issued in 1952, Nakamatsu claims to have invented the first floppy disk well before IBM's floppy disk patent was filed in 1969. However, what Nakamatsu patented in 1952 was a paper for optical sound player. In contrast to a floppy disk, this Nakamatsu patent discloses the use of printed paper for storage instead of the magnetic material of a floppy disk. It is not rewritable and lacks most elements of the IBM floppy disk patent. Since the paper was 'floppy' material, he claims he had invented the floppy disk (sometimes he uses the phrase "floppy media"); however, flexible magnetic recording media was well known prior to 1952, in tape and wire recording.

According to Nakamatsu, IBM reached licensing agreements with him in the late 1970s. He also says to have licensed his floppy disk to IBM in 1979, but that the details are "confidential". An IBM spokesman, Mac Jeffery, confirmed that the company did license some of his patents, but said that they were not for the floppy disk, which he said IBM invented on its own. Another IBM spokesman, Brian Doyle, said that the company licensed 14 patents from Nakamatsu and those patents do not have anything to do with the floppy disk.

== Personal life ==
Nakamatsu is the son of Hajime Nakamatsu, a banker, and Yoshino Nakamatsu, a teacher who provided early tutoring in mathematics and science and encouraged him to begin inventing. He studied engineering at the University of Tokyo. He has three children.

In June 2014, Nakamatsu, who has contended that it should be possible for people to reach 144 years of age by taking care of their health, revealed that he is suffering from prostate cancer and that his doctors did not expect him to live past the end of 2015. He has sought a new treatment for the disease. In September 2015, Nakamatsu appeared at the awards ceremony for the Ig Nobel prizes, where he performed a song about his medical condition.

== Political aspirations ==
Nakamatsu is a perennial political candidate. In 2004 he told the Japan Times that "politics is a part of inventions," explaining that it is an "invisible invention" along the lines of concepts such as education and happiness. Since 1995 he has unsuccessfully campaigned multiple times to be elected Governor of Tokyo, including, at an age of 96 years, in the 2024 election where he was ranked 11th. He has also campaigned unsuccessfully for election to the House of Councillors, the upper house of the National Diet. In 2010 and 2013 he ran as a candidate of the Happiness Realization Party.

== Media coverage and recognition ==
Nakamatsu has appeared on several American TV shows, including Lifestyles of the Rich and Famous, Late Night with David Letterman, CNN's Make, Create, Innovate, and Bizarre Foods with Andrew Zimmern. He also appeared on the BBC show Adam and Joe Go Tokyo and the BBC radio show Jon Ronson On... In 2005, Nakamatsu was awarded the Ig Nobel Prize (a parody of the Nobel Prize) for Nutrition, for photographing every meal he has consumed during a period of 34 years. In 2009, Danish filmmaker Kaspar Astrup Schröder made a humorous documentary about Nakamatsu titled The Invention of Dr. NakaMats. In 2010, Nakamatsu claimed he had been granted an honorary title by the Sovereign Military Order of Malta, and introduces himself as "Sir Dr. NakaMats", although his claim has been denied by a representative of the order.

In 2013, Nakamatsu was featured on the Sky 1 programme The Moaning of Life, where Karl Pilkington travels the world to see how people face up to life's biggest issues. In 2015, Full Metal Breakfast released a song called "Dr. NakaMats." in 2016, Nakamatsu was awarded the first Museum Lifetime Visionary Award "in recognition of a uniquely decorated life dedicated to the pursuit of that which we do not yet know" during a celebration of his 88th birthday. The ceremony, held in Cortlandt Alley in New York City, was planned in conjunction with the museum's exhibition of various inventions and personal artifacts of Nakamatsu.

In 2019, Nakamatsu was featured in a mini-documentary by popular YouTube channel Great Big Story, in which Nakamatsu discussed some of his successful inventions and demonstrated his creative process. As of December 12, 2020, it had more than 4.2 million views.

== See also ==
- Chindōgu
- List of Ig Nobel Prize winners
- List of prolific inventors
