= Teruki Gotō =

Japanese musician and perennial candidate (1982–2026)

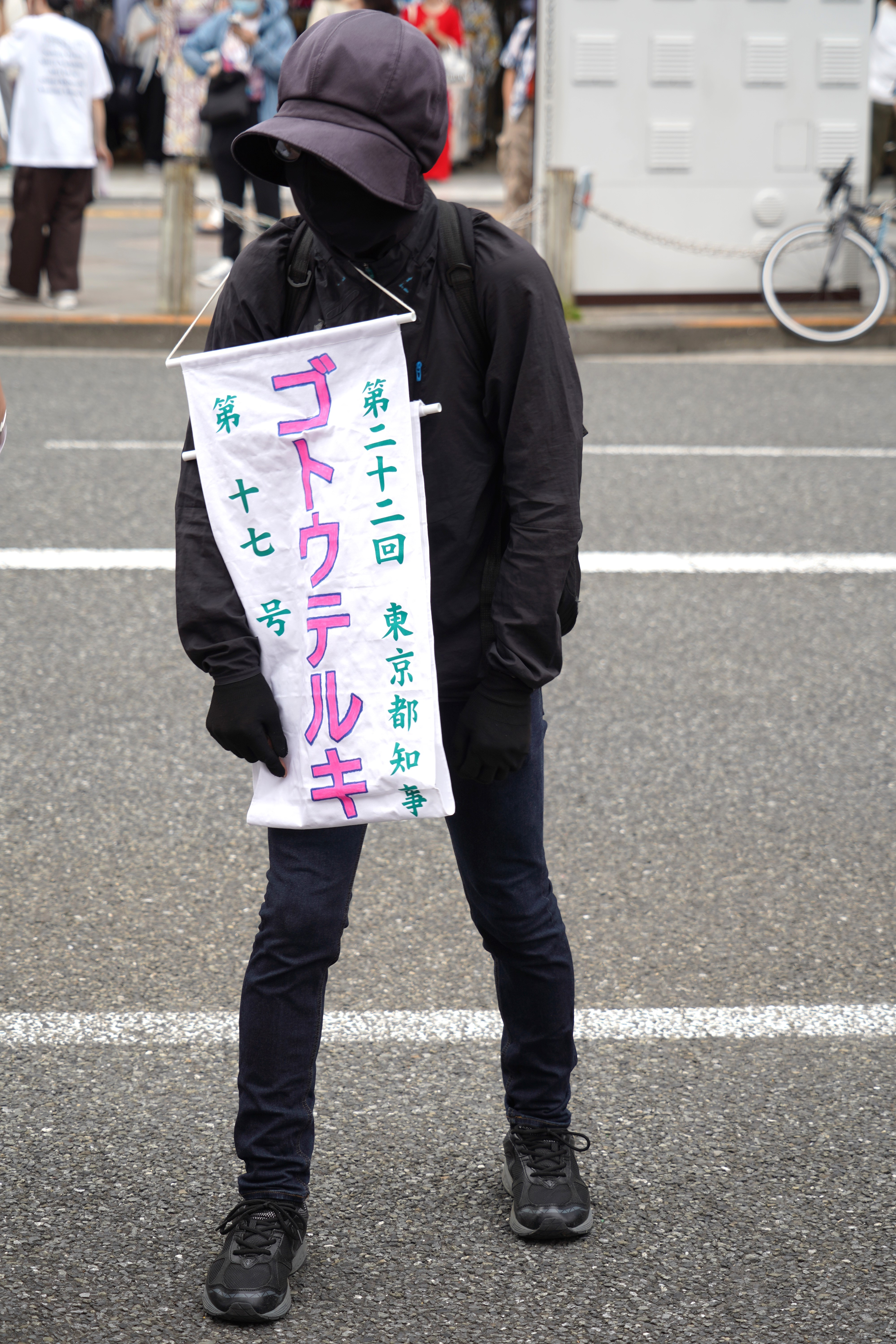
- Gotō campaigning for the 2024 Tokyo Gubernatorial election, June 2024
- Born: December 8, 1982; Kunitachi, Tokyo, Japan
- Died: June 28, 2026 (aged 43)
- Occupations: Musician; Perennial candidate

Teruki Gotō (後藤 輝樹, Gotō Teruki; December 8, 1982 – June 28, 2026) was a Japanese musician and perennial candidate known for his naked election posters. He held a number of nationalist views and ran as a candidate for Mayor of Chiyoda Ward, Tokyo (2013), City Assembly of Chiyoda (2015), Governor of Tokyo (2016), Governor of Tokyo (2020), and Governor of Tokyo (2024).

According to his website, he wished to make Japan the "strongest, kindest, and most interesting country in the world."

In 2016, his television speech became a meme on the Internet when he ran for governor of Tokyo. He continued to speak prohibited words, and as a result 10% of his speech was censored by NHK without his permission.

Gotō died on June 28, 2026, at the age of 43.
