= Tsubasa Party =

Tsubasa Party つばさの党 Tsubasa no tō
- Leader: Atsuhiko Kurokawa
- Secretary-General: Ryosuke Nemoto
- Founded: 20 May 2019
- Headquarters: 2-12 Hayabusachō, Chiyoda, Tokyo 102-0092, Japan
- Ideology: New Right; Conservatism; Anti-vaccine
- Political position: Far-right
- Councillors: 0 / 242
- Representatives: 0 / 465
- Prefectural assembly members: 0 / 2,675
- City and town assembly members: 1 / 30,490

Website
- tsubasa-party.jp

Tsubasa Party (Japanese: つばさの党, romanized: Tsubasa no tō, lit. 'The Party of Wings') is a political party in Japan founded in 2019. The party garnered nationwide controversy during the 2024 by-elections in the Tokyo 15th district for alleged election interference and sabotage, which led to the arrests of party leaders Kurokawa and Nemoto on suspicions of violating Japanese election laws.

== Overview ==
The party was founded on 20 May 2019 by Koichi Kobayashi, Atsuhiko Kurokawa, Naoto Amaki, and Chiba Prefectural Assembly member Kenichi Nishio.

=== Arrests for violating the Public Offices Election Act ===
On May 13, 2024, the Tokyo Metropolitan Police conducted raids at three locations linked to the party and Kurokawa, citing violations of the Public Offices Election Act.

On May 17, Kurokawa, along with two other members of the party, were arrested on suspicion of obstructing public election activities. Tokyo Metropolitan Police's Investigation Division 2 determined that their actions during campaign events, including the use of loudspeakers atop telephone booths and honking car horns, constituted interference under the law.

On June 7, the three were rearrested on charges from the Constitutional Democratic Party of Japan based on increasing evidence of persistent interference, including prolonged vehicle pursuits and disruptive behavior during public speeches. The investigation highlighted multiple instances of these disruptions, prompting the police to conduct on-site inspections and emphasizing the seriousness of these violations under electoral law.

Kurokawa announced his candidacy for the 2024 Tokyo gubernatorial election on June 13 despite the ongoing legal challenges.

== Election results ==
=== By-elections ===
Election	Leader	Constituency	Candidate	Votes	%	Position	Status
2024	Atsuhiko Kurokawa	Tokyo 15th	Ryosuke Nemoto	1,110	0.7	9th	Lost

=== Tokyo Gubernatorial ===
Election	Candidate	Result		
Election	Candidate	Result	Votes	%
2024	Atsuhiko Kurokawa	Lost	1,833	0.02
