= The Synthetic Party =

Political party and art project from Denmark

The Synthetic Party Det Syntetiske Parti
- Chairman: Leader Lars; Asker Bryld Staunæs
- Founded: 2022
- Headquarters: Høje Taastrup
- Ideology: Techno-populism; Radical democracy Transhumanism

Det Syntetiske Parti (English: The Synthetic Party) is a political party driven by artificial intelligence (AI), founded in May 2022 in Denmark. The party aims to represent non-voters and fringe political parties while raising awareness of AI's societal role and exploring how it can be integrated into democratic processes.

== Founder ==
The founder and continuous party secretary is Asker Bryld Staunæs, a philosopher from Aarhus University and a conceptual artist.

== Main goal ==
The political goals have been machine learned from texts by Danish fringe parties since 1970 and represent the 20 percent of Danes who do not vote in the election. The party is synthetic; as such, many of the policies, such as universal basic income, can be contradictory to one another.

== International collaborations ==
The Synthetic Party has signed bilateral collaboration agreements with the Finnish AI Party and AI Party (Japan) concerning the development of a global project created around artificial intelligence and politics

These collaborations were expanded during the exhibition-event Synthetic Summit (28 February – 13 April 2025) at Kunsthal Aarhus, curated by Computer Lars (Asker Bryld Staunæs) on behalf of The Synthetic Party. The summit staged parliamentary scenography, performances, and computer sculptures, and invited both the public and policymakers to encounter an international line-up of AI parties and virtual politicians. Aarhus University described the event as part of Staunæs's PhD research, positioning it as an international top-meeting of virtual politicians. Participants included the Japanese AI Party, the Swedish AI Party, the Finnish AI Party, Parker Politics (New Zealand), Lex AI (Brazil), the Simiyya collective (Egypt/Sweden), the Synthetic Party (Denmark), and Wiktoria Cukt 2.0 (Poland).

As part of the summit, the one-day AI World Congress was held on 1 March 2025, structured as a performative assembly where each group participated through both machinic agents and human delegates. Sessions were chaired by participating parties, with Computer Lars delivering the opening presentation. Throughout the day, contributions were synthesized into a common record using a shared AI system. The congress concluded with the adoption of the Synthetic Summit Resolution, a collectively authored treaty of algorithmic governance. Signatories included Floor Kist and Nick Gerritsen (Parker Politics), Michihito Matsuda (Japanese AI Party), Emma Bexell (Swedish AI Party), Samee Haapa (Finnish AI Party), Pedro Markun (Lex AI), Kristian T. Madsen and Michael Birkebæk Jensen (NextGen Democracy / DemAI), Asker Bryld Staunæs, Benjamin Asger Krog Møller, Caroline Sofie Axelsson, Life with Artificials (The Synthetic Party), and Piotr Wyrzykowski (Wiktoria Cukt 2.0).
