= AI Party (Japan) =

Japanese Political Party

AI Party AI党（人工知能が日本を変える党）
- Founded: 31 March 2019
- Headquarters: Tokyo, Japan
- Membership: ≈30
- Municipal councilors: 1

Website
- https://www.ai-mayor.com/

AI Party (Japanese: AI党) is a local political party in Tokyo, Japan.

== History ==
The party nominated Hiromi Izawa in the Tama city council election held on April 21, 2019, but lost, coming in second to last. In the April 10, 2022 election, the party nominated Jumbo Matsuda, who also lost, finishing in third place.

In November 2023, candidate "AI Mayor" ran for office in Manazuru, Kanagawa. In November, an agreement was also reached to partner with Synthetic Party (Denmark) and jointly build a generative AI political platform and a government by algorithm platform.

In March 2024, Tsukasa Yuji was nominated and elected in the Kosaka, Akita, assembly election.

"AI Mayor" was nominated for 2024 Tokyo gubernatorial election held on July 7 and ranked 17th out of 56 candidates. In September, an EMH-experiment was conducted on the 2024 Liberal Democratic Party presidential election using the election prediction market "Polex".

In March 2025, AI Mayor-4 was fielded in the Musashimurayama mayoral election, and AI Mayor-2 was fielded in the Koganei city council election. Both candidates were defeated.

== Policy ==
The party claims to entrust all policy-making to AI. It claims that it will use AI to read city council minutes, visualize commonly used phrases in council meetings, and use the results to help with policy-making. The party's slogans are: "Fair politics without ties," "Swiftly implement policies for the future," "Accumulate information and accumulate know-how to pass on to the next generation," and "Since democracy is not working, we will use fair AI to conduct politics without ties".

The party pledged to use AI in the budget process to cut unnecessary funds and to reorganize transport routes to optimize them based on the population and travel behavior of citizens. The AI candidate claimed to read all existing administrative documents and reform the political activities and expenditures.

They claim that by having AI analyze information about local governments and needs of residents, and then forcing revisions to budget proposals, it will be possible to prevent favoritism when allocating budgets," and that "human legislators will become unnecessary."

== See also ==
- Cyberocracy
- E-governance
- Government by algorithm#AI politicians
- Team Mirai
