= Naoki Takashima =

Japanese politician (1950–2023)

President of the Tokyo Metropolitan Assembly
- In office 3 October 2014 – 8 October 2015
- Preceded by: Toshiaki Yoshino
- Succeeded by: Shigeo Kawai

Personal details
- Born: 13 May 1950 Adachi, Tokyo, Japan
- Died: 2 October 2023 (aged 73)
- Party: LDP
- Education: Dokkyo University

Naoki Takashima (Japanese: 高島直樹 Takashima Naoki; 13 May 1950 – 2 October 2023) was a Japanese politician. A member of the Liberal Democratic Party, he served as President of the Tokyo Metropolitan Assembly from 2014 to 2015.

Takashima died on 2 October 2023, at the age of 73.
