= Deaths in September 2023 =

The following is a list of notable deaths in September 2023.

Entries for each day are listed alphabetically by surname. A typical entry lists information in the following sequence:

- Name, age, country of citizenship at birth, subsequent country of citizenship (if applicable), reason for notability, cause of death (if known), and reference.

== September 2023 ==
=== 1 ===
- Dennis Austin, 76, American computer programmer, co-creator of Microsoft PowerPoint, lung cancer.
- Ken Bennett, 83, Australian footballer (Collingwood).
- Jimmy Buffett, 76, American singer-songwriter ("Margaritaville", "Cheeseburger in Paradise"), founder of Jimmy Buffett's Margaritaville, Merkel-cell carcinoma.
- Gerald P. Carmen, 93, American diplomat, representative to the European Office of the UN (1984–1986) and administrator of the GSA (1981–1984).
- Alwyn Davies, 97, British chemist.
- Olav Eikeland, 67, Norwegian philosopher and employment researcher.
- Elton Gissendanner, 95, American veterinarian and politician, member of the Florida House of Representatives (1967–1968).
- Hadino Hishongwa, 80, Namibian politician, MP (1989–2005).
- Karim Al Iraqi, 68, Iraqi poet, cancer.
- Lennart Jonsson, 90, Swedish Olympic sprinter (1960).
- Charles Joseph Knight, 91, Canadian doctor, surgeon general (1988–1990).
- J. Landis Martin, 77, American lawyer and businessman.
- Jelaing Mersat, 74, Malaysian politician, MP (2004–2013).
- Raymond Moriyama, 93, Canadian architect (Canadian War Museum, Embassy of Canada, Tokyo).
- Shozaburo Nakamura, 89, Japanese politician, minister of justice (1998–1999) and MP (1979–2005).
- Olivier Picard, 83, French Hellenist.
- Bill Richardson, 75, American politician, member of the U.S. House of Representatives (1983–1997), UN ambassador (1997–1998), governor of New Mexico (2003–2011).
- Yvonne Shima, 88, Canadian actress and singer (The World of Suzie Wong, Dr. No, The Cool Mikado).
- Sitt Nyein Aye, 67, Burmese artist and political activist.
- Nels J. Smith, 84, American politician, member (1963–1979) and speaker of (1977–1979) the Wyoming House of Representatives, traffic collision.
- Milka Stojanović, 86, Serbian operatic soprano (National Theatre in Belgrade).
- Amin Syam, 77, Indonesian politician, governor of South Sulawesi (2003–2008), kidney failure.
- Tempt One, 54, American graffiti artist, complications from amyotrophic lateral sclerosis.
- Ludovic Vaty, 34, French basketball player (JSA Bordeaux Basket, national team), complications from a heart attack.
- Karl Wöllert, 81, Austrian politician, member of the Federal Council (1990–1997).

=== 2 ===
- Walter Arlen, 103, Austrian-born American composer and music critic.
- Naldo Dasso, 92, Argentine Olympic equestrian (1956, 1960).
- Terry Dempsey, 91, American politician.
- Bill R. Fuller, 85, American politician, member of the Kansas House of Representatives (1979–1984).
- Jack Golson, 96, British-born Australian archaeologist.
- Max Gomez, 72, Cuban-born American medical journalist (WNBC, WCBS-TV).
- Salif Keïta, 76, Malian footballer (Saint-Étienne, Valencia, national team).
- Michael Klar, 80, German graphic artist.
- Robert A. Lamb, 72, British-American virologist.
- Arnfinn Larsen, 93, Norwegian Olympic rower (1952).
- Paul Kazuhiro Mori, 84, Japanese Roman Catholic prelate, auxiliary bishop of Tokyo (1985–2000).
- Michele Miraglia, 88, Italian politician, senator (1976–1983).
- Ilija Mitić, 83, Serbian-American footballer (San Jose Earthquakes, Oakland Clippers, United States national team).
- Surjya Narayan Patro, 74, Indian politician, speaker of the Odisha Legislative Assembly (2019–2022).
- Adrien Ouellette, 83, Canadian politician, MNA (1976–1985).
- Mark Pearson, 83, English footballer (Manchester United, Fulham, Sheffield Wednesday).
- Morteza Poursamadi, 70, Iranian cinematographer (Gilaneh, Hush! Girls Don't Scream, Intoxicated by Love).
- Marcia de Rousse, 70, American actress (True Blood, St. Elsewhere, Schooled).
- R. S. Shivaji, 66, Indian actor (Apoorva Sagodharargal, Kolamaavu Kokila, Dharala Prabhu).
- Shannon Wilcox, 80, American actress (The Border, Songwriter, Buck James).

=== 3 ===
- Francois Barrie, 79, Dominican politician.
- Jean Bergougnoux, 83, French businessman, president of the SNCF (1994–1995).
- Ruschell Boone, 48, Jamaican-born American newscaster, pancreatic cancer.
- Yolanda Ciani, 85, Mexican actress.
- Amando de Miguel, 86, Spanish sociologist.
- Gerry Doherty, 70, British trade unionist, general secretary of TSSA (2004–2011).
- José Gregori, 92, Brazilian jurist and politician, minister of justice (2000–2001).
- Peter Gustavsson, 65, Swedish ice hockey player (Colorado Rockies, Fort Worth Texans).
- Miklós Hanó, 66, Hungarian politician, MP (1998–2002, 2010–2014).
- Stephen Herbert, 71–72, British visual media historian, pancreatic cancer.
- Gilberto Hernández, 26, Panamanian footballer (C.A. Independiente de La Chorrera), shot.
- Carme Junyent, 68, Spanish Catalan linguist, pancreatic cancer.
- Brad Maxwell, 66, Canadian ice hockey player (Minnesota North Stars, Toronto Maple Leafs, Vancouver Canucks), lung cancer.
- Jingles Pereira, 77, Portuguese-born South African football player (Cape Town City, Kaizer Chiefs) and manager (Orlando Pirates).
- Piloo Reporter, 84, Indian cricket umpire.
- Paul Roach, 95, American football coach (Wyoming Cowboys, Denver Broncos, Oakland Raiders).
- Morgan Samuelsson, 55, Swedish ice hockey player (Luleå HF, Södertälje SK, AIK IF) and coach.
- José Sébéloué, 74, French singer and musician (La Compagnie Créole).
- Heath Streak, 49, Zimbabwean cricketer (Matabeleland, Warwickshire, national team), liver cancer.
- Yarol Tafur, 22, Ecuadorian footballer (Atlético Chiriquí), shot.
- John F. C. Turner, 96, British architect and theorist.
- David Watkins, 81, Welsh rugby league (Salford Red Devils, national team) and rugby union (national team) player.

=== 4 ===
- Danas Andriulionis, 71, Lithuanian painter.
- Yunus Bandu, 81, Indonesian military officer and politician, regent of Sidenreng Rappang (1988–1993) and Luwu (1994–1999).
- Guðbergur Bergsson, 90, Icelandic writer (The Swan).
- Wilma Briggs, 92, American baseball player (Fort Wayne Daisies, South Bend Blue Sox).
- Teté Caturla, 85, Cuban singer (Cuarteto d'Aida).
- Edward J. Early Jr., 92, American politician, member of the Massachusetts House of Representatives (1973–1977) and mayor of Lowell, Massachusetts (1966–1967).
- Jonty Farmer, 78, New Zealand Olympic sailor (1968, 1976).
- Edith Grossman, 87, American literary translator, pancreatic cancer.
- Murray G. Hall, 76, Canadian Germanist and specialist in literature.
- Helmut Halupka, 74, German engineer and politician, member of the Landtag of Saxony-Anhalt (1998–2002).
- Steve Harwell, 56, American singer (Smash Mouth), liver failure.
- Hameur Hizem, 85, Tunisian football manager (US Monastir, Stade Tunisien, national team).
- Sherali Joʻrayev, 76, Uzbek singer, actor, and politician, MP (1990–1995).
- Tail Dragger Jones, 82, American Chicago blues singer.
- Tirso del Junco, 98, Cuban-American politician and Olympic rower (1948).
- Muthoni Kirima, 92, Kenyan guerrilla fighter (Mau Mau uprising).
- Eero Laine, 89, Finnish Olympic rower (1960).
- Peter Lashley, 86, Barbadian cricketer (West Indies, national team).
- Alex McIntosh, 89, Canadian politician, member of the Nova Scotia House of Assembly (1984–1988).
- Patricia McNulty, 80, American actress (Tammy Tell Me True, My Three Sons, The Many Loves of Dobie Gillis).
- Eddie Meador, 86, American football player (Los Angeles Rams).
- Ireneusz Michaś, 85, Polish veterinarian and politician, senator (1993–2001).
- Filip Minařík, 48, Czech jockey, suicide.
- Violeta Mițul, 26, Moldovan footballer (Einherji, national team), fall.
- Mick Molloy, 85, Irish Olympic long-distance runner (1968).
- Denis Monette, 86, Canadian writer and journalist.
- Ferid Murad, 86, American physician and pharmacologist, Nobel Prize laureate (1998).
- Gérard Orth, 87, French virologist.
- Napoleon Pop, 78, Romanian economist and politician, deputy (2000–2004).
- Brayley Reynolds, 88, Welsh footballer (Swansea Town, Cardiff City).
- Jurate Rosales, 93, Lithuanian-born Venezuelan journalist and amateur historian.
- Doug Shanks, 76, American college baseball coach (Mississippi Valley State).
- E. Mary Smallwood, 103, British historian and academic.
- Kuniji Toda, 88, Japanese engineer and politician, member of the House of Councillors (1995–2001).
- Anton Tus, 91, Croatian military officer, chief of the general staff (1991–1992).
- John Wolfe Jr., 69, American attorney and politician.
- Gary Wright, 80, American singer-songwriter ("Dream Weaver", "Love Is Alive") and musician (Spooky Tooth), Parkinson's disease and Lewy body dementia.
- Jim Yeats, 87, American football player (Houston Oilers).

=== 5 ===
- Ronald K. Anderson, 89, American trumpeter.
- Albert Azaryan, 94, Armenian gymnast, Olympic champion (1956, 1960).
- Otta Bednářová, 96, Czech journalist and dissident (Charter 77), co-founder of VONS.
- David Black, 95, American sculptor.
- María Teresa Campos, 82, Spanish journalist and television presenter (Cada día), respiratory failure.
- Pierre Camu, 100, Canadian geographer and civil servant.
- Necmettin Cevheri, 93, Turkish politician, minister of tourism (1969–1971) and MP (1965–1973, 1990–2002).
- Larry Chance, 82, American doo-wop singer (The Earls).
- Jürgen Claus, 88, German artist and author.
- Christopher Coker, 70, British political scientist and philosopher.
- Kenneth M. Dye, 87, Canadian accountant and civil servant, auditor general (1981–1991).
- Adam Exner, 94, Canadian Roman Catholic prelate, bishop of Kamloops (1974–1982), archbishop of Winnipeg (1982–1991) and Vancouver (1991–2004).
- Joe Fagin, 83, British singer ("Breakin' Away / That's Livin' Alright").
- Enrique Forero, 80, Colombian botanist.
- Antonio Galves, 76, Brazilian mathematician (Galves–Löcherbach model), member of the Brazilian Academy of Sciences.
- Charles Gayle, 84, American jazz saxophonist and pianist.
- Robin Gladwin, 83, English footballer (Norwich City, Oxford United).
- Bruce Guthro, 62, Canadian singer-songwriter ("Walk This Road", "Falling") and musician (Runrig), cancer.
- Lee Halliday, 95, American singer and record producer.
- Erkki Hautamäki, 93, Finnish Olympic decathlete (1952) and historian.
- Molly Holzschlag, 60, American author (The Zen of CSS Design) and lecturer.
- Yuri Kondratiev, 69, Ukrainian academic and mathematician.
- Richard Laviolette, 41, Canadian singer-songwriter, assisted suicide.
- George Lefont, 85, American movie theater owner (Plaza Theatre).
- Bernard de Marcken de Mercken, 88, Belgian baron and politician, member of the Parliament of the Brussels-Capital Region (1989–1995).
- Hassan Rahnavardi, 96, Iranian physician, politician and weightlifter, twice MP.
- Shabtai Shavit, 84, Israeli intelligence officer, director of Mossad (1989–1996).
- John Stevenson, 86, British television writer (Coronation Street, Brass, Nearest and Dearest), complications from Alzheimer's disease.
- Ivan Šuker, 65, Croatian politician and economist, minister of finance (2003–2010).
- Anatol Ugorski, 80, Russian-born German pianist, cancer.
- Corinna Werwigk-Hertneck, 70, German lawyer and politician.

=== 6 ===
- Raymond Ackerman, 92, South African business retailer, chairman of Checkers (1956–1966) and Pick n Pay Stores (1966–2020).
- José María Agüero, 76, Costa Rican footballer (Liga Deportiva Alajuelense, national team).
- Didi Biçaku, 99, Albanian historian and partisan.
- Marc Bohan, 97, French fashion designer (Dior).
- Marcel Boiteux, 101, French economist, mathematician, and civil servant.
- Robyn Broughton, 80, New Zealand netball coach (Southern Sting, Central Pulse, FastNet Ferns).
- John Cairney, 93, Scottish actor (A Night to Remember, Cleopatra, Jason and the Argonauts), author and painter.
- Julie Cassidy, 58, Australian legal scholar. (death announced on this date)
- Ebadur Rahman Chowdhury, 76, Bangladeshi politician, MP (1988–1996, 2001–2006).
- Richard Davis, 93, American jazz bassist.
- Richard M. Dellinger, 87, American politician, member of the Indiana House of Representatives (1972–1992).
- John Winston Foran, 71, Canadian politician and police officer, New Brunswick MLA (2003–2010), pancreatic cancer.
- Alberto Ginulfi, 81, Italian footballer (Roma, Hellas Verona, Cremonese).
- Ian Hamilton, 55, English footballer (Scunthorpe United, West Bromwich Albion).
- Denis Herard, 79, Canadian politician, Alberta MLA (1993–2008).
- Lucrecia Hernández Mack, 49, Guatemalan politician, MP (since 2020), cancer.
- Jeong Si-chae, 87, South Korean politician, MNA (1981–1988, 1992–1996), minister of agriculture, forestry and fisheries (1996–1997).
- Adnan Al-Kaissie, 84, Iraqi professional wrestler (AWA, WWWF, WWF).
- Dermot Keogh, 78, Irish historian.
- Kim No-sik, 78, South Korean politician, MNA (1981–1985, 2008–2012).
- Hans-Ulrich Klose, 86, German politician, MP (1983–2013) and mayor of Hamburg (1974–1981), complications from Alzheimer's disease.
- Lothar Koch, 83, German politician, member of the Landtag of Lower Saxony (1994–2017).
- Ihor Kozlovskyi, 69, Ukrainian historian and theologian, heart attack.
- Gullan Lindblad, 90, Swedish nurse and politician, MP (1979–1998).
- Gareth Miles, 85, Welsh author and translator.
- Kjell-Rune Milton, 75, Swedish ice hockey player (1972 Olympics, Frölunda, Kölner Haie).
- David O. Moberg, 101, American sociologist of religion.
- Giuliano Montaldo, 93, Italian film director (Machine Gun McCain, Sacco & Vanzetti, Giordano Bruno), screenwriter and actor.
- Silas Muriuki, 74, Kenyan politician, MP (2007–2013).
- Malini Rajurkar, 82, Indian classical singer.
- Steve Roden, 59, American contemporary artist and musician (Forms of Paper).
- Irene Schuch, 87, German Olympic discus thrower (1960).
- Aditya Dicky Singh, 57, Indian wildlife conservationist and photographer, heart attack.
- Louis Vitale, 91, American Franciscan friar and peace activist, co-founder of Nevada Desert Experience.
- Whitey Von Nieda, 101, American basketball player (Baltimore Bullets).

=== 7 ===
- Oraldo Britos, 90, Argentine politician, MP (1973–1976, 1983–2003) and minister of labour (2001).
- Oded Eran, 82, Israeli diplomat, ambassador to Jordan (1997–2000) and the European Union (2002–2007), head negotiator for the Israeli–Palestinian peace process (1999–2000).
- Marie-Thérèse Gantenbein-Koullen, 85, Luxembourgish politician, deputy (2004–2009).
- Wayne Greenstreet, 74, New Zealand cricketer (Wellington, Central Districts).
- Jean-Christian Grinevald, 78, French stage director.
- Geechy Guy, 59, American stand-up comedian.
- Frédérique Hébrard, 96, French screenwriter and actress.
- Edward Hide, 86, British jockey.
- Wanda Janicka, 100, Polish architect, participant in the Warsaw Uprising.
- María Jiménez, 73, Spanish singer.
- Enver Mamedov, 100, Russian diplomat and mass media manager, first deputy chairman of the State Committee of Television and Radio Broadcasting of the Soviet Union (1962–1985).
- Johnny Mathis, 80, American basketball player (New Jersey Americans, Allentown Jets).
- Ginger Mayson, 68, American college volleyball coach (Michigan State Spartans).
- Edgar Moron, 82, German politician, member of the Landtag of North Rhine-Westphalia (1990–2010).
- Peter C. Newman, 94, Canadian journalist (The Canadian Establishment), complications from Parkinson's disease.
- Akira Nishimura, 69, Japanese composer, jaw cancer.
- Eberhard Otto, 75, German entrepreneur and politician, MP (2002–2005).
- Guido Rhodio, 87, Italian politician, president of Calabria (1992–1994).
- Margherita Rinaldi, 88, Italian lyric soprano.
- Raimundo Varela, 75, Brazilian broadcaster, politician, and television presenter.

=== 8 ===
- Daniel Alicea, 50, Puerto Rican boxer, leukemia.
- Monique Bégin, 87, Canadian politician, MP (1972–1984), minister of national revenue (1976–1977) and twice of health.
- Didier Berthet, 61, French Roman Catholic prelate, bishop of Saint-Dié (since 2016).
- James M. Brown, 81, American trial attorney.
- Dave Browning, 90, Australian footballer (Carlton).
- William Derek Clayton, 97, British botanist.
- Ronald Creagh, 94, French sociologist.
- Karowei Dorgu, 65, Nigerian-born English bishop, pneumonia.
- Stan Dromisky, 92, Canadian politician, MP (1993–2004).
- Leopold Grausam, 80, Austrian football player (Rapid Vienna, national team) and manager (Floridsdorfer AC).
- Sašo Hribar, 63, Slovenian radio and television personality, heart attack.
- Richard Hu, 96, Singaporean politician, MP (1984–2001), minister of health (1985–1987) and finance (1985–2001).
- Jacques Julliard, 90, French historian, columnist and essayist.
- John Kelly, 75, Irish hurler (Tipperary).
- Shoukat Ali Laleka, 62, Pakistani politician, member of the Provincial Assembly of the Punjab (2013–2018, 2018–2023).
- Mylon LeFevre, 78, American Christian rock singer, cancer.
- Lisa Lyon, 70, American bodybuilder and photography model (Robert Mapplethorpe), stomach cancer.
- G. Marimuthu, 56, Indian film director (Kannum Kannum, Pulivaal) and actor (Ethirneechal), heart attack.
- Tunku Ampuan Najihah, 100, Malaysian royal, Raja Permaisuri Agong (1994–1999).
- Ajit Ninan, 68, Indian political cartoonist.
- Miodrag Novaković, 82–83, Serbian cineast, writer, and film director.
- Dolores Nunes, 82, Brazilian lawyer and politician, deputy (1995–1999), COVID-19.
- Brett Sawyer, 63, American professional wrestler (NWA, SCW).
- Nancy Storrs, 73, American Olympic rower (1976).
- Anthony Sully, 79, American serial killer.
- Leaena Tambyah, 86, Singaporean special education advocate, stroke.
- Felicia Taylor, 59, American news correspondent (CNN International) and anchor (WNBC).
- Buichi Terasawa, 68, Japanese manga artist (Goku Midnight Eye, Cobra), heart attack.
- Keith Usherwood Ingold, 94, British-Canadian chemist.
- Norma O. Walker, 95, American politician, mayor of Aurora, Colorado (1965–1967).
- Adi Winarso, 72, Indonesian politician, mayor of Tegal (1999–2009).
- Mike Yarwood, 82, English comedian, impressionist and actor (Three of a Kind).

=== 9 ===
- Erik Aschengreen, 88, Danish historian and dance critic.
- William B. Black, 81, American politician, member of the Illinois House of Representatives (1986–2010).
- Olav Boksasp, 65, Norwegian football administrator (Molde, Norsk Toppfotball).
- Mangosuthu Buthelezi, 95, South African politician and Zulu prince, minister of home affairs (1994–2004), MP (since 1994) and chief minister of KwaZulu (1977–1994).
- Amara Camara, Guinean diplomat and aid worker.
- Rubén Carolini, 79, Argentine paleontologist, discoverer of the Giganotosaurus.
- Louis Ciccarello, 84, American politician.
- Pierre Claisse, 99, French veterinarian and politician, deputy (1986–1988).
- Domenico De Masi, 85, Italian sociologist and academic.
- John Harris, 84, English footballer (Walsall, Wolverhampton Wanderers). (death announced on this date)
- Christian Lara, 84, Guadeloupean film director (The Legend).
- Peter McKenzie, 80, New Zealand actor (The Lord of the Rings: The Fellowship of the Ring, The Legend of William Tell, King Kong).
- Jerzy Orzeł, 70, Polish entrepreneur and politician, MP (1989–1991).
- Max Simeoni, 94, French Corsican politician, MEP (1989–1994).
- Rainer Troppa, 65, German footballer (Energie Cottbus, BFC Dynamo, East Germany national team).
- Yuan Renguo, 66, Chinese liquor industry executive, politician, and convicted embezzler, chairman of Maotai (2000–2018) and deputy (2003–2008, 2013–2018), cerebral hemorrhage.

=== 10 ===
- Nana Akosua Akyamaa III, 97, Ghanaian traditional royal, queen mother of the Ashanti people in Juaben (since 1994).
- Chowdhury Khurshid Alam, 83, Bangladeshi politician, MP (1986–1990).
- Colin Ayre, 67, English footballer (Newcastle United, Telstar, Wacker Innsbruck).
- Robert S. Bennett, 84, American attorney (Clinton–Lewinsky scandal), kidney failure.
- Evgeny Brazhnik, 78, Russian conductor.
- Hernán Carrasco, 100, Chilean football manager (Águila, Colo-Colo, El Salvador national team).
- Brendan Croker, 70, English musician (The Notting Hillbillies), leukaemia.
- Lloyd Hines, 72, Canadian politician, Nova Scotia MLA (2013–2021).
- Hamidou Laanigri, 84, Moroccan intelligence officer, director of the DGSN (2003–2006).
- Nico Ladenis, 89, British chef and restaurateur.
- Maureen Mann, 79, politician, member of the New Hampshire House of Representatives.
- Don Nicholls, 86, Australian footballer (Carlton).
- Hans Plenk, 85, German luger, Olympic bronze medallist (1964).
- Charlie Robison, 59, American singer-songwriter, cardiac arrest.
- Pierre Trần Thanh Chung, 95, Vietnamese Roman Catholic prelate, bishop of Kon Tum (1995–2003).
- Mabel Walker, 94, American Olympic sprinter (1948).
- Sir Ian Wilmut, 79, British embryologist (Dolly), complications from Parkinson's disease.

=== 11 ===
- Gérald Bataille, 69, Haitian evangelical pastor and community leader.
- Dick Bertel, 92, American radio and television personality (NBC, Mutual Broadcasting System, Voice of America).
- Benito Castro, 77, Mexican musician, comedian (Los Hermanos Castro) and actor (Como dice el dicho), fall.
- Éva Fahidi, 97, Hungarian Holocaust survivor and author.
- Dedi Graucher, 62, Israeli singer, cancer.
- Martin Hámor, 80, Slovak Olympic archer (1992).
- Juan C. Harriott Jr., 86, Argentine polo player.
- Gordon Kennett, 70, English motorcycle speedway racer.
- Lee Sang-hoon, 90, South Korean military officer and politician, minister of national defense (1988–1990).
- Hal Nerdal, 95, Australian Olympic skier (1960).
- Point Given, 25, American Hall of Fame Thoroughbred racehorse, winner of the Preakness Stakes (2001) and Belmont Stakes (2001).
- Manfred Poschenreider, 85, German motorcycle racer.
- Yvonne Přenosilová, 76, Czech singer.
- Ronald L. Rencher, 82, American politician, member (1971–1976) and speaker (1975–1976) of the Utah House of Representatives, U.S. attorney for the District of Utah (1977–1981).
- Howard Safir, 81, American law enforcement official, New York City police (1996–2000) and fire (1994–1996) commissioner, sepsis.
- Bruce Stavert, 83, Canadian Anglican bishop, metropolitan of Canada (2004–2009) and bishop of Quebec (1990–2009).
- Jan Tabachnyk, 78, Ukrainian variety composer, accordionist and politician, MP (2006–2014).
- Mary Terrall, 71, American academic and science historian.
- Endel Tulving, 96, Estonian-born Canadian psychologist and neuroscientist.
- Uwe Wesel, 90, German academic, lawyer and legal historian.
- Adolf Weinacker, 94, American Olympic racewalker (1948, 1952, 1956).
- Akintola Williams, 104, Nigerian chartered accountant, co-founder of the Nigerian Stock Exchange.

=== 12 ===
- Rana Maqbool Ahmad, 74, Pakistani politician, senator (since 2018).
- Roser Amadó, 79, Spanish architect (La Vila Olímpica del Poblenou).
- Beytocan, 67, Turkish-born Swedish Kurdish singer and musician, cancer.
- Olof Björner, 80, Swedish researcher (Bob Dylan).
- Jean Boht, 91, English actress (Bread, Funny Man, Distant Voices, Still Lives), complications from dementia.
- Benedetto Capizzi, 79, Italian mobster (Cosa Nostra).
- Román Chalbaud, 91, Venezuelan film director (Adolescence of Cain, El Pez que Fuma, Carmen, la que contaba 16 años).
- Dominique Colonna, 95, French football player (Reims, national team) and manager (Cameroon national team).
- Damian Evans, Australian-Canadian archeologist, discovered medieval cities surrounding Angkor Wat.
- Julian Gloag, 93, English novelist.
- Brandon Hunter, 42, American basketball player (Boston Celtics, Orlando Magic).
- Elizabeth Jeffreys, 82, British Byzantine scholar, complications from a stroke.
- Kariman, 86, Egyptian actress (My Wife, the Director General).
- Roy Kidd, 91, American Hall of Fame college football coach (Eastern Kentucky Colonels).
- Pete Kozachik, 72, American visual effects artist and animation cinematographer (The Nightmare Before Christmas, Coraline, James and the Giant Peach), complications from primary progressive aphasia.
- László Kutas, 87, Hungarian sculptor.
- Kwak Soon-ok, 91, South Korean singer.
- Petur-Emil Mitev, 87, Bulgarian sociologist and politician, deputy (1990–1991).
- MohBad, 27, Nigerian rapper, singer and songwriter.
- Subas Chandra Nemwang, 70, Nepalese politician, chairman of the Constituent Assembly (2008–2015), heart attack.
- Kurt Raaflaub, 82, Swiss academic and historian.
- Schelto van Heemstra, 82, Dutch diplomat.
- Dione Venables, 92, English novelist and publisher, founder of The Orwell Society.
- Mike Williams, 36, American football player (Tampa Bay Buccaneers, Buffalo Bills), sepsis.
- Zeus, 3, American Great Dane dog, world's tallest dog, pneumonia following cancer surgery.

=== 13 ===
- Manik Bhide, 88, Indian Hindustani classical singer.
- Renato Calligaro, 95, Italian painter and cartoonist.
- Tu'uakitau Cokanauto, 78, Fijian politician, MP (1999–2001).
- Ichikawa En'ō II, 83, Japanese kabuki actor, arrhythmia.
- Sir William Gage, 85, British judge, lord justice of appeal (2004–2008), complications from vascular dementia.
- Jose Harris, 82, British historian.
- Narie Hem, 86, Cambodian actress.
- James E. Kieffer, 80, American politician, member of the North Dakota House of Representatives (1971–1972).
- Joseph J. Kohn, 91, Czech-born American academic and mathematician.
- Lee Sang-hee, 85, South Korean politician, MNA (1981–1988, 1996–2004), minister of science and technology (1988–1990).
- Perrie Mans, 82, South African snooker player.
- John McDonald, 79, Australian rugby league player (Manly Warringah, national team) and coach (Queensland).
- Marvin E. Newman, 95, American photographer.
- Buzzy Peltola, 58, American politician, plane crash.
- Liudvikas Narcizas Rasimavičius, 84, Lithuanian politician, MP (1990–1992).
- Olga Scheltema-de Nie, 84, Dutch politician, MP (1989–2002).
- Bill Smith, 84, American basketball player (New York Knicks).
- Mircea Snegur, 83, Moldovan politician, president (1990–1997) and MP (1990, 1998–2001), cancer.
- Sohanur Rahman Sohan, 62, Bangladeshi film director (Keyamat Theke Keyamat, Ananta Bhalobasha, Se Amar Mon Kereche), stroke.
- Pepe Soriano, 93, Argentine actor (Rebellion in Patagonia, Grandma, Asesinato en el Senado de la Nación).
- Teng Rujun, 76, Chinese actor (Red Sorghum, Postmen in the Mountains), Golden Rooster winner (1999).
- Roger Whittaker, 87, British singer-songwriter ("Durham Town (The Leavin')", "I Don't Believe in If Anymore", "The Last Farewell").
- Jan Wieczorek, 88, Polish Roman Catholic prelate, auxiliary bishop of Opole (1981–1992) and bishop of Gliwice (1992–2011).
- Archduchess Yolande of Austria, 100, Austrian aristocrat.

=== 14 ===
- Marcel Honorat Léon Agboton, 82, Beninese Roman Catholic prelate, bishop of Kandi (1994–2000) and Porto Novo (2000–2005), and archbishop of Cotonou (2005–2010).
- Sir Rudolph Agnew, 89, British business executive (Consolidated Gold Fields).
- Liliana Albertini, 77, Italian politician, deputy (1983–1988).
- Robert Addison Day, 79, American businessman, founder of the TCW Group.
- Pearl Bowser, 92, American film historian and director (Midnight Ramble).
- Robert Tree Cody, 72, American musician.
- Lauch Faircloth, 95, American politician, member of the U.S. Senate (1993–1999) and North Carolina secretary of commerce (1977–1985).
- Bjarni Felixson, 86, Icelandic footballer (KR, national team).
- Laurence Gavron, 67–68, French-Senegalese film director, writer, and photographer.
- Luca Giustolisi, 53, Italian water polo player, Olympic bronze medallist (1996), cancer.
- Carol Harter, 82, American academic administrator, president of the University of Nevada, Las Vegas (1995–2006).
- Herman Høst, 97, Norwegian physician.
- Kim Il-chol, 90, North Korean military officer, minister of defence (1997–2009) and member of the National Defence Commission (1988–2010). (death announced on this date)
- Rob Langer, 74, Australian cricketer (Western Australia).
- Joseph Massino, 80, American mobster.
- Michael McGrath, 65, American actor (Nice Work If You Can Get It, Spamalot, The Secret of Kells), Tony winner (2012).
- Pat Nebo, Nigerian production designer (October 1) and art director.
- Francine Oputa, 70, American scholar.
- Roy Roper, 100, New Zealand rugby union player (Taranaki, national team).
- Marc Simmons, 86, American historian.
- Scott Taylor, 78, American Olympic pentathlete (1972).
- Brian Thrush, 95, British physical chemist and academic.
- Basil van Rooyen, 84, South African racing driver, mesothelioma.
- Antoni Vila Casas, 92, Spanish pharmaceutical executive and philanthropist, founder of Fundació Vila Casas.

=== 15 ===
- Gökhan Abur, 80, Turkish musician, meteorologist and weather presenter.
- Ivan Bondarchuk, 79, Ukrainian politician, deputy (2006–2007).
- Fernando Botero, 91, Colombian painter and sculptor (Woman with Mirror, The Hand, Adam), complications from pneumonia.
- Claude Cormier, 63, Canadian landscape architect, complications from Li–Fraumeni syndrome.
- Hana Doušová, 74, Czech Olympic basketball player (1976).
- Paulo Goulart, 68, Brazilian footballer (Fluminense).
- Maria Huybrechts, 93, Belgian Olympic swimmer (1948).
- Michel Jager, 79, Dutch politician, Queen's commissioner of Flevoland (1996–2008).
- Ady Jung, 84, Luxembourgish businessman and politician, deputy (1989–2003), president of the Benelux Interparliamentary Consultative Council (1995–1996).
- Rolf Koltzsch, 95, German politician, MP (1987–1994).
- Robert A. Kraft, 89, American religious historian.
- Tony Kreft, 78, New Zealand rugby union player (Otago, national team).
- Franco Migliacci, 92, Italian lyricist ("Nel blu, dipinto di blu", "La bambola") and actor (Ladro lui, ladra lei).
- Christopher Miles, 84, British film director (The Six-Sided Triangle, Up Jumped a Swagman, The Clandestine Marriage), producer and writer, cancer.
- Billy Miller, 43, American actor (The Young and the Restless, General Hospital, All My Children), suicide by gunshot.
- Burhan Sargun, 94, Turkish footballer (Fenerbahçe, national team).
- Suzanne Sarroca, 96, French operatic soprano.
- Alexander Shishlyannikov, 72, Tajik military officer, minister of defence (1993–1995).
- Vanessa Show, 72, Argentine travesti performer, heart attack.
- Theo Toemion, 66, Indonesian economist and politician, member of the House of Representatives (1999–2004).
- Yoshiko Tsuchida, 75, Japanese manga artist.
- Michael Yessis, 91, American sports performance trainer.

=== 16 ===
- Jean Allouch, 84, French psychologist and psychoanalyst.
- Ron Barassi, 87, Australian Hall of Fame football player (Melbourne) and coach (Carlton, North Melbourne), complications from a fall.
- Barry Bennell, 69, English football coach and convicted sex offender, cancer.
- Echo Brown, 39, American author.
- Julian J. Bussgang, 98, Polish-born American mathematician and author.
- Nikolai Dobronravov, 94, Russian poet, lyricist ("And the Battle Is Going Again", "Nezhnost'"), and actor (The Return of Vasili Bortnikov).
- David Fennario, 76, Canadian playwright (Balconville).
- Victor Fuchs, 99, American health economist.
- Tulio Hernández Gómez, 85, Mexican politician, two-term deputy, delegate of Azcapotzalco (1976–1979) and governor of Tlaxcala (1981–1987).
- Dagmar R. Henney, 92, German-born American mathematician.
- Arild Hetleøen, 80, Norwegian footballer (Brann, national team).
- Tom Holmes, 88, American politician, member of the Texas House of Representatives (1965–1973).
- Milo Hrnić, 73, Croatian pop singer, infection.
- Thomas M. Humphrey, 88, American economist.
- Helvi Jürisson, 94, Estonian poet, translator and children's book author.
- Murat Karayılan, 69, Turkish Kurdish militant, commander of the People's Defence Forces (since 2014), shot.
- Agnes Kwaje Lasuba, 75, South Sudanese politician.
- Torsti Lehtinen, 81, Finnish writer and philosopher.
- John Marshall, 82, English drummer (Nucleus, Soft Machine, Centipede).
- Gita Mehta, 80, Indian-American writer (Karma Cola, A River Sutra) and filmmaker.
- Lionel Morgan, 85, Australian rugby league player (Wynnum Manly, Queensland, national team).
- Colin Murphy, 79, English football player (Folkestone) and manager (Lincoln City, Vietnam national team).
- Abdul Ati al-Obeidi, 83, Libyan politician and diplomat, prime minister (1977–1979), head of state (1979–1981) and twice minister of foreign affairs, heart attack.
- C. R. Omanakuttan, 80, Indian writer and humorist, haemorrhage.
- Sir Horace Ové, 86, Trinidadian-born British film director (Pressure) and writer.
- Mubarak Qazi, 67, Pakistani poet.
- Handry Satriago, 54, Indonesian conglomerate executive (General Electric).
- Qasem Taei, 63, Iraqi grand ayatollah, heart disease.
- Frank Tuerkheimer, 84, American lawyer, academic and prosecutor, U.S. attorney for the Western District of Wisconsin (1977–1981).
- Wimie Wilhelm, 62, Dutch actress (Baantjer), cancer.

=== 17 ===
- Catherine May Atlani, 77, French dancer, choreographer, and musician.
- Emily Banks, 90, American actress (Gunfight in Abilene, Live a Little, Love a Little, The Tim Conway Show).
- Sheldon Baugh, 80, American politician.
- Pepe Domingo Castaño, 80, Spanish radio and television presenter (Carrusel Deportivo, 300 millones), singer and writer.
- Joy Chambers, 76, Australian actress (The Restless Years, The Young Doctors, Neighbours).
- Petr Charvát, 74, Czech historian, archaeologist and academic.
- Ethel Cook, 72, American Odawa politician.
- Emile Duprée, 86, Canadian professional wrestler (Stampede Wrestling) and promoter (Grand Prix Wrestling).
- Louis Gooren, 79, Dutch endocrinologist.
- Chuck Hamilton, 84, Canadian ice hockey player (Hershey Bears, Montreal Canadiens, St. Louis Blues).
- Roric Harrison, 76, American baseball player (Atlanta Braves, Baltimore Orioles, Minnesota Twins).
- Ryszard Jedliński, 70, Polish Olympic handball player (1980).
- Barry M. Jensen, 78, American politician, member of the South Dakota House of Representatives (2001–2002, 2005–2006).
- Muhammad Mahdi al-Khorasani, 94, Iraqi grand ayatollah.
- Aleksandr Khvan, 65, Russian film director (Dyuba-Dyuba, It Is Easy to Die, Carmen) and actor.
- Robert Knapp, 77, American classicist, pancreatic cancer.
- Hennadiy Lahuta, 49, Ukrainian politician, governor of Kherson Oblast (2021–2022).
- Roger Lemelin, 69, Canadian ice hockey player (Kansas City Scouts, Colorado Rockies).
- Arthur Longbottom, 90, English footballer (Queens Park Rangers, Port Vale, Oxford United).
- Sami Azara al-Majun, 91, Iraqi politician.
- Harris Mayer, 102, American physicist (Manhattan Project).
- John McDonough, 71, British construction industry executive, chairman of Carillion (2001–2011).
- Ronnie McKinnon, 83, Scottish footballer (Rangers, Durban United, national team).
- Bengt Nåjde, 81, Swedish Olympic runner (1964).
- Kevin Neale, 78, Australian football player (St Kilda) and coach (Ainslie, Central District), complications from Alzheimer's disease.
- Sikkil Neela, 85, Indian flutist (Sikkil Sisters).
- Willi Padge, 79, German rower, Olympic champion (1960).
- Aníbal de Peña, 90, Dominican singer, pianist and composer.
- Ali Asghar Rahmani Khalili, 79, Iranian politician, MP (1980–1988, 2000–2004).
- Rudolf Wickel, 90, German engineer and politician, member of the Landtag of North Rhine-Westphalia (1985–1995).

=== 18 ===
- Riaz Ahmed, 84, Indian volleyball player.
- Harold Baker, 93, American jurist, judge of the U.S. District Court for Eastern Illinois (1978–1979) and Central Illinois (1979–2022), and the FISA Court (1998–2005).
- Evgeny Bazhanov, 76, Russian political scientist and diplomat.
- Henry Boucha, 72, American ice hockey player (Detroit Red Wings, Minnesota North Stars), Olympic silver medalist (1972).
- Krzysztof Bujar, 61, Polish Olympic ice hockey player (1992).
- Byun Hee-bong, 81, South Korean actor (Barking Dogs Never Bite, The Host, Okja), pancreatic cancer.
- Constance Clayton, 89, American educator and civic leader.
- Leina'ala Drummond, 77, American model, Miss Hawaii (1964), cancer.
- Felice Farina, 69, Italian film director (Condominio).
- Edward Ferry, 82, American rower, Olympic champion (1964).
- Jürgen Grimming, 85, German businessman and politician, MP (1975–1976).
- Grimanesa Jiménez, 86, Chilean actress (La Colorina, Papi Ricky).
- Brereton C. Jones, 84, American horse breeder and politician, lieutenant governor (1987–1991) and governor of Kentucky (1991–1995).
- Frieder Lippmann, 87, German politician, member of the Landtag of Thuringia (1990–2004).
- Seiji Mataichi, 79, Japanese politician, MP (2001–2019).
- Joe Matt, 60, American cartoonist (Peepshow), heart attack.
- Peter W. Mullin, 82, American businessman, founder of M Financial Group.
- Chandran Nair, 77–78, Singaporean poet, heart attack.
- Zdeněk Návrat, 92, Czech Olympic ice hockey player (1956).
- Rolf Olander, 89, Swedish Olympic swimmer (1952).
- Tarachand Patel, 81, Indian politician, MP (1999–2004).
- Marinho Peres, 76, Brazilian football player (Barcelona, national team) and manager (Belenenses).
- Jen Powley, 45, Canadian writer and disability advocate.
- Kate de Romero, 86, Puerto Rican first lady (1977–1985).
- David Sobey, 92, Canadian businessman and philanthropist.
- Syed Salahuddin Zaki, 77, Bangladeshi film director (Ghuddi) and screenwriter (Nodir Naam Modhumoti, Lalsalu).

=== 19 ===
- Babu, 60, Indian actor (En Uyir Thozhan, Perum Pulli, Thayamma).
- Serhiy Bashkyrov, 64, Ukrainian football player (Dnipro Dnipropetrovsk, Metalurh Zaporizhzhia) and manager.
- Rónán Mac Aodha Bhuí, 53, Irish broadcaster (RTÉ Raidió na Gaeltachta).
- Jimmy Brohan, 88, Irish hurler (Blackrock, Cork).
- Romeo Callejo Sr., 86, Filipino judge, associate justice of the Supreme Court (2002–2007).
- Slobodan Čendić, 85, Serbian football manager (FC Schalke 04, 1. FC Saarbrücken, Alemannia Aachen).
- Billy Chemirmir, 50, Kenyan convicted murderer, homicide.
- Richard S. Davies, 76, American politician.
- Lou Deprijck, 77, Belgian singer-songwriter ("Ça plane pour moi"), musician (Two Man Sound) and record producer.
- Brendan Devlin, 92, Irish language scholar.
- Vitaly Dubko, 87, Russian Olympic trampolining coach (2000, 2004).
- JoAnne A. Epps, 72, American legal scholar, president of Temple University (since 2023).
- Per Gahrton, 80, Swedish politician, MP (1976–1979, 1994–1995) and MEP (1995–2004), founder of the Green Party.
- Stephen Gould, 61, American heldentenor, cholangiocarcinoma.
- James F. Hoge Jr., 87, American journalist and publisher (The Chicago Sun-Times, New York Daily News, Foreign Affairs).
- Egil Johansen, 61, Norwegian footballer (Vålerenga, national team), complications from amyotrophic lateral sclerosis.
- Severino Lojodice, 89, Italian footballer (Cremonese, Roma, Brescia).
- Donlin Long, 89, American neurosurgeon.
- Johannes Moe, 97, Norwegian engineer.
- Likpalimor Kwajo Tawiah, 63, Ghanaian politician, MP (1993–2013).
- Hildegarde Neil, 84, British actress (Antony and Cleopatra, A Touch of Class, England Made Me), cancer.
- Ellis Sandoz, 92, American academic and political scientist.
- G. Peter Scott, 78–79, British-American mathematician, cancer.
- Buddy Teevens, 66, American football coach (Dartmouth Big Green), injuries sustained in a traffic collision.
- Sir John Ure, 92, British diplomat, ambassador to Cuba (1979–1981), Brazil (1984–1987) and Sweden (1987–1991).
- Gianni Vattimo, 87, Italian philosopher (Hermeneutic Communism) and politician, MEP (1999–2004, 2009–2014).
- E. J. Wells, 67, American musician and songwriter, cardiac arrest.

=== 20 ===
- Erika Anderson, 34, American mechanical engineer.
- Katherine Anderson, 79, American singer (The Marvelettes).
- Zeenat Barkatullah, Bangladeshi dancer and television actress.
- Yaacov Bergman, 78, Israeli conductor (Walla Walla Symphony).
- Martin Bielz, 87, Romanian Olympic rower (1960).
- Josef Bugl, 90, German politician, MP (1980–1987).
- Enzo Cavalli, 86, Italian Olympic triple jumper (1960).
- Dick Clark, 95, American politician, member of the U.S. Senate (1973–1979).
- Maddy Cusack, 27, English footballer (Aston Villa, Birmingham City, Sheffield United), suicide.
- Elaine Devry, 93, American actress (The Atomic Kid, China Doll, A Guide for the Married Man).
- Camille Dimmer, 84, Luxembourgish footballer (Anderlecht, national team) and politician, deputy (1984–1994).
- Bobby Durnbaugh, 90, American baseball player (Cincinnati Redlegs).
- Stephen Erickson, 83, American philosopher, complications from Parkinson's disease.
- Herbert Faust, 96, German politician, member of the Landtag of North Rhine-Westphalia (1970–1985).
- Ruth Fuchs, 76, German politician and athlete, Olympic champion (1972, 1976).
- Renée Hudon, 81, Canadian radio and television journalist (Radio-Canada).
- Shuntarō Itō, 93, Japanese science historian.
- Jerzy Kowalski, 86, Polish Olympic sprinter (1960).
- David Mack, 69, American politician, member of the South Carolina House of Representatives (1997–2020).
- Lucy Morgan, 82, American journalist (Tampa Bay Times), Pulitzer Prize winner (1985), complications from a fall.
- Erwin Olaf, 64, Dutch photographer, complications from a lung transplant and emphysema.
- Graeme Page, 80, Australian politician, member (1976–1996) and speaker (1992–1996) of the Tasmanian House of Assembly.
- Odilon Polleunis, 80, Belgian footballer (S.T.V.V., R.W.D. Molenbeek, national team), heart failure.
- Jack Sandlin, 72, American politician, member of the Indiana Senate (since 2016).
- Phil Sellers, 69, American basketball player (Detroit Pistons, BV Amstelveen), stroke.
- Thet Lwin, 83, Burmese politician, minister of ethnic affairs (2016–2021), heart attack.
- Hollis Watkins, 82, American civil rights activist.

=== 21 ===
- Yoel Alroy, 93, Israeli footballer (Maccabi Netanya) and politician, mayor of Netanya (1983–1993).
- Sabine Bothe, 63, German Olympic handball player (1992).
- Kevin Byrne, 73–74, Australian politician, mayor of Cairns (1992–1995, 2000–2008).
- Alexandra Can, 70, Moldovan politician.
- Linda Cardozo, 73, British gynaecologist.
- John Donald, 94, British jeweller.
- Arlen Erdahl, 92, American politician, Minnesota secretary of state (1971–1975), member of the Minnesota (1963–1971) and U.S. House of Representatives (1979–1983), complications from Alzheimer's disease.
- Stevie Faye, 95, British comedian (The Comedians). (death announced on this date)
- Maya Georgieva, 68, Bulgarian volleyball player, Olympic bronze medallist (1980).
- Hubert Ginn, 76, American football player (Miami Dolphins, Baltimore Colts, Oakland Raiders).
- José Lemos, 61, Spanish footballer (Celta Vigo, Real Valladolid).
- Brian Merrett, 78, Canadian architect and activist, amyotrophic lateral sclerosis.
- Akhil Mishra, 67, Indian actor (Hazaaron Khwaishein Aisi, Gandhi, My Father, 3 Idiots), fall.
- Aldo Neri, 92, Argentine doctor and politician, minister of health and social action (1983–1986).
- Walewska Oliveira, 43, Brazilian volleyball player, Olympic champion (2008).
- Barry Palmer, 83, American politician, member of the New Hampshire House of Representatives (2010–2012, 2012–2014), cancer.
- Luigi Rinaldi, 85, Italian trade unionist and politician, deputy (1983–1994).
- Ruth Ryste, 91, Norwegian trade unionist and politician, minister of social affairs (1976–1979).
- Anthony Castillo Sanchez, 44, American convicted murderer, executed by lethal injection.
- Jeremy Silman, 69, American chess master.
- Robert W. Smith, 64, American trumpeter and composer, complications from heart surgery.
- Gaetano Tanti, 66, Maltese trade unionist, president of the UHM (since 1998).
- Saroja Vaidyanathan, 86, Indian Bharatanatyam dancer and choreographer, cancer.
- Ignacio Vázquez Torres, 84, Mexican politician, three-term deputy, gubernatorial candidate, and senator.
- Eugenia Viteri, 95, Ecuadorian writer and women's rights activist.

=== 22 ===
- Maria Carmem Barbosa, 76, Brazilian playwright and screenwriter (Olho no Olho, Salsa e Merengue).
- Khemraj Bhatta 'Mayalu', 76, Nepalese politician, MP (1999–2008), cancer.
- Peter Brand, 76, British politician, MP (1997–2001).
- Olga Chorens, 99, Cuban singer and actress.
- Bernardino Fabbian, 73, Italian footballer (Internazionale, Foggia).
- Bayani Fernando, 77, Filipino politician, chairman of the MMDA (2002–2009), member of the House of Representatives (2016–2022) and secretary of public works and highways (2003), fall.
- Bob Glasgow, 81, American politician, member of the Texas Senate (1980–1993).
- François Glorieux, 91, Belgian conductor (Ballet of the 20th Century), composer, and musicologist.
- Sharar Haidar, 52, Iraqi football player (national team) and executive, chairman of Al-Karkh (since 2003), heart attack.
- Mike Henderson, 70, American singer-songwriter ("Broken Halos", "Starting Over") and musician (The SteelDrivers).
- Sir Patu Hohepa, 87, New Zealand Māori language academic.
- Peter Horton, 82, Austrian guitarist, composer and singer.
- Evelyn Fox Keller, 87, American physicist, author, and feminist.
- Stan Klees, 91, Canadian businessman (RPM).
- Pava LaPere, 26, American businesswoman and entrepreneur, blunt force trauma.
- Giovanni Lodetti, 81, Italian footballer (Milan, Sampdoria, national team).
- Américo Lopes, 90, Portuguese footballer (Porto, Boavista, national team).
- Geir Lundestad, 78, Norwegian historian, member of the Norwegian Academy of Science and Letters and director of the Norwegian Nobel Institute (1990–2014).
- Mark Manges, 67, American football player (St. Louis Cardinals, Hamilton Tiger-Cats).
- Alejandro Meerapfel, 54, Argentine operatic baritone, heart attack.
- Cristina Morán, 93, Uruguayan actress (Anina, Alelí), television presenter and journalist.
- Giorgio Napolitano, 98, Italian politician, president (2006–2015), minister of the interior (1996–1998) and president of the Chamber of Deputies (1992–1994).
- Joseph D. Novak, 92, American educator and professor.
- Boris Ostanin, 76, Russian writer and essayist, co-founder of the Andrei Bely Prize.
- Jeff Ragsdale, 51, American author (Jeff, One Lonely Guy) and filmmaker, cancer.
- Dame Teresa Rees, 74, British social scientist, cancer.
- Selwyn Romilly, 83, Canadian judge, justice of the Supreme Court (1995–2015) and Provincial Court (1974–1978) of British Columbia.
- Bruce Russett, 88, American political scientist.
- Dieter Schneider, 86, German lyricist.
- Wallace B. Smith, 94, American Community of Christ preacher, prophet-president (1978–1996).
- Vladimir Sokhov, 84, Russian politician, MP (1995–2003).
- Sergey Solovyov, 68, Russian mathematician.
- Murray Stenson, 74, American bartender.
- Goodloe Sutton, 84, American newspaper editor, publisher and owner.
- Bernard Toublanc-Michel, 95, French film director and screenwriter.
- Joanne Verger, 93, American politician.

=== 23 ===
- Daniel Okyem Aboagye, 49, Ghanaian politician, MP (2016–2020).
- Edwin Nicholas Arnold, 82, British herpetologist, heart failure.
- Jim Courtney, 87, American politician, member of the Montana House of Representatives (1977–1979).
- Eugenio Elorduy Walther, 82, Mexican politician, governor of Baja California (2001–2007).
- Lucie Julia, 96, Guadeloupean writer, women's rights activist and social worker.
- Nic Kerdiles, 29, American ice hockey player (Anaheim Ducks), traffic collision.
- Terry Kirkman, 83, American musician (The Association) and songwriter ("Cherish", "Everything That Touches You"), heart failure.
- Víctor Manuel López Forero, 92, Colombian Roman Catholic prelate, bishop of Socorro y San Gil (1980–1985), archbishop of Nueva Pamplona (1994–1998) and Bucaramanga (1998–2009).
- Danny Morris, 77, American baseball player (Minnesota Twins).
- Cheryl Murray, 71, English actress (Coronation Street).
- Toivo Öhman, 90, Swedish Olympic diver (1952, 1960).
- John S. Saul, 85, Canadian academic and activist, cancer.
- Noël Tijou, 81, French Olympic long-distance runner (1972).
- Skadi Walter, 59, German Olympic speed skater (1984).
- Paul Woodruff, 80, American classicist and academic, bronchiectasis.
- Chloe Wright, 75, New Zealand businesswoman and philanthropist.

=== 24 ===
- Ray Anderson, 96, American journalist (The New York Times).
- Felix Ayo, 90, Spanish-born Italian violinist (I Musici).
- Keith Baxter, 90, Welsh actor (Chimes at Midnight, Ash Wednesday, Merlin), heart attack.
- Viktor Belenko, 76, Russian-born American fighter pilot.
- Fritz Bing, 89, South African cricketer.
- Dorra Bouzid, 90, Tunisian feminist and art critic.
- Roland Cantzler, 92, German jurist and politician, MP (1972).
- Léon Fatous, 97, French politician, MEP (1984–1989) and senator (1992–2001).
- Alfonso Ferrufino, 81, Bolivian lawyer, sociologist, and politician, minister of government (2003–2004).
- Tim Foley, 75, American football player (Miami Dolphins).
- K. G. George, 77, Indian film director (Yavanika, Panchavadi Palam, Adaminte Vaariyellu) and screenwriter, stroke.
- Ced Gyles, 96, Canadian football player (Calgary Stampeders).
- John Hayes, 84, Australian rugby league player (Western Suburbs, New South Wales).
- Zvi Hecker, 92, Polish-born Israeli architect.
- Wani Laohakiat, 102, Thai beauty peagant.
- Silvi Liiva, 82, Estonian printmaker.
- Hani Naqshabandi, 60, Saudi journalist (Sayidaty, The Majalla), writer and novelist.
- Barry Olivier, 87, American guitar instructor, founder of the Berkeley Folk Music Festival.
- Leon Phillips, 88, New Zealand chemist.
- Steven Pim, Papua New Guinean politician, MP (since 2022), heart attack.
- Ray Reynolds, 87, Australian cricketer (Queensland).
- Keith Riglin, 66, British Anglican bishop, bishop of Argyll and The Isles (since 2021).
- Chuck Romine, 87, American politician, member of the West Virginia House of Delegates (1968–1974, 1998–2000, 2016–2018).
- William B. Russel, 77, American chemical engineer.
- James Skala, 93, American basketball player and coach (Eastern Michigan).
- Reiky de Valk, 23, Dutch actor (Skam NL, Hunter Street), suicide.
- Allan Weisbecker, 75, American surfer, novelist, and screenwriter (Crime Story).

=== 25 ===
- Mubarak Abdullah Al-Ahmad Al-Sabah, 93, Kuwaiti politician.
- Burkey Belser, 76, American graphic designer (nutrition facts label), bladder cancer.
- Eugenio Calabi, 100, Italian-born American mathematician (Calabi conjecture, Calabi–Yau manifold, Calabi flow).
- Bob Dahl, 54, American football player (Cleveland Browns, Washington Redskins).
- Atis Deksnis, 50, Latvian politician, MP (since 2022).
- Ron D. Givens, 71, American politician, member of the Texas House of Representatives (1985–1989).
- Gualberto Gutiérrez, 83, Uruguayan Olympic boxer (1960).
- Andriy Ivanchuk, 50, Ukrainian politician, MP (since 2012), thrombosis.
- Makoto Katamine, 67, Japanese politician.
- György Kottán, 76, Hungarian-Austrian football player (MTK) and manager (Bangladesh national team, Pakistan national team).
- Severino Lucini, 93, Italian Olympic rower (1960).
- Zoleka Mandela, 43, South African writer, cancer.
- Harry Marsh, 97, English chemist.
- David McCallum, 90, Scottish actor (The Man from U.N.C.L.E., NCIS, The Great Escape) and musician.
- Osman Mema, 84, Albanian footballer (17 Nëntori Tirana, Partizani).
- Matteo Messina Denaro, 61, Italian mobster, head of the Sicilian Mafia (since 2006), colon cancer.
- Luigi Minchillo, 68, Italian Olympic boxer (1976), heart attack.
- Seth Walker Norman, 89, American judge and politician.
- Harry Poole, 88, English footballer (Port Vale).
- Juhani Salovaara, 91, Finnish Olympic sailor (1964).
- Gerry Shamray, 66, American comic book artist (American Splendor).
- Nevenka Tadić, 97, Serbian neuropsychiatrist.
- Anneke Uittenbosch, 93, Dutch harpsichordist.
- Obie Wilchcombe, 64, Bahamian politician.
- Yevgeny Yasin, 89, Russian economist, minister of economy (1994–1997).

=== 26 ===
- Raynald Blais, 69, Canadian politician, MP (2004–2011).
- Sir Michael Bonallack, 88, English golf administrator.
- Vittoria Cesarini, 91, Italian Olympic sprinter (1952).
- Asgeir Dølplads, 91, Norwegian ski jumper.
- Sandra Dorsey, 83, American actress (Sleepaway Camp III: Teenage Wasteland, Gordy, Dumb and Dumber To), director and writer, pancreatic cancer.
- Teri Hope, 85, American model and actress (Fun in Acapulco, Force of Impulse).
- David Hughes, 65, English footballer (Worcester City, Lincoln City, Scunthorpe United). (death announced on this date)
- Serhii Kondratevskyi, 58, Ukrainian businessman and politician, people's deputy (1998–2002).
- Maurice Leitch, 90, Northern Irish author (Silver's City, Chinese Whispers).
- Bruce McWilliams, 67, American business executive.
- Hisae Mitsuishi, 96, Japanese politician, member of the House of Councillors (1989–1995).
- Geof Motley, 88, Australian football player (Port Adelaide, South Australia) and coach (North Adelaide).
- Jayantha Paranathala, 72, Sri Lankan cricketer (Burgher Recreation Club, national team) and police officer.
- Henri Perly, 95, French road racing cyclist (Alcyon).
- Manfred Pointner, 80, German lawyer and politician, member of the Landtag of Bavaria (2008–2013).
- Brooks Robinson, 86, American Hall of Fame baseball player (Baltimore Orioles), World Series champion (1966, 1970), heart disease.
- Stanisław Szymecki, 99, Polish Roman Catholic prelate, bishop of Kielce (1981–1993) and archbishop of Białystok (1993–2000).
- Hıfzı Topuz, 100, Turkish journalist (Vatan, Milliyet), travel writer and novelist.
- Thelma Turner, 94, New Zealand netball player (national team).

=== 27 ===
- Jesús Aranzabal, 83, Spanish racing cyclist.
- Pat Arrowsmith, 93, English peace activist, co-founder of the Campaign for Nuclear Disarmament.
- Donna Becker, 91, American baseball player (Kalamazoo Lassies).
- Bob Blasi, 93, American football coach (Northern Colorado).
- Christoph Prinz zu Schleswig-Holstein, 74, German aristocrat, head of the House of Oldenburg (since 1980).
- Sabina Citron, 95, Polish-Canadian Holocaust survivor.
- Hezekiah Leonard Clark Jr., 86, American master sergeant.
- Ralph B. D'Agostino, 83, American biostatistician.
- Dom Famularo, 70, American drummer.
- Ed Fancher, 100, American newspaper publisher and psychologist.
- Seda Fettahoğlu, 44, Turkish actress (Bir Zamanlar Çukurova).
- Jim Forrest, 79, Scottish footballer (Rangers, Aberdeen, national team).
- Djovi Gally, 67, Togolese human rights lawyer and politician.
- Sir Michael Gambon, 82, Irish-born British actor (Harry Potter, Gosford Park, The Singing Detective), four-time BAFTA winner, pneumonia.
- Volodymyr Koman, 59, Ukrainian footballer (Zakarpattia Uzhhorod, Bukovyna Chernivtsi, national team).
- Urszula Koszut, 82, Polish operatic soprano.
- Catherine Lachens, 78, French actress (Je suis timide mais je me soigne, The Medic, Bright Days Ahead).
- Aziz Pahad, 82, South African anti-apartheid activist and politician, MP (1994–2008).
- Fayez Rashid, 73, Palestinian political writer.
- John Roncz, 75, American aerodynamicist.
- Soumendu Roy, 90, Indian cinematographer (Teen Kanya, Rabindranath Tagore, Aranyer Din Ratri).
- Bob Sheridan, 79, American boxing (WGBS) and MMA commentator.
- Gary Simpson, 64, English footballer (Chesterfield, Chester).
- Donal Smith, 89, New Zealand Olympic athlete (1960) and academic of English literature.
- Slobodan Štambuk, 82, Croatian Roman Catholic prelate, bishop of Hvar-Brač-Vis (1989–2018).
- John Tembo, 91, Malawian economist and politician, minister of finance (1964–1969) and governor of the Reserve Bank (1971–1984), pneumonia.
- Christine Terraillon, 80, French Olympic alpine skier.
- Wang Wen-hsing, 84, Taiwanese novelist.
- Ryuzo Yanagimachi, 95, Japanese-born American embryologist.
- Vasily Zimenok, 89, Kazakh miner and politician, member of the Soviet of the Union (1984–1989). (death announced on this date)

=== 28 ===
- Stephen Ackles, 57, Norwegian musician.
- J. Scott Armstrong, 86, American futurologist and author.
- Ted Bachman, 72, American football player (Calgary Stampeders, Seattle Seahawks, Miami Dolphins).
- John Bandler, 81, Canadian electrical engineer and academic.
- Louis Bernatchez, 63, Canadian geneticist.
- Sir Mervyn Brown, 100, British historian and diplomat, ambassador to Madagascar (1967–1970), high commissioner to Tanzania (1975–1978) and Nigeria (1979–1983).
- Glenn Bujnoch, 69, American football player (Cincinnati Bengals, Tampa Bay Buccaneers).
- Marshall Cook, 83, New Zealand architect.
- Ashwin Dani, 79, Indian paint industry businessman, co-founder of Asian Paints.
- Ion Druță, 95, Moldovan writer and poet, member of the Romanian Academy.
- Lois Fowler, 68, Canadian curler, ovarian cancer.
- Eric Hammill, 91, Canadian politician, Prince Edward Island MLA (1996–2003).
- Dean House, 85, American politician.
- Sissel Lange-Nielsen, 92, Norwegian writer.
- Viliami Moala, 30, American football player (California Golden Bears).
- Ganira Pashayeva, 48, Azerbaijani politician and poet, MP (since 2005).
- Bob Priddy, 83, American baseball player (Atlanta Braves, San Francisco Giants, Chicago White Sox).
- Gennady Raikov, 84, Russian politician, MP (1995–2007).
- Najah Salam, 92, Lebanese singer and actress.
- M. S. Swaminathan, 98, Indian agronomist and geneticist (Green Revolution in India), MP (2007–2013).

=== 29 ===
- Roy Boudreau, 76, Canadian teacher and politician, speaker of the Legislative Assembly of New Brunswick (2007–2010).
- Demetrio Carceller Coll, 93, Portuguese beverage industry executive (S.A. Damm).
- Mayra Copas, 28, Bolivian beauty pageant titleholder, pancreatic cancer.
- Bob Coronado, 87, American football player (Pittsburgh Steelers).
- Rawdon Dalrymple, 92, Australian public servant and diplomat, ambassador to the United States (1985–1989).
- Jon Fausty, 74, American sound and recording engineer.
- Dianne Feinstein, 90, American politician, member of the U.S. Senate (since 1992), mayor of San Francisco (1978–1988).
- Hernando Guerra García, 60, Peruvian businessman and politician, MP (since 2021).
- Michał Głowiński, 88, Polish philologist, member of the Polish Academy of Sciences and of Arts and Sciences.
- Joyce Grable, 70, American professional wrestler (NWA).
- Neville Harper, 97, Australian politician, Queensland MLA (1980–1992).
- Saad Eddin Ibrahim, 84, Egyptian sociologist.
- Joseph E. Johnson, 90, American academic, president of the University of Tennessee system (1991–1999).
- Lucjan Józefowicz, 88, Polish Olympic track cyclist (1964).
- Anne Kahane, 99, Austrian-born Canadian sculptor.
- Richie Poulton, 61, New Zealand clinical psychologist, director of the Dunedin Study (since 2000), salivary gland cancer.
- Maurice Racca, 100, French Olympic sport shooter (1956).
- Harpal Randhawa, Indian investor and businessman, plane crash.
- Kamal Ruhayyim, 76, Egyptian writer (Diary of a Jewish Muslim, Days in the Diaspora, Menorahs and Minarets).
- Kurt Schumacher, 70, American football player (New Orleans Saints, Tampa Bay Buccaneers).
- Ed Young, 91, Chinese-born American illustrator.
- Yu Zhenwu, 92, Chinese air force general, commander of PLAAF (1994–1996).

=== 30 ===
- Youssouf Bakayoko, 80, Ivorian politician and diplomat, minister of foreign affairs (2006–2010).
- Russell Batiste Jr., 57, American drummer (The Meters, Vida Blue, Papa Grows Funk), heart attack.
- Praful Bhavsar, 97, Indian rocket scientist.
- Abdus Sattar Bhuiyan, 84, Bangladeshi politician, MP (1979–1982, 1996–2001, since 2019).
- Thomas Danneberg, 81, German actor (Code Name: Wild Geese, Commando Leopard) and dubber, stroke.
- Ron East, 80, American football player (Dallas Cowboys, San Diego Chargers, Cleveland Browns).
- Michael Flynn, 75, American author (The Forest of Time, Fallen Angels).
- Gene W. Glenn, 94, American politician, member of the Iowa House of Representatives (1965–1967) and Iowa Senate (1967–1979).
- Galip Haktanır, 102, Turkish footballer (1948 Olympics, national team).
- Ove Johansson, 75, Swedish-born American football player (Philadelphia Eagles).
- A. K. M. Shahjahan Kamal, 73, Bangladeshi politician, minister of civil aviation and tourism (2018–2019) and MP (since 2014).
- Khaled Khalifa, 59, Syrian novelist (In Praise of Hatred, No Knives in the Kitchens of This City, Death is Hard Work), screenwriter, and poet, heart attack.
- Vitali Konyayev, 86, Russian actor (Silence, Clear Skies, The Last Day).
- Erick Morillo, 23, Peruvian footballer (César Vallejo), traffic collision.
- Dame Alison Quentin-Baxter, 93, New Zealand lawyer.
- Russell Sherman, 93, American classical pianist.
- Chris Snow, 42, Canadian ice hockey executive (Calgary Flames), complications from amyotropic lateral sclerosis.
- Wichit Srisa-an, 88, Thai academic administrator and politician, minister of education (2006–2008), rector of Thammasat University (1977) and Khon Kaen University (1978).
- Sukumar, 91, Indian satirist and cartoonist (Kerala Kaumudi).
- Eurico dos Santos Veloso, 90, Brazilian Roman Catholic prelate, auxiliary bishop of Juiz de Fora (1987–1991), bishop of Luz (1994–2001) and archbishop of Juiz de Fora (2001–2009).
