= Tanti (disambiguation) =

Tanti is a Hindu caste traditionally occupied in Cloth weaving and trading in India . It may also refer to:

== People ==
- Bhadreswar Tanti, Indian politician
- Frank Tanti (born 1949), Australian politician
- Gaetano Tanti, Maltese trade unionist
- Joe Tanti (born 1959), Maltese radio and TV presenter
- Keith Azzopardi Tanti (born 1984), Maltese politician
- Peppino Tanti (born 1941), Italian weightlifter
- Tony Tanti (born 1963), Canadian ice hockey player
- Tulsi Tanti, Indian businessman

== Places ==
- Tanti, Córdoba, a town in Argentina
- Tanti Park railway station in Australia
