= Kwak Soon-ok =

South Korean singer (1932–2023)

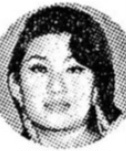
- Kwak in 1975
- Born: 곽순옥; 20 March 1932; Jilin, Manchukuo
- Died: 12 September 2023 (aged 91); Seoul, South Korea
- Other name: Kwak Sun Ok
- Occupation: Singer

Korean name
- Hangul: 곽순옥
- Hanja: 郭順玉
- RR: Gwak Sunok
- MR: Kwak Sunok

Kwak Soon-ok (Korean: 곽순옥; 20 March 1932 – 12 September 2023), also spelled Kwak Sun Ok, was a Chinese-born South Korean singer.

== Life and career ==
Born in Jilin, Soon-ok moved to South Korea shortly before the Korean War. She debuted as a club singer in 1951, performing for the Eighth United States Army. One year later, she started working as a musical theatre actress. Also a lyricist, her major hit was the song "누가 이사람을 모르시나요" ("Does Anyone Know This Person"), which was the theme song of the radio series 남과 북 ('North and South') and of the 1965 film adaptation with the same title, and which was covered by numerous artists, notably by Patty Kim in a 1983 successful version. In spite of her success, in 1965 she moved to Hong Kong and abandoned her musical activities. She eventually moved to the United States, before returning to Seoul in her late years. She made her last appearance in 2021, in the MBN program Spotlight on the World. Soon-ok died on 12 September 2023, at the age of 91.
