= Michele Miraglia =

Italian executive and politician (1935–2023)

Member of the Senate of the Republic of Italy
- In office 5 July 1976 – 11 July 1983
- Constituency: Brindisi

Personal details
- Born: 5 February 1935 Taranto, Italy
- Died: 2 September 2023 (aged 88) Carovigno, Italy
- Party: PCI
- Occupation: Executive

Michele Miraglia (5 February 1935 – 2 September 2023) was an Italian executive and politician. A member of the Communist Party, he served in the Senate of the Republic from 1976 to 1983.

Miraglia died in Carovigno on 2 September 2023, at the age of 88.
