= Denis Monette =

Canadian journalist and author (1936–2023)

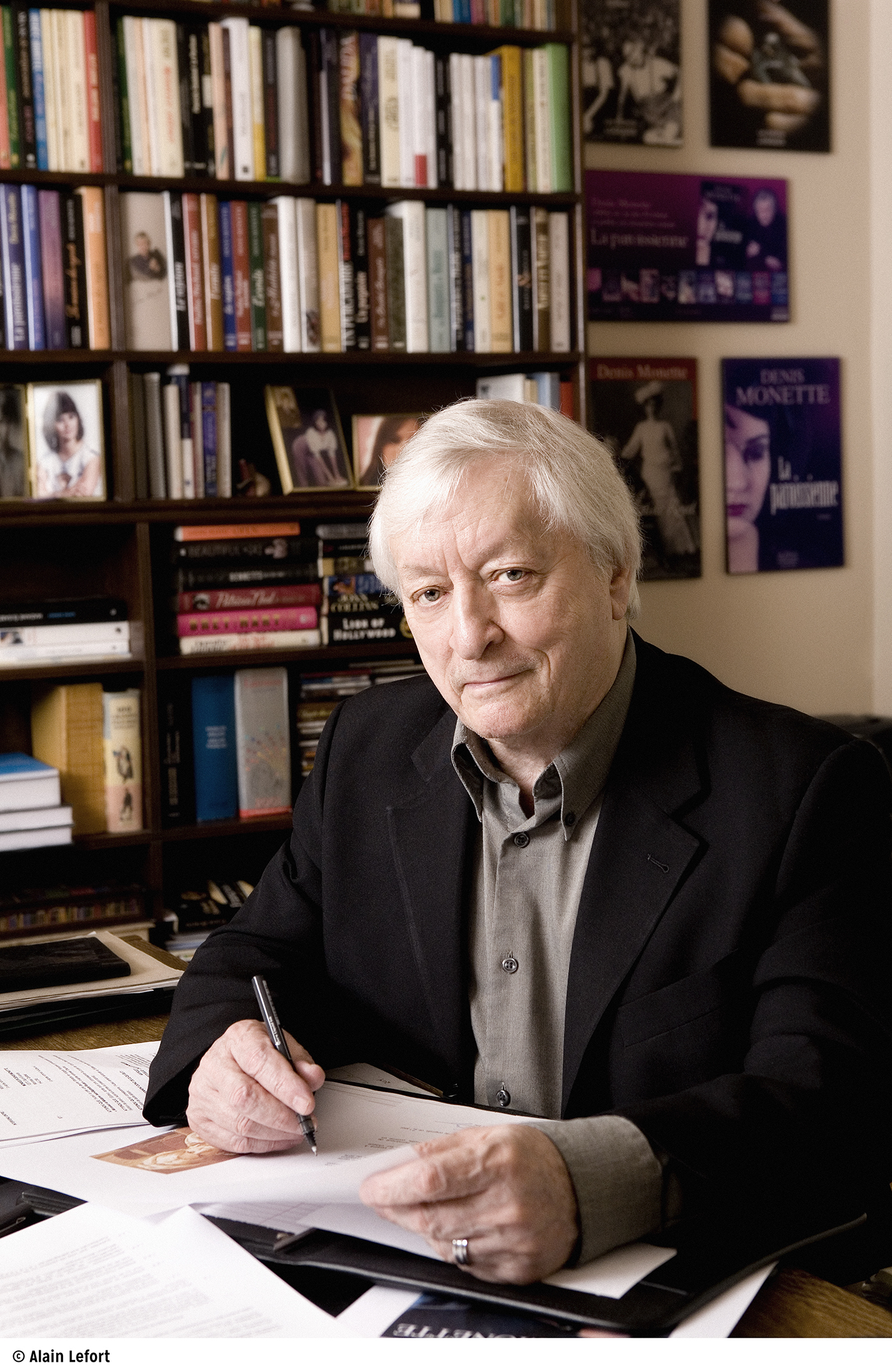
- Monette in 2014
- Born: 6 December 1936; Montreal, Quebec, Canada
- Died: 4 September 2023 (aged 86); Montreal, Quebec, Canada
- Education: Collège André-Grasset
- Occupations: Journalist, author

Denis Monette (6 December 1936 – 4 September 2023) was a Canadian journalist and author.

Monette studied at the Collège André-Grasset and became an editorial columnist for Le Lundi. After serving as director of Québecmag, he left journalism and became a writer. The author of numerous books, he was known for his success with his first novel.

Monette died at the Hôpital du Sacré-Cœur de Montréal on 4 September 2023, at the age of 86.

== Works ==
- Au fil des sentiments... mes plus beaux billets (1985)
- Pour un peu d'espoir... mes plus beaux billets (1986)
- Un Journaliste à Hollywood (1987)
- Les Chemins de la vie... mes plus beaux billets (1989)
- Adèle et Amélie (1990)
- Le partage du cœur (1992)
- Les parapluies du diable (1993)
- Les Bouquets de Noces (1995)
- Au fil des sentiments (1996)
- Pour un peu d'espoir (1996)
- Un purgatoire (1996)
- Au fil des sentiments (1996)
- Les chemins de la vie (1996)
- Les parapluies du diable (1997)
- Marie Mousseau, 1937-1957 (1997)
- Au gré des émotions (1998)
- L'ermite (1998)
- Et Mathilde chantait (1999)
- Pauline Pinchaud, servante (2000)
- Le rejeton (2001)
- La maison des regrets (2003)
- Par un si beau matin (2005)
- La Paroissienne (2007)
- M. et Mme Jean-Baptiste Rouet (2008)
- Quatre jours de pluie (2010)
- Le jardin du docteur Des Œillets (2011)
- Les délaissées (2012)
- La veuve du boulanger (2014)
- Ensemble pour toujours (2015)
- Les Fautifs (2016)
- Les enfants de Mathias (2017)
- La maîtresse de l'horloger (2019)
- Pardonnez-nous Seigneur (2020)
- Benjamine et son destin (2021)
- Ignacio et ses femmes (2023)

== Honors ==
- Les Bouquets de Noces, nominated at Renaud-Bray in 1995
- Adèle et Amélie, nominated at Renaud-Bray in 1997
- Prix du public of the Salon du livre de Montréal
- Honorory invite to the Salon du livre de Montréal (2009)
- Prix du public of the Salon du livre de Trois-Rivières (2011)
