= Murray G. Hall =

Canadian germanist (1947–2023)

Murray G. Hall (25 May 1947 – 4 September 2023) was a Canadian Germanist and specialist in literature.

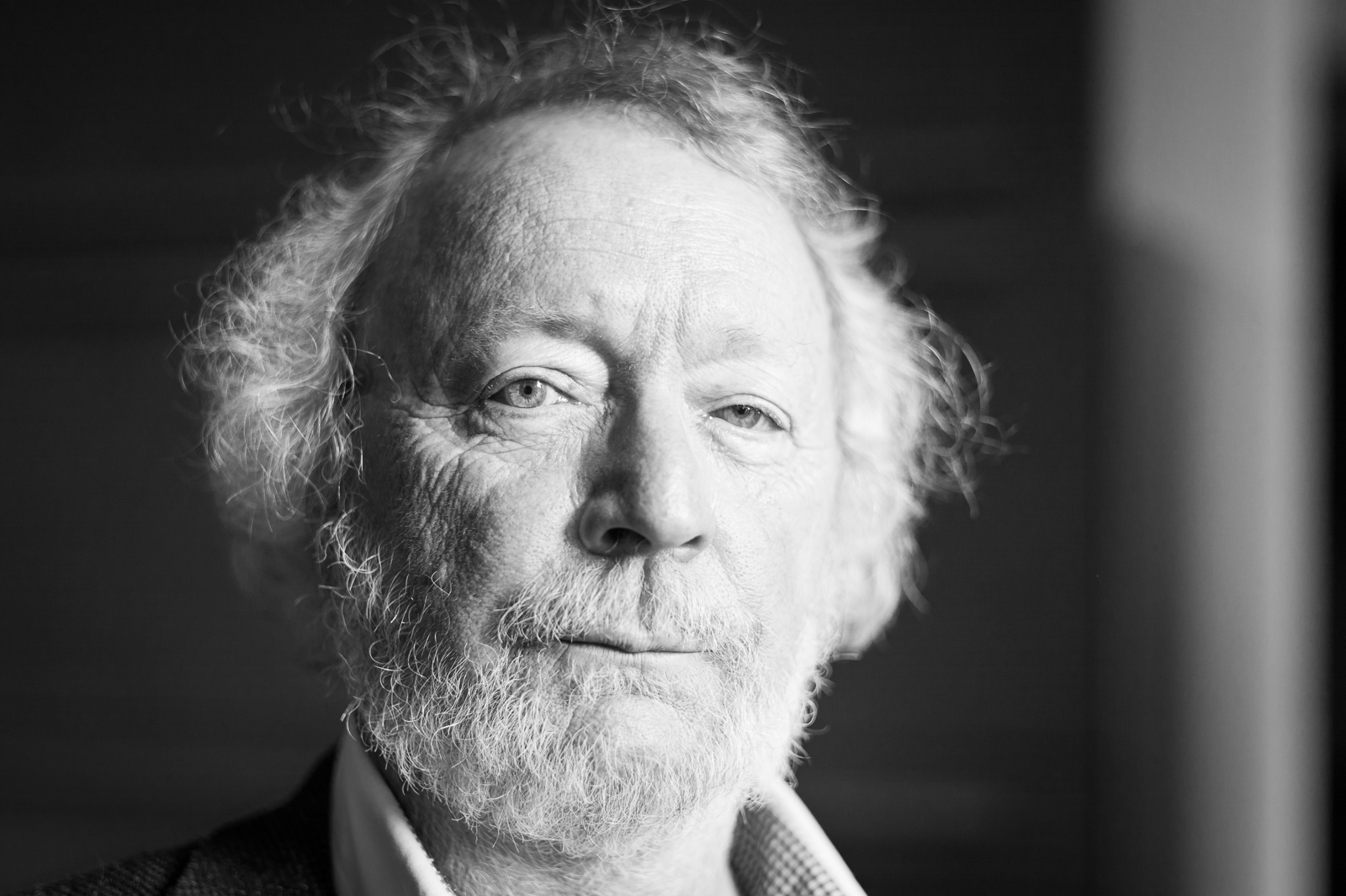
Murray G. Hall (Prague, May 2014)

Hall was an associate professor at the University of Vienna. His 1985 two-volume book on the history of Austrian publishing from 1918 to 1938 is considered authoritative. He had a great impact by co-founding and managing two learned societies: the Austrian society for book history (Gesellschaft für Buchforschung in Österreich) and the Austrian Society for Research on Children's and Youth Literature (Österreichische Gesellschaft für Kinder- und Jugendliteraturforschung). He died on 4 September 2023, at the age of 76.

== Selected publications ==
=== Monographs ===
- Der Fall Bettauer. Löcker Verlag, Wien 1978, ISBN 3-85409-002-1.
- with Franz Kadrnoska, Friedrich Kornauth, Wendelin Schmidt-Dengler: Die Muskete. Kultur- und Sozialgeschichte im Spiegel einer satirisch-humoristischen Zeitschrift, 1905-1941. Edition Tusch, Wien 1983, ISBN 3-85063-137-0.
- Österreichische Verlagsgeschichte 1918–1938. Band 1: Geschichte des österreichischen Verlagswesens. Böhlau, Wien/Köln/Graz 1985, ISBN 3-205-07258-8, Literatur und Leben. Neue Folge. 28/I
- Österreichische Verlagsgeschichte 1918–1938. Band 2: Belletristische Verlage der Ersten Republik. Böhlau, Wien/Köln/Graz 1985, ISBN 3-412-05585-9, (= Literatur und Leben. Neue Folge. 28/II
- with Gerhard Renner: Handbuch der Nachlässe und Sammlungen österreichischer Autoren (= Literatur in der Geschichte, Geschichte in der Literatur. Band 23). Böhlau, Wien/Köln/Weimar 1992, ISBN 3-205-05528-4.
- Der Paul-Zsolnay-Verlag: von der Gründung bis zur Rückkehr aus dem Exil (= Studien und Texte zur Sozialgeschichte der Literatur. Band 45). Niemeyer Verlag, Tübingen 1994, ISBN 3-484-35045-8.
- mit Herbert Ohrlinger: Der Paul Zsolnay Verlag 1924–1999. Dokumente und Zeugnisse. Paul Zsolnay Verlag, Wien 1999, ISBN 3-552-04948-7.
- (Hrsg.), Carl Junker: Zum Buchwesen in Österreich: gesammelte Schriften (1896–1927) (= Buchforschung. Band 2). Edition Praesens, Wien 2001, ISBN 3-7069-0058-0.
- (Hrsg.): Geraubte Bücher. Die Österreichische Nationalbibliothek stellt sich ihrer NS-Vergangenheit. Ausstellung vom 10. Dezember 2004 bis 23. Januar 2005. Österreichische Nationalbibliothek, Wien 2004, ISBN 3-01-000035-9.
- with Christina Köstner: „... allerlei für die Nationalbibliothek zu ergattern...“: Eine österreichische Institution in der NS-Zeit. Böhlau Verlag, Wien 2006, ISBN 978-3-205-77504-1.
- Der Volk und Reich Verlag, Prag : zur Geschichte des Buchhandels und Verlagswesens im Protektorat Böhmen und Mähren 1939-1945, Wien : Praesens Verlag, 2021, ISBN 978-3-7069-1131-3

Other publications:

- Zur Geschichte des Buchhandels in den Böhmischen Ländern im 19. und 20. Jahrhundert. In: Mitteilungen der Gesellschaft für Buchforschung in Österreich. Nr. 1, 2015, S. 7–21.
- Die Militarisierung der Jugendliteratur 1933–1945. In: Susanne Blumesberger, Jörg Thunecke (Hrsg.): Deutschsprachige Kinder- und Jugendliteratur während der Zwischenkriegszeit und im Exil. Schwerpunkt Österreich. Peter Lang Edition, Frankfurt am Main 2017, S. 99–113.
