= Erika Anderson (engineer) =

American mechanical engineer, advocate for women of color in engineering

- Born: December 15, 1989; Atlanta, Georgia
- Died: September 20, 2023 (aged 33)
- Citizenship: American
- Education: Spelman College and Georgia Instit
- Occupation: mechanical engineer
- Employer: ExxonMobil
- Spouse: Chadwick Alexander Anderson
- Parents: Jeffery Dommond (father); Elizabeth Dommond (mother)

Erika Nicole Anderson (December 15, 1989 – September 20, 2023) was an American mechanical engineer who worked as a strategist and reliability engineer at ExxonMobil She was a nationally known advocate for women of color in engineering and was recognized as an IF/THEN Ambassador for the American Association for the Advancement of Science.

== Early life and education ==
Anderson grew up in Atlanta, Georgia, and was an honors high school student who won many scholastic achievement awards. She earned bachelor's degrees in mathematics and mechanical engineering from Spelman College and Georgia Institute of Technology, respectively. Anderson was passionate about school and worked hard to build community while in college. At Spelman, she served as the academic excellence chair for her school's National Society of Black Engineers chapter. Over her college summers, Anderson interned at NASA and GE Aviation, gaining real industry experience that helped her decide what career she was most interested in.

== Career ==
In July 2022, Anderson accepted a position as a reliability engineer with Georgia-Pacific and returned to Georgia. Anderson's interest in math prompted her to pursue a career as an engineer, something she originally believed was a "train driver" during her senior year of high school. Following graduation, she obtained a job at ExxonMobil in Texas. After a few years, she returned to school to earn a master's degree in data analytics from Texas A&M University.

Continuing at ExxonMobil, she led a team of unit inspectors, process operators, and mechanical and chemical engineers in ensuring the quality and safety of refinery equipment in Beaumont, Texas. Her leadership involved ensuring the equipment was usable and effectively produced end products like gasoline, waxes, diesel, plastic, and asphalt from crude oil.

== STEM advocacy ==
Anderson discovered engineering as a career when applying to colleges. This motivated her to help expose young women of color to STEM at an early age so they could see the many possibilities open to them. Education was important to her throughout her life, and she wanted girls like her to grow up sharing her success.

Anderson was active in her local communities, helping individuals find confidence in themselves and their abilities through community outreach programs, mentorships, career days, and tutoring.

Anderson was honored with selection to the AAAS IF/THEN Ambassadors Program, which allowed her to serve as a high-profile role model for girls. Her likeness was among 124 others 3D printed into a life-sized orange statue that traveled the country to inspire and encourage women in the STEM fields.

She was selected in 2019 as one of 125 AAAS IF/THEN® Ambassadors, a cohort of women STEM leaders chosen to serve as high-profile role models. Her likeness was included in “#IfThenSheCan – The Exhibit,” a display of 120 life-size 3D-printed statues of contemporary women in STEM shown on the National Mall during Women’s Futures Month in March 2022.

== Personal life ==
Erika Anderson was the daughter of Jeffery and Elizabeth Dommond and sister of Pamela Danielle Dommond. She was married to Chadwick Alexander Anderson, who died shortly after their marriage. Despite his death, she persevered through her career at ExxonMobil and continued her mission of inspiring young women of color to pursue careers in the STEM field. She said: "When passion meets purpose, the opportunities are endless."

Anderson was an avid rapper/songwriter who enjoyed sharing the art with those in her community.

Anderson died in September 2023.
