= Ced Gyles =

Canadian football player

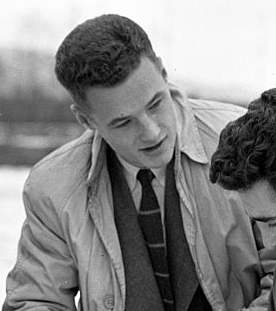
- Ced Gyles in 1948

Profile
- Position: Halfback

Personal information
- Born: December 23, 1926; Vancouver, British Columbia, Canada
- Died: September 24, 2023 (aged 96); The Blue Mountains, Ontario, Canada
- Listed height: 6 ft 0 in (1.83 m)
- Listed weight: 180 lb (82 kg)

Career history
- 1948–1951: Calgary Stampeders

Awards and highlights
- Grey Cup champion (1948)

Cedric George Edward Gyles (December 23, 1926 – September 24, 2023) was a Canadian professional football player who played for the Calgary Stampeders. He won the Grey Cup with them in 1948. Gyles played junior football in Vancouver, British Columbia with the Junior Vancouver Blue Bombers. From 1968 to 1969, Gyles was president of the Winnipeg Blue Bombers. An avid sailor, he was a long time member of the Royal Canadian Yacht Club in Toronto, Ontario. He served as Club Commodore in 1985-86. Gyles skippered the yacht Norseman to the Sira Cup at the 1999 8-Metre World Cup in Rochester, New York Gyles died on September 30, 2023 at the age of 96. Gyles resided in Collingwood, Ontario and was one of the last surviving members of the 1948 Grey Cup championship team.
