= Djovi Gally =

Togolese lawyer and politician (1955–2023)

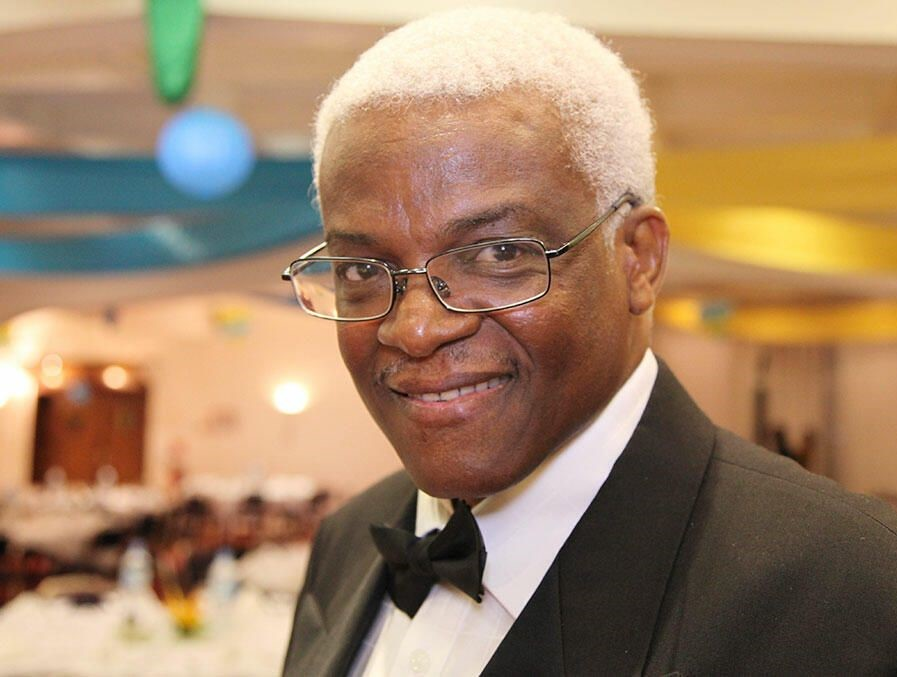

Minister of Human Rights
- In office 1991–1992

Minister of Human Rights and Rehabilitation
- In office 1994–1995

Personal details
- Born: 6 October 1955 Aného, French Togoland, French West Africa
- Died: 27 September 2023 (aged 67)
- Party: UFC
- Education: Paris 1 Panthéon-Sorbonne University; University of Strasbourg
- Occupation: Lawyer

Djovi Gally (6 October 1955 – 27 September 2023) was a Togolese lawyer and politician of the Union of Forces for Change (UFC). He is particularly known for his efforts in advocating for human rights.

== Biography ==
Born in Aného on 6 October 1955, Gally began learning the French language and its literature as a child. In 1981, he earned a law degree from Paris 1 Panthéon-Sorbonne University, a master's in private law from the same school in 1982, a bachelor of philosophy in 1983, a Master of Advanced Studies in comparative law in 1983, and a master's degree in political science in 1983. He earned a degree in canon law from the Faculty of Catholic Theology of the University of Strasbourg in 1984.

Gally joined the Lomé Bar Association in 1984, practicing business law, civil law, labor law, criminal law, and environmental law. He also served in politics, having held the roles of Minister of Human Rights from 1991 to 1992 and Minister of Human Rights and Rehabilitation from 1994 to 1995. He also represented Togo on the Permanent Council of La Francophonie from 1992 to 1993.

Gally died on 27 September 2023, at the age of 67.

== Distinctions ==
- Knight of the Legion of Honour (1999)
- Officer of the Legion of Honour (2015)
