= Ginger Mayson =

American college volleyball coach (1954/1955 – 2023)

Ginger Mayson (1954/1955 – September 7, 2023) was an American college volleyball coach. She started her coaching career at the University of South Alabama. Mayson became an assistant coach for Kansas State for the 1985 season, then started an eight-year career as the head coach of the Michigan State Spartans volleyball team.

== Early life ==
Ginger Mayson graduated from the University of South Alabama in 1977 with a Bachelor's of Arts degree in criminal justice/administration. Mayson was a four time letter winner in volleyball and a three time letter winner in basketball. She also received all-conference honors twice. Mayson received a master's degree in public administration of South Alabama.

== Coaching career ==
=== South Alabama ===
Mayson coached South Alabama for two years, accruing a record of 56–26. In 1982, she coached the team to a 42–13 record, at the time a program record. She coached at South Alabama from 1981 to 1983.

=== Kansas State ===
Mayson was an assistant coach for the volleyball team for the 1984 season.

=== Michigan State ===
Ginger Mayson began coaching the Michigan State volleyball team in 1985. Mayson coached for eight years and finished her career with a record of 67–181. She finished with a Big Ten Conference record of 22–126.

Mayson coached for an underfunded program that performed poorly. Later in her coaching career, after coaching matches she would go home and cry about the hopelessness of the situation. She retired from the program in 1992, and ended her coaching career, but still kept a strong interest in volleyball. About coaching in the future, she said "I have no interest in coaching again. None. I haven't regretted giving it up for one second. Not one second."

== Death ==
Ginger Mayson died on September 7, 2023, at the age of 68.

== Head coaching record ==
Statistics overview
Season	Team	Overall	Conference	Standing	Postseason
South Alabama () (1981–1982)
1981	South Alabama	14-1-2	-		
1982	South Alabama	42-13	-		
South Alabama:		56-26-2 (.679)			
Michigan State (Big Ten Conference) (1985–1990)
1985	Michigan State	7-25	0-18	10th	
1986	Michigan State	14-21	6-12	7th	
1987	Michigan State	3-26	0-18	10th	
1988	Michigan State	9-18	5-13	9th	
1989	Michigan State	14-17	4-14	9th	
1990	Michigan State	9-25	4-14	8th	
1991	Michigan State	3-27	1-19	11th	
1992	Michigan State	8-22	2-18	11th	
Michigan State:		67-18 (.453)	22-126		
Total:		-			
National champion Postseason invitational champion Conference regular season champion Conference regular season and conference tournament champion Division regular season champion Division regular season and conference tournament champion Conference tournament champion
