= Stephen Erickson =

American philosopher (1939/1940 – 2023)

Stephen A. Erickson
- Born: 1939/1940
- Died: September 20, 2023 (aged 83)

Philosophical work
- Era: 21st century Philosophy
- Region: Western Philosophy
- School: Continental
- Main interests: Philosophy; Postmodernism
- Notable ideas: The (Coming) Age of Thresholding

Stephen A. Erickson (1939/1940 – September 20, 2023) was an American philosopher. He was a professor of philosophy at Pomona College in Claremont, California, where he held the E. Wilson Lyon Professor of the Humanities and Professor of Philosophy titles. He was known for his lectures in The Great Courses titled "Philosophy as a Guide to Living". He received his Ph.D. in Philosophy from Yale University. Erickson died of Parkinson's disease on September 20, 2023, at the age of 83.

== Bibliography ==
- Language and Being: An Analytic Phenomenology, 1970
- The (Coming) Age of Thresholding, 1999
- Human Presence & Boundaries, Mercer University Press, 1984
- Philosophy as a Guide to Living, two parts, 2006
