= Bernard de Marcken de Mercken =

Belgian baron and politician (1934–2023)

Member of the Parliament of the Brussels-Capital Region
- In office 12 July 1989 – 7 June 1995

Personal details
- Born: 1 November 1934
- Died: 5 September 2023 (aged 88)
- Party: PSC
- Occupation: Baron

Bernard de Marcken de Mercken (1 November 1934 – 5 September 2023) was a Belgian baron and politician. A member of the Christian Social Party, he served in the Parliament of the Brussels-Capital Region from 1989 to 1995.

De Marcken de Mercken died on 5 September 2023, at the age of 88.
