= Manfred Pointner =

German politician (1943–2023)

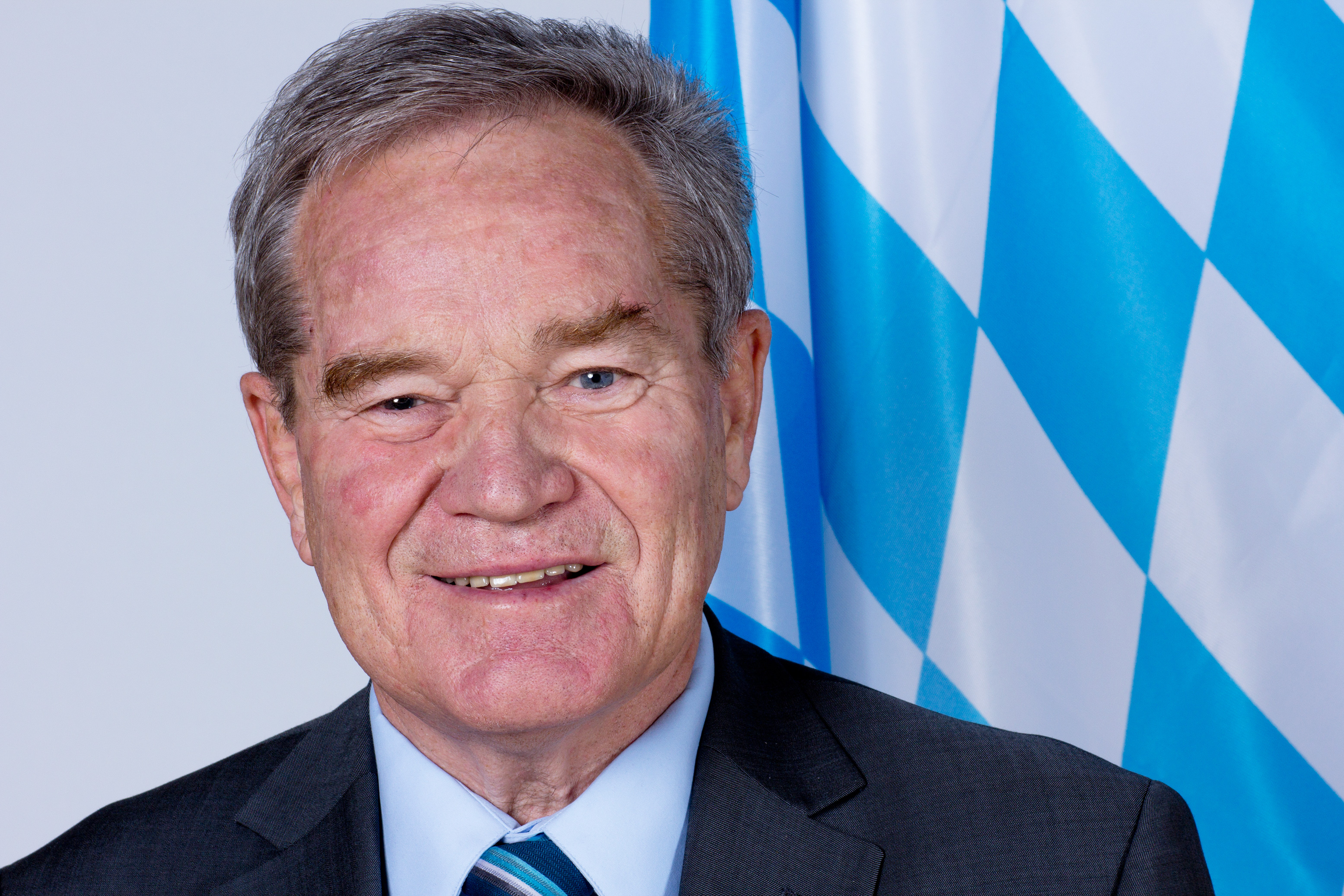
- Pointner in 2012

Member of the Landtag of Bavaria
- In office 20 October 2008 – 7 October 2013
- Constituency: Stimmkreis Freising

Personal details
- Born: 5 February 1943 Oberding, Germany
- Died: 26 September 2023 (aged 80) Erding, Bavaria, Germany
- Party: FW
- Occupation: Lawyer

Manfred Pointner (5 February 1943 – 26 September 2023) was a German lawyer and politician. A member of the Free Voters of Bavaria, he served in the Landtag of Bavaria from 2008 to 2013.

Pointner died in Erding on 26 September 2023, at the age of 80.
