= Karl Wöllert =

Austrian politician (1942–2023)

Member of the Federal Council of Austria
- In office 12 December 1990 – 2 November 1997

Personal details
- Born: 3 January 1942 Lundenburg, Reichsgau Niederdonau, Germany
- Died: 1 September 2023 (aged 81)
- Party: SPÖ

Karl Wöllert (3 January 1942 – 1 September 2023) was an Austrian politician. A member of the Social Democratic Party, representing Linz and Upper Austria, he served in the Federal Council from 1990 to 1997.

Wöllert died on 1 September 2023, at the age of 81.
