= Aníbal de Peña =

Dominican singer (1933–2023)

Aníbal de Peña (11 May 1933 – 17 September 2023) was a Dominican singer, pianist, and composer. He died on 17 September 2023, at the age of 90.
