= László Kutas =

Hungarian sculptor (1936–2023)

- Born: 17 April 1936; Budapest, Hungary
- Died: 12 September 2023 (aged 87)
- Known for: Sculpture

László Kutas (17 April 1936 – 12 September 2023) was a Hungarian leading figure of contemporary sculptural art. His figurative sculptures, commemorative coins and medals, major public and private statues can be found in museums, private collections and public squares including Windsor Palace in London, the International Coin Corporation in New York, the Royal Collection of Medals in Stockholm, Sweden, the National Gallery in Budapest, Hungary, the City Collection in Florence, Italy and the Centro Dantesco in Ravenna, Italy. Kutas was also an international jury member of the "Dante Small Sculpture Biennale" in Ravenna, Italy.

== Background ==
Kutas was born in Budapest, Hungary in 1936. He attended the Gymnasium of the Hungarian Reformed Church in Budapest, the Free School of Ernő Ágoston, and the Dániel Berzsenyi Gimnázium, Sopron. He died on 12 September 2023, at the age of 87.

== Prizes ==
- 1974 | 1st Prize "Giorgio Vasari" Florence International Medal Competition (Italy)
- 1976 | Special Prize "Silver spear" competition
- 1979 | Silver Medal Dante Biennale, Ravenna (Italy)
- 1983 | Prize "Karl Marx competition," Budapest (Hungary)
- 1983 | International jury membership of the "Dante Small Sculpture Biennale" in Ravenna (Italy)
- 1991, 1995 | Vilmos Rosz Prize, Sopron (Hungary)
- 1994 | Prize Bernath Venlo (the Netherlands)
- 2003 | “Pro Cultura Sopron” award, Sopron (Hungary)

COMMEMORATIVE COINS

1981 | Bartók 500 Forint’s silver coin

1984 | Kőrösi Csoma Sándor 100 Forint’s alpaca coin

1986 | Mexico Football World Cup 500 Forint’s silver coin

1987 | Seoul Olympic Games 500 Forint’s silver coin

1988 | Football World Cup 500 Forint’s silver 100 Forint’s alpaca coin

1989 | Football World Cup 500 Forint’s silver coin 100 Forint’s alpaca coin

1990 | 200 years of professional Hungarian Theatre 100 Forint’s alpaca coin

1990 | Mathias Rex 5000 Forint’s gold coin

1991 | Széchenyi István 500 Forint’s silver coin

1993 | Erkel Ferenc 10.000 Forint’s gold coin

1995 | Atlanta Olympic Games 1000 Forint’s silver coin

INDIVIDUAL EXHIBITIONS [selection]

1971 | Madách Theatre, Budapest (Hungary)

1975 | Wiener Neustadt Galerie 9 (Austria)

1976 | Sopron, Fertőd (Hungary)

1980, 1983 and 1985 | The BFG Gallery, Regensburg (Germany)

1983 | Paks, Fertőd (Hungary)

1984 | The Dürer Hall in Budapest (Hungary)

1984 | Törökszentmiklós, Hajdúdorog, Budapest, Miskolc (Hungary)

1985 | Eger, Békéscsaba, Szeged, Budapest (Hungary)

1986 | The Kodansha Gallery, Tokyo (Japan)

1987 | The Mensch Gallery of Hamburg (Germany)

1987 | Yokohama (Japan); Budapest (Hungary); Hamburg (Germany); Mayrhofen, Wels (Austria); Amsterdam (the Netherlands)

1989 | The Raum und Kunst Gallery of Hamburg, Germany;

1990 | The Gallery of Carmen de Pelichi in Brussels (Belgium)

1990 | Düsseldorf (Germany)

1991 | Hungarian Cultural Centre Warsaw (Poland)

1991 | Sopron (Hungary)

1992 | Dunakeszi (Hungary)

1993 | The Gallery of the Grevenbroich Hospital, Hamburg (Germany)

1994 | “The Exhibition of Vengeance” at the Gallery OSZK in the Palace of Buda

1994 | Exhibition at the Kunsthandel P. Breughel in Amsterdam (The Netherlands)

1995 | Kreissparkasse Gallery in Northeim (Germany)

1996 | The Venlo Pieter Breughel Gallery (The Netherlands)

1997 | Exhibition in the Hall of Painters in Sopron (Hungary)

1997 | Kutas Art Gallery, Budapest (Hungary)

1999 | The Diana Gallery in Helsinki (Finland)

2000 | Petőfi Museum Kiskőrös (Hungary)

2001 | Cultural Home of the Domestic Guard Veszprém (Hungary)

2002 | Exhibition at the John Calvin House of the City of Eger in Hungary

2003 | City Library of Vác and the Aladár Mühl Exhibition Hall of Sopron (Hungary)

COLLECTIVE EXHIBITIONS

Since 1961: Budapest, Pécs, Sopron, Szeged, Moscow, Florence, Ravenna, Lisbon, Amsterdam, Phenjan, Padova, Stockholm, London, Newcastle, Colorado Springs, Prague, Copenhagen, New York.

From 1977 onward, biannual FIDEM exhibitions (Lisbon, Florence, Helsinki, Colorado Springs, London, etc.)

From 1964 annually at the Autumn Art Shows in Hódmezővásárhely (Hungary)

1977 – onward: repeatedly at the biannual medal shows of Sopron, and the Exhibitions of the Guild of Artists of the City of Sopron (Hungary)

1990 Exhibition of the Students of Ernő Ágoston, Electrotechnical High School of the City of Sopron

WORKS IN PRIVATE- AND PUBLIC COLLECTIONS OF THE FIVE CONTINENTS

Hungarian National Gallery, Budapest (Hungary)

Tornyai Museum, Hódmezővásárhely (Hungary)

Déri Museum, Debrecen (Hungary)

Liszt Ferenc Museum, Sopron (Hungary)

Collection Municipal, Wiener-Neustadt (Austria)

Royal Coin Collection, Stockholm (Sweden)

“Centre Dantesco”, Ravenna (Italy)

“Comune di Firenze”, Florence (Italy)

Kunsthistorisches Museum, Vienna (Austria)

States Coins Collection, Munich (Germany)

I.C.C. (International Coin Corporation), New York (USA)

Yukio Manabe, Kyoto (Japan)

Peter Koliner, Sydney (Australia)

Dr. Bernard, Capetown (South Africa)

Nathan Engelmarin, Bogota (Colombia)

Theo Schaapveld, Middelbeers (The Netherlands)

Lady Diana and Prince Charles, Windsor Palace, London (UK)

WORKS IN PUBLIC SQUARES

Hungary | Komló, Törökszentmiklós, Baja, Debrecen, Paks, Zánka, Budapest, Hévíz, Sopron, Fehérgyarmat, Pécs, Csurgó, Eger, Kiskőrös

Romania | Illyefalva

Austria | Lindabrunn

Slovakia | Wisne Ruzbachy

== Sources ==
- Hegyeshalmi, László, Emil Zsolt Gádor & Mihály Praznovszky, eds. Kutas: A selection from the comprehensive works of sculptor László Kutas made up of small statues, major statues exhibited on public squares, medals and coins, trans. Ádám Makkai, Poppins Bt. and the Kutas Galleries in Szentendre and Sopron, 2004.
