= Mubarak Qazi =

Balochi poet (1956–2023)

- مبارک کازی
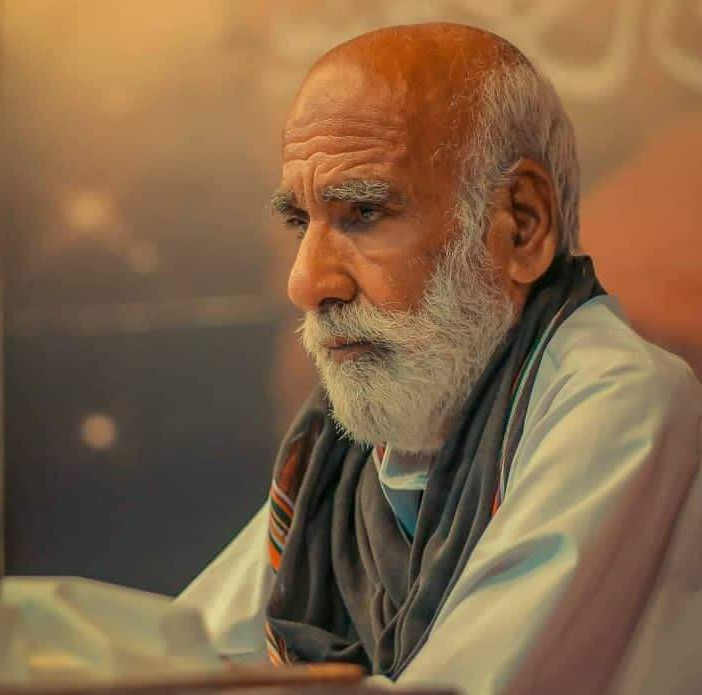
- Photograph of Qazi
- Born: 24 December 1956; Passeni, Balochistan
- Died: 16 September 2023 (aged 66); Turbat, Balochistan.
- Education: M.A. (IR)
- Occupation: Poet
- Known for: Poetry
- Title: Shayr-e-Ashob ("revolutionary poet")
- Children: Kambar Mubarak †
- Relatives: Kawda Amanollah (father)

Mubarak Qazi (Note: Balochi: مبارک کازی, Urdu: مبارک قاضی) was a Baloch poet who wrote in Balochi language and gained recognition for his modernist and revolutionary style. Renowned for his evocative poetry that blended themes of love and politics, Qazi emerged as a powerful literary figure in Balochistan's cultural landscape.

== Biography ==
Born on 24 October 1956 in the coastal town of Passeni in Balochistan, Qazi was the son of Kawda Amanollah. Qazi received his early education in his hometown of Pasni, completing his matriculation in 1972 before pursuing higher studies in Karachi, where he graduated from Sindh Muslim Arts College. He later earned a master's degree in international relations from the University of Balochistan (UoB).

Over the course of his career, he published multiple collections of poetry. Qazi's poetry frequently challenged established norms and critiqued Pakistani-state policies, which led to his imprisonment in 2007. He was detained for eight months in jail in Turbat, underscoring the political sensitivity of his work and its perceived threat to authority.

In 2014, his son, Kambar Mubarak, reportedly affiliated with a radical separatist group, was killed in an armed confrontation within Kech District. Qazi remained a respected and influential figure in Balochi literature until his death on 16 September 2023.

== Works ==
- Zarnawisht (1990)
- Shag Man Sabzen Sawada (2003)
- Mani Ahday Gamay Kessah (2010)
- Hani Mani Maten Watan (2012)
- Cholan Darya Yal Datag (2012)
- Morg Pa Kodohan Raptag Anth (2014)
- Jungal Chencho Zeba Enth (2016)
- Aap Sammka Jatag (2019)
- Shakkalén Jawráni Barward (2022)
- Gesa Watar Kanag Lotan (2022)
- Chirag Tahna Inth (2024)
- Kobl Darwazag Inth (2024)
- Shahkour Wahde Har Kanth (2025)
