= Olav Boksasp =

Norwegian sports official (1958–2023)

Olav Boksasp (12 February 1958 – 9 September 2023) was a Norwegian sports official.

Boksasp was the director of sports in Molde FK from the mid-1990s. From 2002 to 2006 he was the chairman of Norsk Toppfotball. In 2009 he was rumored to become a candidate for president of the Football Association of Norway, but this did not go through. Boksasp died on 9 September 2023, at the age of 65.
