= Hisae Mitsuishi =

Japanese politician (1927–2023)

Member of the House of Councillors
- In office 23 July 1989 – 23 July 1995

Personal details
- Born: 21 September 1927 Karafuto, Japan
- Died: 26 September 2023 (aged 96) Makinohara, Japan
- Party: JSP; Liberals for Protecting the Constitution

Hisae Mitsuishi (Japanese: 三石久江 Mistuishi Hisae; 21 September 1927 – 26 September 2023) was a Japanese politician. A member of the Japan Socialist Party and later the Liberals for Protecting the Constitution, she served in the House of Councillors from 1989 to 1995.

Mitsuishi died in Makinohara on 26 September 2023, at the age of 96.
