= Jean Allouch =

French psychologist and psychoanalyist (1939–2023)

- Born: 6 April 1939; Montpellier, France
- Died: 16 September 2023 (aged 84)
- Education: École Freudienne de Paris
- Occupations: Psychologist; Psychoanalyst

Jean Allouch (6 April 1939 – 16 September 2023) was a French psychologist and psychoanalyst.

== Biography ==
Born in Montpellier on 6 April 1939, Allouch studied psychology and philosophy and attended seminars by Jacques Lacan. After the dissolution of the École Freudienne de Paris, of which he was a member, he began making contributions to the magazine Littoral and participated in the foundation of the École lacanienne de psychanalyse in 1985. He also created the collection "Les grands classiques de l’érotologie moderne" for Éditions Epel. His seminar, held at the Sainte-Anne Hospital Center, expanded abroad, particularly in Latin America.

Jean Allouch died on 16 September 2023, at the age of 84.

== Publications ==
- La « solution » du passage à l’acte (1984)
- Lettre pour lettre. Transcrire, traduire, translittérer (1984)
- Louis Althusser récit divan (1992)
- Freud, et puis Lacan (1993)
- Marguerite, ou l'Aimée de Lacan (1994)
- Érotique du deuil au temps de la mort sèche (1995)
- Éthification de la psychanalyse. Calamité (1996)
- Le sexe de la vérité (1998)
- Allo Lacan ? Certainement pas ! (1998)
- La psychanalyse, une érotologie de passage (1998)
- Le sexe du maître (2001)
- Ça de Kant, cas de Sade (2001)
- Les Années Lacan (2003)
- Ombre de ton chien. Discours psychanalytique, discours lesbien (2004)
- La psychanalyse est-elle un exercice spirituel ? Réponse à Michel Foucault (2004)
- Oser construire : Pour François Jullien (2007)
- Lacan Love. Melbourne seminars and others works (2007)
- Pensées pour le nouveau siècle (2008)
- 543 impromptus de Jacques Lacan (2009)
- Contre l’éternité. Ogawa, Mallarmé, Lacan (2009)
- L’Amour Lacan (2009)
- Prisonniers du Grand Autre. L'Ingérence divine I (2012)
- Schreber théologien. L'Ingérence divine II (2013)
- Une femme sans au-delà. L'ingérence divine III (2014)
- L'Autresexe (2015)
- Pourquoi y a-t-il de l'excitation sexuelle plutôt que rien ? (2017)
- La Scène lacanienne et son cercle magique (2017)
- Nouvelles remarques sur le passage à l’acte (2019)
- La leçon d'Artaud: Une esthétique de l'esprit (2023)
