= Makoto Katamine =

Japanese politician (1956–2023)

Makoto Katamine (March 30, 1956 – September 25, 2023) was a Japanese politician and educator. He served two terms as mayor of Iizuka, Fukuoka Prefecture.

== Biography ==
Makoto Katamine was born in Iizuka City on March 30, 1956. He graduated from the Department of Pharmacy of Daiichi Pharmaceutical University. In April 1982, he became a teacher at Iizuka Daiichi Junior High School, by April 1991, he became a teacher at Chinzei Junior High School. In April 2004, he became the principal of Honami Nishi Junior High School (currently Iizuka City Honami Nishi Junior High School). In May 2010, he was appointed the superintendent of the Iizuka City Board of Education.

On January 11, 2017, Mayor Morifumi Saito and Vice Mayor Hidetoshi Tanaka of Iizuka City, who were found to be playing mahjong during the opening hours of the city on weekdays, held a press conference, and on January 31, he announced that he would resign. In response to this, on January 20 of the same year, he announced his candidacy for the mayoral election following his resignation. At this time, Katamine revealed at a press conference that he had played mahjong with Mayor Saito and Deputy Mayor Tanaka, and emphasized that he would "never do it again.''

Katamine ran for mayor in the mayoral election held on February 26 of the same year, receiving endorsements from the Liberal Democratic Party, Democratic Party, and New Komeito Party, and was elected for the first time, defeating two candidates, including former city councillor Toshiyuki Obata.

Katamine died on September 25, 2023, at the age of 67.
