= Bill R. Fuller =

American politician (1938–2023)

Member of the Kansas House of Representatives
- In office 1979–1984

Personal details
- Born: April 9, 1938 Ottawa County, Kansas, U.S.
- Died: September 2, 2023 (aged 85) Riley County, Kansas, U.S.
- Party: Republican
- Education: Kansas State University

Bill R. Fuller (April 9, 1938 – September 2, 2023) was an American politician. He served as a Republican member of the Kansas House of Representatives.

== Life and career ==
Bill R. Fuller was born in Ottawa County, Kansas on April 9, 1938. He attended Miltonvale Rural High School and Kansas State University.

Fuller was a Miltonvale farmer.

Fuller served in the Kansas House of Representatives from 1979 to 1984.

Bill R. Fuller died in Riley County, Kansas on September 2, 2023, at the age of 85.
