= Helmut Halupka =

German politician (1948–2023)

Member of the Landtag of Saxony-Anhalt
- In office 1998–2002

Personal details
- Born: 3 October 1948 Jerichow, Saxony-Anhalt, Germany
- Died: 4 September 2023 (aged 74)
- Party: SPD
- Occupation: Engineer

Helmut Halupka (3 October 1948 – 4 September 2023) was a German engineer and politician. A member of the Social Democratic Party, he served in the Landtag of Saxony-Anhalt from 1998 to 2002.

Halupka died on 4 September 2023, at the age of 74.
