= Uwe Wesel =

German academic, lawyer, and legal historian (1933–2023)

- Born: 2 February 1933; Hamburg, Germany
- Died: 11 September 2023 (aged 90); Berlin, Germany
- Education: LMU Munich; Saarland University
- Occupations: Professor; Lawyer; Legal historian
- Political party: SPD (1959–1974, 2008–2023)

Uwe Wesel (2 February 1933 – 11 September 2023) was a German academic, lawyer, and legal historian. He taught at the Free University of Berlin (FU).

== Biography ==
Born in Hamburg on 2 February 1933, Wesel joined the Social Democratic Party of Germany (SPD) in 1959, where he was a member until his expulsion in 1974. He had allegedly given "tactical advice" to students of the Kommunistischer Studentenverband (KSV) during a lecture at FU, who had been rioting. The lecture was published in the Berliner Extra-Dienst. He defended himself, stating that with his lecture, the KSV recognized the senselessness of its attacks and harassment against the FU professors and the riots ended the next day. He was allowed to rejoin the SPD on 1 September 2008.

In 2013, on the 250th anniversary of the foundation of the C. H. Beck, Wesel wrote a history of the publishing house. His portrayal of Heinrich Beck's leadership during Nazi Germany was met with some opposition. He described the appointment of Carl Schmitt as editor-in-chief of the Deutsche Juristen-Zeitung, Heinrich Beck's membership in the Nazi Party, and the publication of legal commentaries on Nazi law as being due to "circumstances of the time". In 2021, he published his autobiography, titled Wozu Latein, wenn man gesund ist? Ein Bildungsbericht. After his retirement, he worked as a lawyer.

Uwe Wesel died in Berlin on 11 September 2023, at the age of 90.

== Publications ==
- Die Hausarbeit in der Digestenexegese. Eine Einführung für Studenten und Doktoranden (1966)
- Rhetorische Statuslehre und Gesetzesauslegung der römischen Juristen (1967)
- Der Mythos vom Matriarchat: Über Bachofens Mutterrecht und die Stellung von Frauen in frühen Gesellschaften vor der Entstehung staatlicher Herrschaft (1980)
- Aufklärungen über Recht: Zehn Beiträge zur Entmythologisierung (1981)
- Juristische Weltkunde: eine Einführung in das Recht (1984)
- Frühformen des Rechts in vorstaatlichen Gesellschaften: Umrisse einer Frühgeschichte des Rechts bei Sammlern und Jägern und akephalen Ackerbauern und Hirten (1985)
- Recht und Gewalt: 13 Eingriffe (1989)
- Fast alles, was Recht ist: Jura für Nichtjuristen (1992)
- Der Honecker-Prozeß: ein Staat vor Gericht (1994)
- Die Hüter der Verfassung: Das Bundesverfassungsgericht, seine Geschichte, seine Leistungen und seine Krisen (1996)
- Geschichte des Rechts: Von den Frühformen bis zur Gegenwart (2001)
- Risiko Rechtsanwalt (2001)
- Die verspielte Revolution: 1968 und die Folgen (2002)
- Recht, Unrecht und Gerechtigkeit: Von der Weimarer Republik bis heute (2003)
- Der Gang nach Karlsruhe: Das Bundesverfassungsgericht in der Geschichte der Bundesrepublik (2004)
- Geschichte des Rechts in Europa: Von den Griechen bis zum Vertrag von Lissabon (2010)
- 250 Jahre rechtswissenschaftlicher Verlag C. H. Beck. 1763 – 2013 (2013)
- Rechtsgeschichte der Bundesrepublik Deutschland : von der Besatzungszeit bis zur Gegenwart (2019)
- Wozu Latein, wenn man gesund ist? Ein Bildungsbericht (2021)
