= List of ambassadors of Israel to Jordan =

== List of ambassadors ==
- Amir Weissbrod 2018–2023
- Einat Shlain 2015–2017
- Daniel Nevo 2009–2015
- Jacob Rosen 2006–2009
- Yacov Hadas-Handelsman 2003–2006
- David Dadonn 2000–2003
- Oded Eran 1997–2000
- Rogel Rachman 2023–present
