= Petur-Emil Mitev =

Bulgarian politician (1936–2023)

Member of the Grand National Assembly of Bulgaria
- In office 10 July 1990 – 2 October 1991

Personal details
- Born: 21 April 1936 Sofia, Bulgaria
- Died: 12 September 2023 (aged 87) Sofia, Bulgaria
- Party: BSP
- Education: Sofia University
- Occupation: Sociologist

Petur-Emil Mitev (Bulgarian: Петър-Емил Митев; 21 April 1936 – 12 September 2023) was a Bulgarian sociologist and politician. A member of the Bulgarian Socialist Party, he served in the Grand National Assembly from 1990 to 1991.

Mitev died in Sofia on 12 September 2023, at the age of 87.
