= James E. Kieffer =

American politician (1943–2023)

Member of the North Dakota House of Representatives
- In office 1971–1972

Personal details
- Born: January 22, 1943
- Died: September 13, 2023 (aged 80)
- Party: Democratic

James E. Kieffer (January 22, 1943 – September 13, 2023) was an American politician. He served as a Democratic member of the North Dakota House of Representatives.

== Life and career ==
Kieffer was a farmer. He served in the North Dakota House of Representatives from 1971 to 1972.

James E. Kieffer died on September 13, 2023, at the age of 80.
