= Laurence Gavron =

French-Senegalese film director, writer, and photographer (1955–2023)

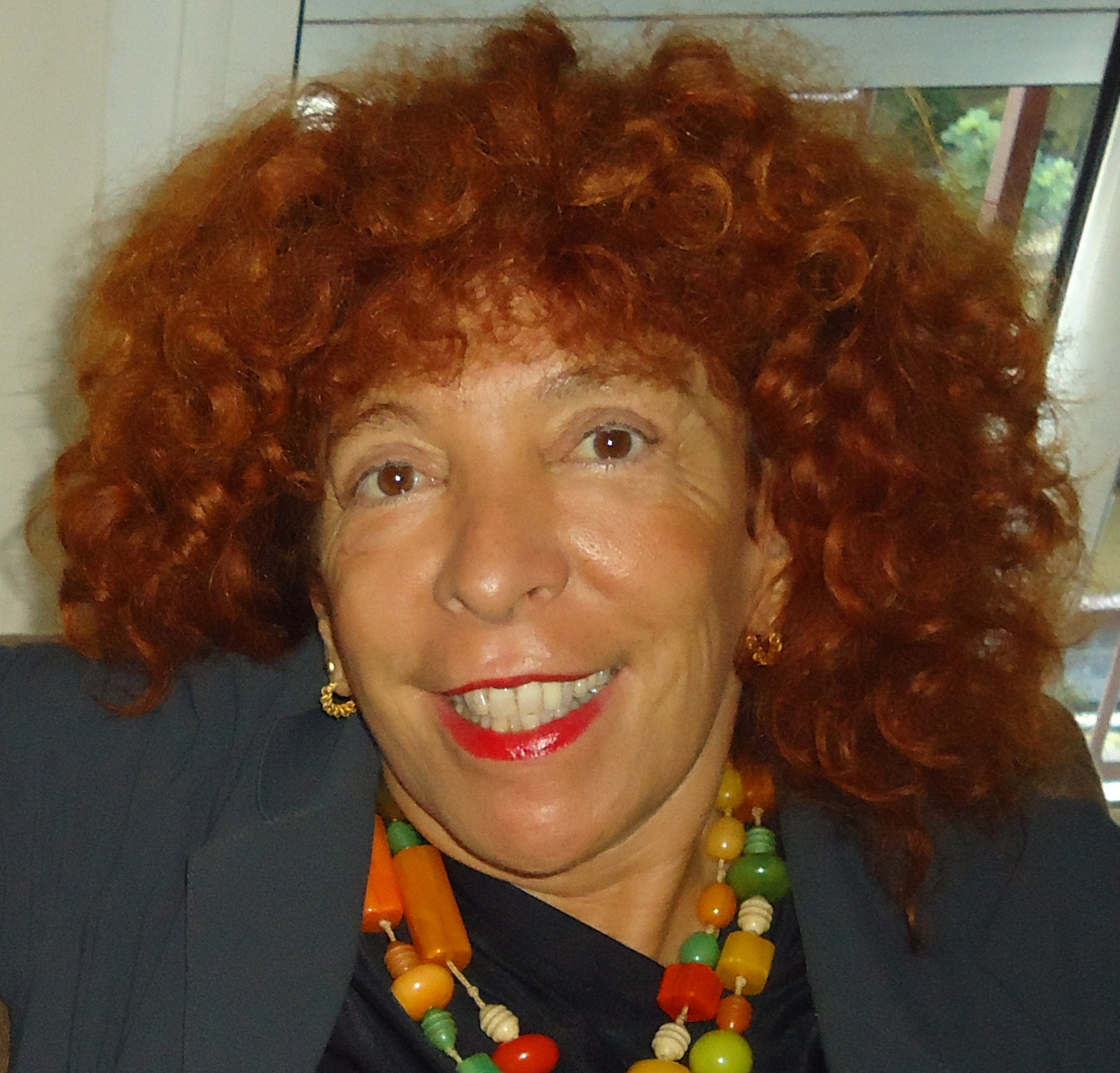
- Gavron in 2010
- Born: 1955; Paris, France
- Died: 14 September 2023 (aged 67–68); Paris, France
- Education: Sorbonne Nouvelle University Paris 3
- Occupations: Film director Writer; Photographer

Laurence Gavron (1955 – 14 September 2023) was a French-Senegalese film director, writer, and photographer.

== Biography ==
Born in Paris in 1955, Gavron completed a master's thesis in modern literature and cinema at Sorbonne Nouvelle University Paris 3 titled Aspects du thème de l'errance dans le cinéma américain. She started her career writing about cinema in various newspapers and magazines, then worked as a television journalist. She was also a journalist for Cinéma, Cinémas, Étoiles et Toiles, Métropolis, Absolument Cinéma, Après la sortie, and more.

Gavron worked alongside Denis Lenoir to write a biography of John Cassavetes, titled Marabouts d'ficelle. She also wrote the novels Boy Dakar, Hivernage, and Fouta Street, which won the Prix du roman d'aventures. Additionally, she wrote numerous articles and film critiques in various newspapers and magazines, such as Positif, Cahiers du Cinéma, Libération, and Le Monde. She moved to Dakar in 2002 and acquired Senegalese citizenship in 2008.

Laurence Gavron died in Paris on 14 September 2023.

== Works ==
=== Novels ===
- Marabouts d'ficelle (2000)
- Boy Dakar (2008)
- Hivernage (2009)
- Fouta Street (2017)

=== Documentaries ===
- Just like Eddie (1980)
- Ninki Nanka, le Prince de Colobane (1991)
- Y'a pas de problème ! : fragments de cinémas africains (1995)
- Naar bi, loin du Liban (1999)
- Sur les traces des mangeurs de coquillages (2000)
- Le Maître de la parole - El Hadj Ndiaga Mbaye, la mémoire du Sénégal (2004)
- Saudade à Dakar (2005)
- Samba Diabaré Samb, le gardien du temple (2006)
- Yandé Codou Sène, Diva Séeréer (2008)
- Assiko! (2008)
- Juifs Noirs, les racines de l'olivier (2015)
- Si loin du Vietnam (2016)
- Le Père du marié (2022)

=== Fiction films ===
- Fin de soirée (1981)
- Il maestro (1986)
- Hivernage (2020)
