= Rudolf Wickel =

German politician (1933–2023)

Member of the Landtag of North Rhine-Westphalia
- In office 30 May 1985 – 31 May 1995

Personal details
- Born: 20 March 1933 Bonn, Rhine Province, Prussia, Germany
- Died: 17 September 2023 (aged 90)
- Party: FDP
- Occupation: Engineer

Rudolf Wickel (20 March 1933 – 17 September 2023) was a German engineer and politician. A member of the Free Democratic Party, he served in the Landtag of North Rhine-Westphalia from 1985 to 1995.

Wickel died on 17 September 2023, at the age of 90.
