= Liudvikas Narcizas Rasimavičius =

Lithuanian politician (1938–2023)

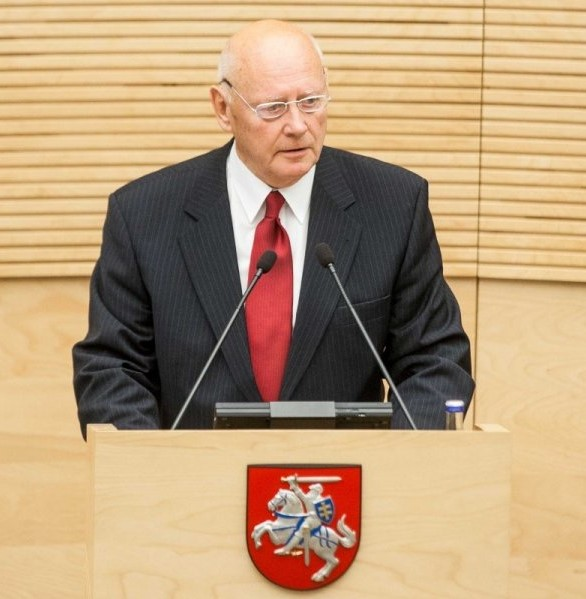
Image of Liudvikas Narcizas Rasimavičius

Liudvikas Narcizas Rasimavičius (22 December 1938 – 13 September 2023) was a Lithuanian politician. In 1990 he was among those who signed the Act of the Re-Establishment of the State of Lithuania.

Rasimavičius died on 13 September 2023, at the age of 84.

== Sources ==
- Biography
