= Kim No-sik =

South Korean politician (1945–2023)

Member of the National Assembly of South Korea
- In office 11 April 1981 – 12 May 1985
- In office 30 May 2008 – 29 May 2012

Personal details
- Born: 10 May 1945 Keishōhoku Province, Korea, Empire of Japan
- Died: 6 September 2023 (aged 78)
- Party: DKP; Pro-Pak Alliance

Kim No-sik (Korean: 김노식; 10 May 1945 – 6 September 2023) was a South Korean politician. A member of the Democratic Korea Party and later the Pro-Pak Alliance, he served in the National Assembly from 1981 to 1985 and again from 2008 to 2012.

Kim died on 6 September 2023, at the age of 78.
