= Herbert Faust =

German politician (1927–2023)

Member of the Landtag of North Rhine-Westphalia
- In office 26 July 1970 – 29 May 1985

Personal details
- Born: 18 July 1927 Ahlen, Westphalia, Prussia, Germany
- Died: 20 September 2023 (aged 96)
- Party: CDU
- Occupation: Chimney sweep

Herbert Faust (18 July 1927 – 20 September 2023) was a German chimney sweep and politician. A member of the Christian Democratic Union, he served in the Landtag of North Rhine-Westphalia from 1970 to 1985.

Faust died on 20 September 2023, at the age of 96.
