= Ethel Cook =

American politician

Chief of the Ottawa Tribe of Oklahoma
- In office May 2011 – September 17, 2023

Second chief of the Ottawa Tribe of Oklahoma
- In office 2007 – May 2011

Personal details
- Born: August 9, 1951 Miami, Oklahoma, U.S.
- Died: September 17, 2023 (aged 72) Miami, Oklahoma, U.S.
- Citizenship: American; Ottawa Tribe of Oklahoma

Ethel Cook was an Odawa politician who served as the chief of the Ottawa Tribe of Oklahoma from May 2011 until her death in September 2023. She had previously served as the second chief of the tribe between 2007 and 2011 and was the first woman elected to both offices.

== Early life and family ==
Ethel Cook was born on August 9, 1951, in Miami, Oklahoma. Her great-grandfather was Chief Joseph Badger King. She spent her career working for telecommunications companies, but returned to Miami when she retired in 2003.

== Political career ==
After returning to Miami, she served on the Ottawa Tribe of Oklahoma's Gaming Commission before being elected second chief of the Ottawa Tribe of Oklahoma in 2007. She was elected chief in May 2011, becoming the first woman to hold the office, and won re-election four more times.

During her tenure, she advocated for continuing the practice of the chief's office being unpaid. The tribe also expanded in Miami, Oklahoma, by building two tribal-owned gas stations and a restaurant. She oversaw the tribe during the aftermath of the McGirt v. Oklahoma (2020) decision, when the Ottawa Tribe of Oklahoma's reservation was found to have never been disestablished. She died in office on September 17, 2023.

== See also ==
- List of Native American politicians
- Native American women in politics
