= Ali Asghar Rahmani Khalili =

Iranian politician (1944–2023)

Ali Asghar Rahmani Khalili (Persian: علی‌اصغر رحمانی خلیلی; 1944 – 17 September 2023) was an Iranian politician who represented the Behshahr, Neka and Galougah constituencies in the first, second and sixth term of the Islamic Parliament of Iran.

== Biography ==
Ali Asghar Rahmani Khalili was born in Behshahr in 1944.

In the first round, he was elected to replace Ahmad Tavakoli in the midterm elections. He was the parliamentary deputy of Seyyed Mohammad Khatami during his tenure in the Ministry of Culture and Guidance. He was a member of the Association of Combatant Clerics and Assembly of the Forces of Imam's Line.

Khalili died on 17 September 2023, at the age of 79.
