= Gérald Bataille =

Haitian evangelical pastor (1954–2023)

- Born: Joseph Gérald Bataille; 8 January 1954; Les Cayes, Haiti
- Died: 11 September 2023 (aged 69); Port-au-Prince, Haiti
- Occupation: Evangelical pastor

Joseph Gérald Bataille (8 January 1954 – 11 September 2023) was a Haitian evangelical pastor.

Bataille was also a development agent, school official, and Haitian community leader.
