= Ray Anderson (journalist) =

American journalist (1927–2023)

- Born: Raymond Harold Anderson; 1927; U.S.
- Died: September 24, 2023 (aged 96); Middleton, Wisconsin, U.S.
- Education: University of Wisconsin–Eau Claire; University of Wisconsin–Madison; Columbia University
- Occupations: Political journalist Professor

Raymond Harold Anderson (commonly referred to as Ray Anderson,1927 – September 24, 2023) was an American journalist who worked at The New York Times as a foreign correspondent. He was also a professor emeritus at the University of Wisconsin–Madison's School of Journalism. He died on September 24, 2023 in Middleton, Wisconsin.

== Life and education ==
Anderson joined the Navy at the age of 17. After his military service, he attended the University of Wisconsin–Eau Claire where he studied pre-journalism. He then went to Los Angeles and studied photojournalism. Eventually he attended the University of Wisconsin–Madison and received a bachelor's degree and master's degree in Russian. After his graduate work in Madison, Anderson received a Fulbright Scholarship and subsequently studied at the Slavic Institute in Denmark. He later took classes in journalism at Columbia University.

== Career ==
When he returned from Denmark, Anderson began his career in journalism at a small newspaper in Virginia. It was there that he received a call from the New York Times. The paper was looking for a journalist who spoke fluent Russian. After a short trial period, the Times hired Anderson permanently. He worked at the New York Times for four years as a specialist on communism. Later, he worked as a general assignment reporter. Of his work, he said: "It's the best job in the world...being a general reporter for the New York Times in Manhattan. One moment you're doing an interview with Richard Nixon and the next afternoon you're covering a terrible homicide."

Eventually Anderson became a foreign correspondent. His first assignment was in Moscow. He spent three years in Russia, where he covered, among other things, the Soviet invasion of Czechoslovakia. While working in Moscow, Anderson played a central role in publishing Soviet dissident Andrei Sakharov's essay "Reflections on Progress, Peaceful Coexistence, and Intellectual Freedom." Of the events that led to the publication, Pavel Litvinov, a peace activist, wrote:

Karel gave the essay to Ray Anderson, a young, inexperienced, but also intelligent and honorable correspondent of the New York Times...after some delay, Ray Anderson sent it to the United States, where it was published in full in the New York Times on July 22. Sakharov's essay became a world sensation. In 1968-1969 more than 18 million copies of it were published around the world in more than a dozen languages.

After his stint in Moscow, Anderson went to Cairo where he covered the War of Attrition. "At one point, President Gamal Abdel Nasser attacked Anderson personally on the air for breaking a story he did not want published." Anderson also spent time as a foreign correspondent in Lebanon, Syria and most of Eastern Europe.

Anderson was on the faculty of the University of Wisconsin–Madison Journalism School from 1981 to 1996. He taught graduate courses that dealt with specialized reporting, feature writing, public affairs reporting, foreign reporting and editorial and column writing. While a professor at Madison, he would often return to the New York Times during summers and work at the copy desk. He also spent time working at the International Herald Tribune.

Anderson died on September 24, 2023, at the age of 96.
