= Nana Akosua Akyamaa III =

Queen mother of Juaben Traditional Area, Ashanti Region of Ghana

- Juabenhemaa
- Reign: 1994 – 10 September 2023
- Enstoolment: 1994
- Predecessor: Nana Akosua Akyamaa II
- Born: 1926; Ashanti Region, Gold Coast (now Ghana)
- Died: 10 September 2023 (aged 97)
- Mother: Nana Akosua Akyamaa II

Nana Akosua Akyamaa III (1926 – 10 September 2023) was the Queen mother (Juabenhemaa) of Asante Juaben Traditional Area in the Ashanti Region of Ghana. She was the third Queen mother of the Asante Juaben Traditional Council. Nana Otuo Siriboe II is the Omanhene of Asante Juaben Traditional Area.

== Early life ==
Akyamaa was born in 1926 to her mother, Nana Akosua Akyamaa II.

== Reign ==
Akyamaa was enstooled as the Juabenhemaa with the stool name Nana Akosua Akyamaa III, after succeeding her mother and predecessor Nana Akosua Akyamaa II who died in November 1994.
