= Richard M. Dellinger =

American politician (1936–2023)

Member of the Indiana House of Representatives
- In office 1972–1992

Personal details
- Born: February 18, 1936 Elwood, Indiana, U.S.
- Died: September 6, 2023 (aged 87)
- Party: Republican
- Education: Ball State University; Butler University

Richard M. Dellinger (February 18, 1936 – September 6, 2023) was an American politician. He served as a Republican member of the Indiana House of Representatives.

== Life and career ==
Richard M. Dellinger was born in Elwood, Indiana. He attended Ball State University and Butler University.

Dellinger was a teacher at Noblesville High School.

Dellinger served in the Indiana House of Representatives from 1972 to 1992.

Richard M. Dellinger died on September 6, 2023, at the age of 87.
