= Mayra Copas =

Bolivian model and television presenter (1995–2023)

- Born: 27 April 1995; Santa Cruz de la Sierra, Bolivia
- Died: 29 September 2023 (aged 28); Santa Cruz de la Sierra, Bolivia
- Height: 1.80 m (5 ft 11 in)
- Beauty pageant titleholder
- Title: Miss Santa Cruz 2013
- Hair color: Black
- Eye color: Brown
- Major competitions: Miss Bolivia 2013 (Runner up)

Mayra Alejandra Copas Sadud (27 April 1995 – 29 September 2023) was a Bolivian television presenter, model and beauty pageant titleholder who was crowned as Miss Santa Cruz 2013. This allowed her to represent the department of Santa Cruz in Miss Bolivia 2013 where she managed to place herself as first runner-up. She was later designated as Miss Model of the World Bolivia 2013 and later became a television presenter.

== Pageantry ==
On 21 March 2013, in a departmental beauty contest held by "Promociones Gloria" in the Sirionó salon of Fexpocruz, Copas was chosen as Miss Santa Cruz 2013, along with Claudia Tavel (as Miss Santa Cruz), Alejandra Aguilera (as Miss Litoral) and Cristina Montes (as Miss Litoral) managing to represent the department of Santa Cruz in Miss Bolivia 2013.

== Later life and career ==
In 2014, Copas married Elías Belmonte. On 1 February 2015, the first of her three children, a daughter, named Nayra Belmonte Copas was born. On 11 May 2015, Copas entered Bolivian television for the first time, starting to work on Red PAT, in the program "La Línea Divisoria", hosted by actor and television presenter Pablo Fernández.

== Illness and death ==
In October 2022, after intestinal surgery, Copas was diagnosed with pancreatic cancer. Shortly afterward, she died of the disease on 29 September 2023. She was 28.
