= Pierre Claisse =

French politician (1923–2023)

Deputy of the French National Assembly for Somme
- In office 19 April 1986 – 14 May 1988
- Preceded by: André Audinot
- Succeeded by: position abolished

Personal details
- Born: 30 November 1923 Cambrai, France
- Died: 9 September 2023 (aged 99) Landivisiau, France
- Party: UDF
- Occupation: Veterinarian

Pierre Claisse (30 November 1923 – 9 September 2023) was a French veterinarian and politician.

== Biography ==
Born in Cambrai on 30 November 1923, Claisse started his career as a veterinarian. A member of the Union for French Democracy (UDF), he served as Deputy Mayor of Villers-Bocage, Somme. He was also General Councillor of the Canton of Villers-Bocage and vice-president of the General Council of Somme.

After the death of André Audinot, Claisse became a member of the National Assembly for Somme on 19 April 1986, a position in which he served until 14 May 1988.

Pierre Claisse died in Landivisiau on 9 September 2023, at the age of 99.
