= Stevie Faye =

British comedian (1927–2023)

Steve Faye (1927 – 21 September 2023), also known as Stevie Faye, was a British comedian and actor from Liverpool. He was known for his appearances on the television show The Comedians, which ran from 1971 to 1993.

== Life and career ==
Faye was born in 1927 in Dingle, Liverpool, and grew up in Huyton. He worked as a candlemaker, kitchen porter and amateur boxer, before pursuing a career in comedy.

As a stand-up comedian, Faye found fame appearing on the television show The Comedians, featuring in 12 episodes from 1971 to 1974. He was also an actor, and appeared in the BBC2 drama Boys from the Blackstuff, playing a barman.

In May 1997, Faye officially retired from performing, aged 69. He prided himself on his clean material, having "never told a dirty joke".

In 2008, Faye joined a campaign to get fellow Liverpudlian comedian Ken Dodd knighted, something which would eventually take place in 2017. He was also a lifelong supporter of Liverpool F.C. and was friends with Billy Liddell, considered to be one of the club's greatest players.

Faye died on 21 September 2023, aged 95.
