= Francine Oputa =

American scholar (1953–2023)

- Born: May 31, 1953; San Fernando Valley, California, U.S.
- Died: September 14, 2023 (aged 70); Fresno, California, U.S.
- Education: California State University, Fresno
- Employer(s): California State University, Fresno
- Spouse: Henry Oputa

Francine Oputa (May 31, 1953 – September 14, 2023) was an American scholar, educator, social justice advocate and community leader in Fresno, California. She led diversity initiatives in her various roles at California State University, Fresno, and through her community service work in downtown Fresno.

== Early life and education ==
Francine Oputa was the youngest of eleven children. She was born in the San Fernando Valley to Rev Hillery T. and Mother Rosa L. Boradous. Her parents were community activists and leaders in California's San Fernando Valley. She married Pastor Henry Oputa in 1977.

Oputa graduated from Stanislaus State with a bachelor's degree in communications. Following this, she and her husband moved to Fresno in 1979, where she attended graduate school at California State University, Fresno (Fresno State). In 1984 she received a master's degree in media, communications and journalism. In 2011, Oputa received a doctorate of education (Ed.D.) from the University of California, Davis/Fresno State in educational leadership.

== Career and community service ==
Oputa started working at Fresno State in 1991 as the founding director of the Women's Resource Center. She also worked in the Division of Student Affairs and Enrollment Management and as director of the Cross Cultural and Gender Center. She lectured in Africana studies and women's studies.

With her husband Rev. Henry Oputa, she founded The Way Ministries...John 14:6 and Saturday School. They are known for their programs in downtown Fresno that "taught children ages 3 to 12 about African and African American culture and about self-image".

Oputa also served on Fresno city's Parks, Recreation and Arts Commission.

== Death ==
Francine Oputa died in Fresno on September 14, 2023, at the age of 70.

== Legacy ==
Oputa was known for her outreach with African-American and black children in Fresno and her work to increase diversity and inclusion at Fresno State. Over the course of her career she "led campus efforts in the areas of human relations, equity, conflict resolution and diversity."

Fresno State president, Saúl Jiménez-Sandoval referred to Oputa as an "unwavering champion for diversity, equity, and inclusion, serving as the guiding light for discussions on challenging issues with integrity, resolve, and visionary leadership." Previous Fresno State president, Dr. Joseph Castro, identified her as one of his "most influential advisors on issues related to campus culture". Her work has inspired wider diversity programs, such as Dr. Ramar Henderson's Racial Healing Circle at Fresno State.

== Awards ==
Year	Award	Organization
1993	Social Action Award for her "dedication to advocacy for women, children and the family, and to fostering respect for cultural diversity."	Temple Beth Israel
2006	Honored " for her work in promoting diversity and cultural inclusion throughout the Fresno community"	Fresno Metro Ministry
2020	Trailblazer Award, "a distinction given to members of the African American community for their “grand efforts, contributions and 'first' that they have endured for the good of the community.”	African American Historical and Cultural Museum
	24 Women of Influence	KSEE Channel 24
	Top Ten Professional Women	Marjaree Mason Center
