= Vasily Zimenok =

Russian-born Kazakh miner and politician (1934–2023)

- Василий Зименок

Member of the Soviet of the Union
- In office 1984–1989

Personal details
- Born: Vasily Petrovich Zimenok; 2 January 1934 Lyubovsho, Krasnogorsky District, Western Oblast, Russian SFSR, USSR
- Died: September 2023 (aged 89)
- Party: CPSU
- Occupation: Miner

Vasily Petrovich Zimenok (Russian: Василий Петрович Зименок; 2 January 1934 – September 2023) was a Kazakh miner and politician. A member of the Communist Party of the Soviet Union, he served in the Soviet of the Union from 1984 to 1989.

Zimenok died in September 2023, at the age of 89.
