= Wayne Greenstreet =

New Zealand cricketer (1949–2023)

Personal information
- Full name: Wayne Anthony Greenstreet
- Born: 21 January 1949; Lower Hutt, New Zealand
- Died: 7 September 2023 (aged 74); Blenheim, New Zealand
- Batting: Right-handed
- Bowling: Right-arm medium

Domestic team information
- Years: Team
- 1969/70–1972/73: Wellington
- 1973/74: Central Districts

Career statistics
| Competition | First-class | List A |
|---|---|---|
| Matches | 24 | 7 |
| Runs scored | 397 | 11 |
| Batting average | 18.04 | 3.66 |
| 100s/50s | 0/0 | 0/0 |
| Top score | 37 | 3* |
| Balls bowled | 5,072 | 416 |
| Wickets | 71 | 11 |
| Bowling average | 24.53 | 19.36 |
| 5 wickets in innings | 3 | 0 |
| 10 wickets in match | 0 | 0 |
| Best bowling | 5/34 | 3/27 |
| Catches/stumpings | 10/– | 1/– |
- Source: Cricinfo, 5 February 2021

Wayne Anthony Greenstreet (21 January 1949 – 7 September 2023) was a New Zealand cricketer. He played in 24 first-class and seven List A matches for Wellington and Central Districts from 1969 to 1974. A right-arm medium-pace bowler and useful lower-order batsman, his best first-class bowling figures were 5 for 34 for Wellington against Northern Districts in the Plunket Shield in January 1972.

Greenstreet died in Blenheim on 7 September 2023, at the age of 74.
