= Jerzy Orzeł =

Polish politician (1953–2023)

Member of the Sejm
- In office 18 June 1989 – 25 November 1991

Voivode of Tarnów
- In office 1991–1994
- Preceded by: Janusz Bystrzonowski
- Succeeded by: Wiesław Woda

Personal details
- Born: Jerzy Marian Orzeł; 27 March 1953 Żegocina, Poland
- Died: 9 September 2023 (aged 70)
- Party: OLP
- Education: AGH University of Krakow
- Occupation: Entrepreneur

Jerzy Marian Orzeł (27 March 1953 – 9 September 2023) was a Polish businessman and politician. A member of the Citizens Parliamentary Party, he served in the Sejm from 1989 to 1991.

Orzeł died on 9 September 2023, at the age of 70.
