= Catherine May Atlani =

French dancer, choreographer, and musician (1946–2023)

- Born: 12 May 1946; Algiers, French Algeria
- Died: 17 September 2023 (aged 77); Auxerre, France
- Occupations: Dancer; Choreographer; Musician

Catherine May Atlani (12 May 1946 – 17 September 2023) was a French dancer, choreographer, musician, and artistic director.

== Biography ==
Born in Algiers on 12 May 1946, Atlani grew up in a Jewish family that had been deported during World War II. She trained with choreographer Irène Popard and developed a strong, rebellious spirit and a feminist identity. During childhood, she trained in music and dance in France and the United States, particularly learning to play the piano.

In 1967, Atlani founded her own dance company, Les Ballets de la Cité. In 1969, she won a prize at the Concours chorégraphique international de Bagnolet and began participating in various tours and workshops across France. In 1971, she won a prize at the Ballet pour demain competition for her creation Prière de l’homme qui danse. In 1976, Les Ballets de la Cité settled in Le Grand-Quevilly, then in Darnétal. The company choreographed approximately 50 new dances and organized workshops and training for professional dancers.

In 1985, Atlani moved to Paris to present her latest creation at the Café de la Danse, of which she became co-director with Marie Pierre de Porta the following year. In 1996, the two founded the cabaret Le Loup du Faubourg and devoted themselves to French songs. She became a composer of piano music and began touring with artists in 2006 and taught vocal dance and fundamental singing techniques. In 2014, she returned to the dancing stage with Voyage mémoire, an original creation.

In 2008, Atlani composed her "Polyvoix" polyphonic music for string instruments and vocals. In 2011, she founded the choir ensemble Chœur Alpha. In 2012, she released the album Nos mémoires d’or. In 2015, she founded the Chœur de Femmes de La Madeleine, which gave a concert from her album, titled Les Passagers.

Catherine May Atlani died in Auxerre on 17 September 2023, at the age of 77.

== Publications ==
- Corps spirale, corps sonore (1991)
- Les nœuds énergétiques ou naître à soi-même (1993)

== Distinctions ==
- Knight of the Ordre des Arts et des Lettres (2001)

== Discography ==
- Nos mémoires d’or (2012)
- Les passagers (2016)
- J'y vais, je pars, je marche (2017)
- Pour une danse soufi (2018)
