= Ireneusz Michaś =

Polish politician (1938–2023)

Member of the Senate of Poland
- In office 15 October 1993 – 18 October 2001

Personal details
- Born: 14 May 1938 Pabianice, Poland
- Died: 4 September 2023 (aged 85)
- Party: SLD
- Education: University of Life Sciences in Lublin
- Occupation: Veterinarian

Ireneusz Michaś (14 May 1938 – 4 September 2023) was a Polish veterinarian and politician. A member of the Democratic Left Alliance, he served in the Senate from 1993 to 2001.

Michaś died on 4 September 2023, at the age of 85.
