= Barry M. Jensen =

American politician (1945–2023)

Member of the South Dakota House of Representatives
- In office 2001–2002
- In office 2005–2006

Personal details
- Born: August 13, 1945 Kadoka, South Dakota, U.S.
- Died: September 17, 2023 (aged 78)
- Party: Republican
- Education: Kansas State University

Barry M. Jensen (August 13, 1945 – September 17, 2023) was an American politician. He served as a Republican member of the South Dakota House of Representatives.

== Life and career ==
Barry M. Jensen was born in Kadoka, South Dakota on August 13, 1945. He attended Kansas State University.

Jensen served in the South Dakota House of Representatives from 2001 to 2002 and again from 2005 to 2006.

Jensen died on September 17, 2023, at the age of 78.
