= Gaetano Tanti =

Maltese trade unionist (died 2023)

Gaetano Tanti (1956/1957 – September 2023) was a Maltese trade unionist. He joined the Union Ħaddiema Magħqudin (Malta Workers' Union) in February 1976. In November 1987 he was appointed part-time Secretary of the General Service Section. In January 1991 he was appointed full-time Secretary of the same Section and a few months later the General Council of the Union appointed him also Assistant Secretary-General. He took the office of President of the UĦM in May 1998.

Tanti died in September 2023, at the age of 66.
