= 2023 in music =

This topic covers events and articles related to 2023 in music.

== Specific locations ==
- African music
- American music
- Asian music
- Australian music
- Brazilian music
- British music
- Canadian music
- Caribbean music
- Chinese music
- Czech music
- Danish music
- European music
- Finnish music
- French music
- German music
- Icelandic music
- Indonesian music
- Irish music
- Italian music
- Japanese music
- Latin music
- Malaysian music
- Mongolian music
- Norwegian music
- Philippine music
- Polynesian music
- Scandinavian music
- South Korean music
- Swedish music
- Taiwanese music
- Vietnamese music

== Specific genres ==
- Classical
- Country
- Electronic
- Jazz
- Latin
- Heavy metal
- Hip-hop
- R&B
- Progressive rock
- Rock
- K-pop
- J-pop

== Awards ==
65th Annual Grammy Awards (USA)
Record of the Year: "About Damn Time" by Lizzo • Album of the Year: Harry's House by Harry Styles • Song of the Year: "Just Like That" by Bonnie Raitt • Best New Artist: Samara Joy
2023 Billboard Music Awards (USA)
Top Artist: Taylor Swift • Top New Artist: Zach Bryan • Top Billboard 200 Album: One Thing at a Time by Morgan Wallen • Top Hot 100 Song: "Last Night" by Morgan Wallen
2023 Brit Awards (UK)
British Album of the Year: Harry's House by Harry Styles • Best British Song: "As It Was" by Harry Styles • British Artist of the Year: Harry Styles • Best New Artist: Wet Leg • British Group: Wet Leg
2023 Juno Awards (Canada)
Artist of the Year: The Weeknd • Group of the Year: Arkells • Album of the Year: "Dawn FM" by The Weeknd • Single of the Year: "Sacrifice" by The Weeknd
2023 MAMA Awards (Asia)
Artist of the Year: NewJeans • Album of the Year: FML by Seventeen • Song of the Year: "Ditto" by NewJeans • Best Music Video: "Flower" by Jisoo
2023 MTV Video Music Awards Japan (Japan)
Video of the Year: "Que Sera Sera" by Mrs. Green Apple • Artist of the Year: Mrs. Green Apple • Song of the Year: "Idol" by Yoasobi • Album of the Year: Ima no Futari o Otagai ga Miteru by Aiko
2023 MTV Video Music Awards (USA)
Video of the Year: "Anti-Hero" by Taylor Swift • Song of the Year: "Anti-Hero" by Taylor Swift • Best New Artist: Ice Spice • Push Performance of the Year: Tomorrow X Together
2023 MTV Europe Music Awards (Europe)
Ceremony cancelled

Best Song: "Seven" by Jungkook featuring Latto • Best Video: "Anti-Hero" by Taylor Swift • Best Artist: Taylor Swift • Best New: Peso Pluma

37th Golden Disc Awards (South Korea)
Digital Daesang: "Love Dive" by Ive • Disc Daesang: Proof by BTS • Rookie Artist of the Year: Ive, Le Sserafim, NewJeans • Artist of the Year: Psy
65th Japan Record Awards (Japan)
Grand Prix winner: "Que Sera Sera" by Mrs. Green Apple
Pulitzer Prize for Music (USA)
Omar by Rhiannon Giddens and Michael Abels
Rock and Roll Hall of Fame (USA)
Performers: Kate Bush • Sheryl Crow • Missy Elliott • George Michael • Willie Nelson • Rage Against the Machine • The Spinners Musical Influences: DJ Kool Herc • Link Wray Ahmet Ertegun Award (Non-performers): Don Cornelius Musical Excellence: Chaka Khan • Bernie Taupin • Al Kooper
Mercury Prize (UK)
Where I'm Meant to Be by Ezra Collective
Polar Music Prize (Sweden)
Chris Blackwell • Angélique Kidjo • Arvo Pärt
2023 iHeartRadio Music Awards (USA)
Song of the Year: "Anti-Hero" by Taylor Swift • Artist of the Year: Harry Styles • Best Music Video: "Yet To Come" by BTS
Polaris Music Prize (Canada)
Good Luck by Debby Friday
Eurovision Song Contest 2023 (Europe)
"Tattoo" by Loreen (Sweden)
32nd Seoul Music Awards (South Korea)
Grand Prize: NCT Dream • Best Album: BTS • Best Song: "After Like" by Ive • Best New Artist: The New Six, Le Sserafim, NewJeans

== Bands formed ==
- 8Turn
- BB Girls
- Ave Mujica
- Babymonster
- BoyNextDoor
- Candy Tune
- DXTeen
- Evnne
- El7z Up
- Fantasy Boys
- Hori7on
- IMP.
- The Jet Boy Bangerz from Exile Tribe
- Kiss Kiss
- Kiss of Life
- LimeLight
- Loossemble
- Lun8
- Mave:
- MiSaMo
- NCT Tokyo
- Primrose
- Riize
- TripleS
- Whom Gods Destroy
- Xikers
- Xodiac
- ¥$
- Zerobaseone

== Soloist debuts ==
- Allie Sherlock
- Ayaka Fukuhara
- Chloe Stroll
- Chuu
- Halle Bailey
- Himika Akaneya
- Hwang Min-hyun
- Jang Ye-eun
- Jeffrey Ngai
- Jihyo
- Jimin
- Jinyoung
- Jisoo
- Joel Deleōn
- Josh Cullen
- Joohoney
- Jungkook
- Kaori Maeda
- Klavdia Petrivna
- Kylie Cantrall
- Lee Mi-joo
- Leigh-Anne
- Marife Yau
- Marco Ip
- Mayu Mineda
- Mayu Sagara
- Nako Misaki
- Nancy Kwai
- Ren
- Roksana Węgiel
- Roxy Dekker
- Sica Ho
- Shiori Tamai
- Swan
- Taeyong
- V
- Win Win Yeung

== Bands reformed ==
- 3 Inches of Blood
- The Beatles (a one off recording)
- Blessthefall
- Bloodhound Gang
- Blur
- Bratmobile
- The Buggles
- Creed
- Crimson Glory
- The Dillinger Escape Plan
- Dogstar
- Fightstar
- Frankie Goes to Hollywood
- Girls Aloud
- Heavenly
- The Last Goodnight
- Love and Rockets
- Mallory Knox
- *NSYNC
- NX Zero
- Power Trip
- RBD
- Restart
- Savatage
- S Club
- Silent Siren
- Sublime
- The Soup Dragons
- Twisted Sister

== Bands disbanded ==
- The Agonist
- ...And You Will Know Us by the Trail of Dead
- Anti-Flag
- Astro – Jinjin & Rocky
- Astro – Moonbin & Sanha
- Bandage
- Barnes & Barnes
- Betraying the Martyrs
- Bish
- Bjesovi
- Brave Girls
- Boysgroup
- B.O.L.T
- Camp Cope
- Candlebox
- Chancho en Piedra
- Clannad
- CNCO
- Coast Modern
- The Comet Is Coming
- D1ce
- Dawn Ray'd
- Died Pretty
- Dilly Dally
- Egoist
- Emerson String Quartet
- For Tracy Hyde
- GWSN
- Helvetia
- Injury Reserve
- Jars of Clay
- Kiss
- Kix
- Momoland
- Muncie Girls
- MS MR
- Palisades
- Palm
- Panic! at the Disco
- PRETTYMUCH
- The Regrettes
- Russkaja
- Screaming Females
- Skinny Puppy
- Snuper
- Sprain
- Strange Ranger
- VIXX LR
- Westkust

== Bands on hiatus ==
- Blood Youth
- Blur
- DNCE
- The Mamas
- Walk the Moon

== Deaths ==
=== January ===
- 1
  - Gangsta Boo, 43, American rapper (Three 6 Mafia)
  - Sebastian Marino, 57, American metal guitarist (Overkill, Anvil)
  - Fred White, 67, American funk drummer (Earth, Wind & Fire)
- 2
  - Andrew Downes, 72, British classical composer
  - Kingsize Taylor, 83, British rock and roll singer and guitarist (Kingsize Taylor and the Dominoes)
- 3
  - Joseph Koo, 91, Hong Kong film composer
  - Notis Mavroudis, 77, Greek classical guitarist and composer
  - Alan Rankine, 64, Scottish post-punk keyboardist and guitarist (The Associates)
- 4
  - Stan Hitchcock, 86, American country music singer and co-founder of CMT
  - Zoran Kalezić, 72, Serbian-Montenegrin folk singer
  - Beeyar Prasad, 61, Indian film lyricist
- 5
  - Mark Capps, 54, American sound engineer
  - Gordy Harmon, 79, American R&B and soul singer (The Whispers)
- 6
  - Jeff Blackburn, 77, American rock guitarist and songwriter (Blackburn & Snow, Moby Grape)
  - Danny Kaleikini, 85, American Hawaiian pop singer
- 7 – Aleksandr Kharchikov, 73, Russian folk singer-songwriter
- 8 – Slim Newton, 90, Australian country music singer-songwriter
- 9
  - Séamus Begley, 73, Irish folk fiddler and accordionist
  - Dick Flood, 90, American country music singer-songwriter
  - Magnar Mangersnes, 84, Norwegian classical organist and choral conductor
  - Yoriaki Matsudaira, 91, Japanese classical composer
- 10
  - Jeff Beck, 78, British rock guitarist (The Yardbirds, The Jeff Beck Group, Beck, Bogert & Appice, The Honeydrippers)
  - Dennis Budimir, 84, American jazz and rock guitarist (The Wrecking Crew)
  - José Evangelista, 79, Spanish classical composer
- 11 – Yukihiro Takahashi, 70, Japanese electronic and rock drummer and singer (Yellow Magic Orchestra, Sadistic Mika Band, METAFIVE)
- 12
  - Robbie Bachman, 69, Canadian rock drummer (Bachman-Turner Overdrive)
  - Lisa Marie Presley, 54, American country rock singer-songwriter
  - Laylaw, American hip hop record producer.
- 13
  - Keith Beaton, 72, American R&B singer (Blue Magic)
  - Ray Cordeiro, 98, Hong Kong disc jockey (RTHK Radio 3)
- 14 – Matthias Carras, 58, German pop singer
- 15
  - Doris, 75, Swedish pop singer
  - Bruce Gowers, 82, British music video director
  - C. J. Harris, 31, American country singer
  - Vakhtang Kikabidze, 84, Georgian singer
- 16 – Johnny Powers, American rockabilly singer and guitarist
- 17
  - Van Conner, 55, American alternative rock bassist (Screaming Trees)
  - Manana Doijashvili, 75, Georgian classical pianist
  - Leon Dubinsky, 81, Canadian folk composer
  - Renée Geyer, 69, Australian pop singer
  - Larry Morris, 75, New Zealand garage rock singer (Larry's Rebels)
  - Richard Oesterreicher, 90, Austrian jazz guitarist and conductor
- 18
  - David Crosby, 81, American folk rock singer-songwriter (The Byrds, Crosby, Stills, Nash & Young)
  - Victor Rasgado, 63, Mexican classical pianist and composer
  - Gary Smith, American record producer (death announced on this date)
  - Marcel Zanini, 99, Turkish-born French jazz clarinetist
- 19 – Alex Napier, 75, English hard rock drummer (Uriah Heep)
- 20
  - Stella Chiweshe, 76, Zimbabwean folk mbira player
  - Loïc Guguen, French opera singer
  - Nick Todd, 87, American pop singer
- 21 – B.G., the Prince of Rap, 57, American rapper
- 22
  - Easley Blackwood Jr., 89, American classical and electronic composer and pianist
  - Lin Brehmer, 68, American disc jockey and radio personality (WXRT)
  - Zhanna Pliyeva, 73, Georgian classical composer and pianist
- 23
  - Carol Sloane, 85, American jazz singer
  - Top Topham, 75, English blues rock guitarist (The Yardbirds)
- 26
  - Dean Daughtry, 76, American rock keyboardist (The Candymen, Classics IV, Atlanta Rhythm Section)
  - Peter McCann, 74, American songwriter and singer
- 27 – Floyd Sneed, 80, Canadian rock drummer (Three Dog Night)
- 28
  - Odd Børre, 83, Norwegian pop singer
  - David Challinor, Australian indie rock singer-songwriter and guitarist (Sounds Like Sunset)
  - Barrett Strong, 81, American R&B singer-songwriter
  - Tom Verlaine, 73, American art punk singer-songwriter and guitarist (Television)
- 29
  - Heddy Lester, 72, Dutch pop singer
  - Gabriel Tacchino, 88, French classical pianist
- 31
  - Donnie Marsico, 68, American rock singer (The Jaggerz)
  - Charlie Thomas, 85, American R&B singer (The Drifters)

=== February ===
- 1
  - Lucy Quintero, 74, Panamanian folk singer
  - George Zukerman, 95, Canadian classical bassoonist
- 2
  - Butch Miles, 78, American jazz drummer
  - Tim Quy, 61, English post-punk percussionist and keyboardist (Cardiacs)
- 3 – Paul Janovitz, 54, American alternative rock singer and guitarist (Cold Water Flat)
- 4 – Vani Jairam, 77, Indian playback singer
- 5
  - Phil Spalding, 65, English rock bassist (GTR, Original Mirrors, Toyah)
  - Lillian Walker, 78, American R&B singer (The Exciters)
- 7
  - Mendelson Joe, 78, Canadian folk singer-songwriter
  - Steve Sostak, 49, American experimental rock singer and saxophonist (Sweep the Leg Johnny) (death announced on this date)
- 8
  - Burt Bacharach, 94, American pop songwriter and composer
  - Dennis Lotis, 97, South African-born British swing singer
- 10
  - AKA, 35, South African rapper
  - Joe Millar, 87, Northern Irish folk singer and musician (The Irish Rovers)
- 11 – Tito Fernández, 80, Chilean folk singer-songwriter
- 12 – David Jolicoeur, 54, American rapper (De La Soul)
- 13
  - Tim Aymar, 59, American progressive metal singer (Pharaoh, Control Denied)
  - Guido Basso, 85, Canadian jazz trumpeter
  - Alain Goraguer, 91, French jazz pianist, arranger and composer
  - Huey "Piano" Smith, 89, American R&B pianist
  - Spencer Wiggins, 81, American soul singer
- 14
  - Friedrich Cerha, 96, Austrian classical composter and conductor
  - Peter Renkens, 55, Belgian new beat singer (Confetti's) (death announced on this date)
  - Akira Tsuneoka, 51, Japanese pop punk drummer (Hi-Standard)
- 15 – Raquel Welch, 82, American dance singer
- 16
  - Chuck Jackson, 85, American R&B singer
  - Michael Kupper, 65, German heavy metal guitarist (Running Wild)
  - Maon Kurosaki, 35, Japanese pop singer
  - Marilú, 95, Mexican bolero singer
  - Tony Marshall, 85, German schlager and opera singer
  - Alberto Radius, 80, Italian pop rock guitarist and singer-songwriter (Formula 3)
- 17
  - Otis Barthoulameu, American pop punk singer and guitarist (Fluf, Olivelawn) (death announced on this date)
  - Jerry Dodgion, 90, American jazz saxophonist and flautist
  - Gerald Fried, 95, American film and television composer
  - Kyle Jacobs, 49, American songwriter
  - Vijay Kichlu, 92, Indian classical singer
  - Hans Poulsen, 77, Australian soft rock singer-songwriter
  - Tom Whitlock, 68, American pop rock songwriter
- 19 – Davis Causey, 74, American Southern rock guitarist (Sea Level)
- 20
  - Bruce Barthol, 75, American psychedelic rock bassist (Country Joe and the Fish)
  - Victor Brox, 81, English blues singer
  - Lyubomyr Futorsky, 50, Ukrainian rock singer (Dead Rooster)
  - Tom Stephen, 68, Canadian blues rock drummer (The Jeff Healey Band)
- 21
  - Ron Altbach, 76, American rock keyboardist (King Harvest, Celebration)
  - Jesse Gress, 67, American rock guitarist
- 23
  - Slim Borgudd, 76, Swedish rock drummer (Lea Riders Group)
  - Junnosuke Kuroda, 34, Japanese rock guitarist (Sumika)
- 25 – Walter Ferguson, 103, Panamanian-born Costa Rican calypso singer-songwriter
- 27 – Ismaïla Touré, 73, Senegalese Mbalax singer and percussionist (Touré Kunda)

=== March ===
- 1
  - Wally Fawkes, 98, British-Canadian jazz clarinettist
  - Leon Hughes, 92, American R&B singer (The Coasters)
  - Neela Ramgopal, 87, Indian Carnatic singer
  - Irma Serrano, 89, Mexican ranchera and corrido singer
- 2
  - Johnny Johnson, 80, American soul singer (Johnny Johnson and the Bandwagon)
  - Steve Mackey, 56, British indie rock bassist (Pulp) and record producer
  - Wayne Shorter, 89, American jazz saxophonist (Miles Davis Quintet, Weather Report, The Jazz Messengers)
  - Gothart Stier, 84, German classical singer, organist and conductor
- 3
  - David Lindley, 78, American singer-songwriter and guitarist (Kaleidoscope)
  - Calvin Newton, 93, American gospel singer (The Oak Ridge Boys, Sons of Song)
- 4
  - Sueli Costa, 79, Brazilian MPB composer and singer
  - Robert Haimer, 69, American comedy rock singer-songwriter (Barnes & Barnes)
  - Michael Rhodes, 69, American country bassist (The Notorious Cherry Bombs)
  - Spot, 72, American record producer and engineer
  - James "Owl" Walsh, 74, American rock singer and keyboardist (Gypsy)
- 5
  - Arif Cooper, Jamaican reggae DJ and multi-instrumentalist
  - Gary Rossington, 71, American Southern rock guitarist (Lynyrd Skynyrd, Rossington Collins Band)
- 6 – Eric Alan Livingston, 38, American experimental metal multi-instrumentalist
- 7 – Michael Brimer, 89, South African-Australian classical organist and conductor
- 8
  - Jim Durkin, 58, American thrash metal guitarist (Dark Angel)
  - Josua Madsen, 45, Danish thrash metal drummer (Artillery)
- 9 – Robin Lumley, 74, British jazz keyboardist (Brand X)
- 10
  - Junior English, 71–72, Jamaican reggae singer
  - Napoleon XIV, 84, American novelty singer-songwriter
- 11 – Costa Titch, 27, South African rapper
- 12 – Marek Kopelent, 90, Czech classical composer
- 13
  - Simon Emmerson, 67, English jazz and worldbeat guitarist (Weekend, Working Week, Afro Celt Sound System)
  - Jim Gordon, 77, American rock drummer (Derek and the Dominos, The Wrecking Crew, Traffic) and songwriter
  - Canisso, 57, Brazilian rock bassist (Raimundos)
- 14
  - Bobby Caldwell, 71, American singer-songwriter
  - Dix Denney, American punk guitarist (The Weirdos, Thelonious Monster) (death announced on this date)
- 15 – Théo de Barros, 80, Brazilian jazz multi-instrumentalist and composer (Quarteto Novo)
- 16 – Tony Coe, 88, English jazz clarinetist and saxophonist
- 17
  - Fuzzy Haskins, 81, American R&B and funk singer (Parliament-Funkadelic, The Parliaments)
  - Fito Olivares, 75, Mexican cumbia saxophonist
  - Mick Slattery, 77, British space rock guitarist (Hawkwind)
- 20 – Dmitry Nova, 34, Russian synthpop and house producer (Cream Soda)
- 21
  - Oleksandr Kozarenko, 59, Ukrainian classical pianist and composer
  - Anita Thallaug, 85, Norwegian pop singer
- 22
  - Tom Leadon, 70, American rock guitarist (Mudcrutch)
  - Wayne Swinny, 59, American nu metal guitarist (Saliva)
- 23
  - Luca Bergia, 54, Italian alternative rock drummer (Marlene Kuntz)
  - Keith Reid, 76, English psychedelic rock lyricist and songwriter (Procol Harum)
  - Peter Shelley, 80, English pop singer-songwriter
- 25
  - Juca Chaves, 84, Brazilian comedy pop singer
  - Nick Lloyd Webber, 43, English theatre and television composer
- 26 – Ray Pillow, 85, American country singer
- 27
  - James Bowman, 81, English opera singer
  - Daniel Chorzempa, 78, American classical organist and composer
  - Emahoy Tsegué-Maryam Guèbrou, 99, Ethiopian classical pianist and composer
  - Howie Kane, 81, American pop singer (Jay and the Americans) (death announced on this date)
  - Jocelyn Morlock, 53, Canadian classical composer
  - Peggy Scott-Adams, 74, American blues and R&B singer
- 28
  - Blas Durán, 73, Dominican bachata singer
  - Sanath Nandasiri, 81, Sri Lankan playback and pop singer
  - Ryuichi Sakamoto, 71, Japanese electronic keyboardist (Yellow Magic Orchestra) and composer
- 29
  - Brian Gillis, 48, American pop singer (LFO)
  - Sweet Charles Sherrell, 80, American R&B and funk bassist (The J.B.'s)
- 30
  - Alfio Cantarella, 81, Italian rock drummer (Equipe 84)
  - Mark Russell, 90, American musical comedy singer and pianist
  - Ray Shulman, 73, English progressive rock multi-instrumentalist (Gentle Giant), songwriter and record producer
  - Caroline "Care Failure" Kawa, 36, Canadian alternative rock singer (Die Mannequin)

=== April ===
- 2
  - Pedro Lavirgen, 92, Spanish opera singer
  - Seymour Stein, 80, American music executive and founder of Sire Records
- 3
  - Andrew Laing, British punk drummer (Cockney Rejects)
  - Rena Koumioti, 81, Greek new wave singer
  - Jack Vreeswijk, 59, Swedish folk singer and composer
- 4 – Vivian Trimble, 59, American alternative rock keyboardist and singer (Luscious Jackson, Dusty Trails, Kostars)
- 5 – Duško Gojković, 91, Serbian jazz trumpeter, composer, and arranger
- 6
  - Paul Cattermole, 46, English pop singer (S Club 7)
  - Nora Forster, 80, German music promoter
- 7
  - Guy Bailey, British hard rock guitarist and songwriter (The Quireboys)
  - Ian Bairnson, 69, Scottish rock guitarist and saxophonist (The Alan Parsons Project, Pilot)
  - Kidd Jordan, 87, American jazz saxophonist
  - John Regan, 71, American hard rock bassist (Frehley's Comet)
  - Lasse Wellander, 70, Swedish pop guitarist (ABBA)
- 8 – Bob Heatlie, 76, Scottish songwriter and record producer
- 9
  - Karl Berger, 88, German jazz pianist
  - Valter Dešpalj, 75, Croatian classical cellist
  - Chuck Morris, 46, American jam band percussionist (Lotus) (body discovered on this date)
- 11 – Cynara, 78, Brazilian bossa nova singer (Quarteto em Cy)
- 12 – Jah Shaka, Jamaican dub and reggae sound system operator (death announced on this date)
- 14
  - Cliff Fish, 73, English pop bassist (Paper Lace)
  - Mark Sheehan, 46, Irish pop rock guitarist (The Script)
- 15 – Peter Badie, 97, American jazz bassist
- 16 – Ahmad Jamal, 92, American jazz pianist
- 17
  - Ivan Conti, 76, Brazilian jazz-funk drummer (Azymuth)
  - April Stevens, 93, American pop singer (Nino Tempo & April Stevens)
- 18 – Otis Redding III, 59, American funk and soul singer and guitarist (The Reddings)
- 19
  - Moonbin, 25, South Korean K-pop singer (Astro)
  - Ron "Patch" Hamilton, 72, American Christian pop singer-songwriter
  - Martin Petzold, 67, German classical singer (Thomanerchor)
  - Carlo Saba, 54, Indonesian jazz pop singer (Kahitna)
  - Federico Salvatore, 63, Italian pop singer-songwriter
- 20 – Pamela Chopra, 75, Indian playback singer
- 21 – Mark Stewart, 62, English post-punk singer-songwriter (The Pop Group)
- 22 – Ron Cahute, 68, Canadian folk singer-songwriter and accordionist
- 23
  - Keith Gattis, 52, American country singer-songwriter
  - Isaac Wiley Jr., 69, American funk drummer (Dazz Band)
- 24 – Lilian Day Jackson, 63, American disco singer (Spargo)
- 25
  - Harry Belafonte, 96, American calypso and pop singer
  - Ralph Humphrey, 79, American psychedelic rock drummer (The Mothers of Invention)
  - Manfred Weiss, 88, German classical composer
- 26 – Billy "The Kid" Emerson, 97, American rock and roll singer-songwriter (death announced on this date)
- 27 – Wee Willie Harris, 90, English rock and roll singer
- 28
  - Tim Bachman, 71, Canadian rock guitarist (Bachman-Turner Overdrive, Brave Belt)
  - Helge Engelke, 61, German hard rock guitarist (Fair Warning)
  - Johnny Fean, 71, Irish Celtic rock guitarist (Horslips, Zen Alligators)
  - Claude Gray, 91, American country music singer
- 29 – Don Sebesky, 85, American jazz multi-instrumentalist, composer, arranger, and conductor
- 30 – Broderick Smith, 75, Australian rock singer and harmonica player (Carson, The Dingoes)

=== May ===
- 1
  - Gordon Lightfoot, 84, Canadian folk singer-songwriter
  - Pugh Rogefeldt, 76, Swedish psychedelic pop singer-songwriter
- 3
  - Moulay Tahar Al Asbahani, 75, Moroccan funk and gnawa singer (Jil Jilala)
  - John Albert, 53, American punk guitarist and drummer (Christian Death, Bad Religion)
  - Linda Lewis, 72, English pop and soul singer-songwriter
- 4
  - Rob Laakso, 44, American indie rock guitarist (Kurt Vile and the Violators, Swirlies)
  - Karaikudi Mani, 77, Indian Carnatic mridangam player
  - Jasmin Stavros, 68, Croatian pop singer
- 5
  - Chris Strachwitz, 91, American record company founder and executive (Arhoolie Records)
  - Jack Wilkins, 78, American jazz guitarist
- 6 – Menahem Pressler, 99, German-born Israeli-American classical pianist (Beaux Arts Trio)
- 7
  - Grace Bumbry, 86, American opera singer
  - Soňa Červená, 97, Czech opera singer
  - Seán Keane, 76, Irish Celtic fiddler (The Chieftains)
- 8 – Rita Lee, 75, Brazilian Tropicália and psychedelic rock singer-songwriter (Os Mutantes)
- 9
  - Liudmila Kovnatskaya, 82, Russian musicologist
  - Jon Povey, 80, British rock drummer and keyboardist (Pretty Things, Bern Elliott and the Fenmen)
  - Joaquin Romaguera, 90, American opera singer
  - Günter Wewel, 88, German opera singer
- 10
  - Rolf Harris, 93, Australian pop singer and multi-instrumentalist
  - Stu James, 77, British rock singer (The Mojos)
- 11 – Francis Monkman, 73, English progressive rock guitarist, keyboardist and songwriter (Curved Air, Sky, Matching Mole)
- 12 – Dum-Dum, 54, Brazilian rapper (Facção Central)
- 13 – Arno Veimer|et, 50, Estonian hard rock guitarist and lyricist (Terminaator)
- 14
  - John Giblin, 71, Scottish rock and jazz bassist (Brand X)
  - Ingrid Haebler, 93, Austrian classical pianist
- 15 – Bernt Rosengren, 85, Swedish jazz saxophonist (death announced on this date)
- 16
  - Richard Landis, 77, American country singer-songwriter and record producer
  - Lester Sterling, 87, Jamaican ska saxophonist (The Skatalites, Byron Lee and the Dragonaires)
- 17 – Algy Ward, 63, English punk and heavy metal bassist (Tank, The Damned, The Saints)
- 19
  - Pete Brown, 82, English rock singer and lyricist
  - Andy Rourke, 59, English indie rock bassist (The Smiths)
- 20
  - Paul Desenne, 63, Venezuelan classical cellist and composer
  - Sven Nyhus, 90, Norwegian folk fiddler
- 21
  - Ed Ames, 95, American pop singer (Ames Brothers)
  - Thotakura Somaraju, 68, Indian film composer
- 22
  - Kirk Arrington, 61, American heavy metal drummer (Metal Church)
  - Ferus Mustafov, 72, Macedonian folk saxophonist
  - Chas Newby, 81, British rock bassist (The Beatles)
- 23
  - Mark Adams, 64, American doom metal bassist (Saint Vitus)
  - Redd Holt, 91, American jazz drummer (The Ramsey Lewis Trio, Young-Holt Unlimited)
  - Floyd Newman, 91, American R&B and soul saxophonist (The Mar-Keys, The Memphis Horns)
  - Sheldon Reynolds, 63, American funk and R&B guitarist (Sun, Commodores, Earth, Wind & Fire)
- 24
  - Javier Álvarez, 67, Mexican classical composer
  - Jack Martin Händler, 75, Slovak classical violinist and conductor
  - Bill Lee, 94, American jazz bassist and film composer
  - George Maharis, 94, American pop singer
  - Tina Turner, 83, American-born Swiss rock and R&B singer (Ike & Tina Turner)
- 25
  - Joy McKean, 93, Australian country singer-songwriter
  - Jean-Louis Murat, 71, French pop singer-songwriter
- 26
  - Jack Lee, 71, American power pop singer-songwriter and guitarist (The Nerves)
  - Reuben Wilson, 88, American jazz organist
- 28 - George Cassidy, 86, Northern Irish jazz saxophonist and music teacher of Van Morrison
- 31 – Dickie Harrell, 82, American rock and roll drummer (Gene Vincent and the Blue Caps)

=== June ===
- 1
  - Pacho El Antifeka, 42, Puerto Rican rapper
  - Roy Taylor, Irish pop rock singer and bassist (Jump the Gun)
  - Cynthia Weil, 82, American pop songwriter
  - Kurt Widmer, 82, Swiss classical singer (death announced on this date)
- 2 – Kaija Saariaho, 70, Finnish classical composer
- 4
  - Dora María, 89, Mexican folk singer
  - George Winston, 74, American new age and R&B pianist
- 5 – Astrud Gilberto, 83, Brazilian samba and bossa nova singer
- 6 – Tony McPhee, 79, English blues rock guitarist (The Groundhogs)
- 7 – Banani Ghosh, Indian Rabindra Sangeet singer
- 8 – Peter Belli, 79, Danish pop singer
- 9 – Niel Immelman, 78, South African classical pianist (death announced on this date)
- 10 – Yannis Markopoulos, 84, Greek classical and film composer
- 11 – Suna Kan, 86, Turkish classical violinist
- 13
  - Christy Dignam, 63, Irish rock singer (Aslan)
  - Blackie Onassis, 57, American alternative rock drummer (Urge Overkill)
- 14 – Sharda, 85, Indian playback singer
- 15
  - Sergey Kolchin, 45, Russian rock guitarist (Zemlyane)
  - Dan Lardner, American indie rock singer and guitarist (QTY) (death announced on this date)
  - Luiz Schiavon, 64, Brazilian keyboardist (RPM)
- 16 – Peter Dickinson, 88, English classical composer and musicologist
- 17 – Dave Maclean, 78, Brazilian pop rock singer-songwriter
- 18
  - Big Pokey, 48, American rapper (Screwed Up Click)
  - Nasrollah Nasehpour, 82, Iranian radif singer
  - Krzysztof Olesiński, 70, Polish rock bassist (Maanam)
  - Cornel Țăranu, 88, Romanian classical composer
  - Teresa Taylor, 60, American alternative rock drummer (Butthole Surfers)
- 19
  - Max Morath, 96, American ragtime pianist
  - Gabriele Schnaut, 72, German opera singer
  - Ryan Siew, 26, Australian metalcore guitarist (Polaris)
- 20
  - Choi Sung-bong, 33, South Korean singer
  - Vyacheslav Nagovitsin, 83, Russian classical composer
  - John Waddington, 63, English post-punk guitarist (The Pop Group, Maximum Joy, Perfume)
  - Paolo Zavallone, 90, Italian disco singer
- 22
  - Robert Black, 67, American classical bassist (Bang on a Can All Stars)
  - Peter Brötzmann, 82, German jazz saxophonist
- 23
  - Sheldon Harnick, 99, American musical theater lyricist and songwriter
  - Jesse McReynolds, 93, American bluegrass mandolinist, singer and songwriter (Jim & Jesse)
  - Lee Rauch, 58, American metal drummer (Megadeth, Dark Angel)
- 24
  - Claude Barzotti, 69, Belgian pop singer
  - Rachel Yakar, 87, French opera singer
- 25 – Tapas Das, 68, Indian rock singer-songwriter (Moheener Ghoraguli)
- 27 – Bobby Osborne, 91, American bluegrass mandolinist and singer (Osborne Brothers)
- 30
  - Lord Creator, 87, Trinidad-born Jamaican calypso and ska singer-songwriter
  - Monte Cazazza, American industrial composer and singer (death announced on this date)
  - Rick Froberg, 55, American post-hardcore singer and guitarist (Drive Like Jehu, Hot Snakes, Obits, Pitchfork)

=== July ===
- 2 – Margaret Nisbett, 94, Australian opera singer
- 3
  - Vicki Anderson, 83, American soul singer (death announced on this date)
  - Mo Foster, 78, English rock and pop multi-instrumentalist (Affinity, Fancy, RMS)
  - Sudakshina Sarma, 88, Indian borgeet singer
- 4
  - Jenő Jandó, 71, Hungarian classical pianist
  - Canelita Medina, 84, Venezuelan salsa singer
  - Robin Tamang, 60, Nepalese hard rock singer
- 5
  - Rob Agerbeek, 85, Indonesian-born Dutch jazz pianist
  - Anthony Gilbert, 88, British classical composer
  - Coco Lee, 48, Hong Kong-American pop singer-songwriter
  - Ralph Lundsten, 86, Swedish classical composer
  - Martin Stevens, 69, Canadian pop singer
  - George Tickner, 76, American rock guitarist (Journey, Frumious Bandersnatch) (death announced on this date)
- 6
  - Graham Clark, 81, English opera singer
  - Peter Nero, 89, American pop and classical pianist and conductor (Philly Pops)
  - Caleb Southern, 53, American record producer
- 8
  - Victor Pikayzen, 90, Russian classical violinist
  - Özkan Uğur, 69, Turkish rock bassist (MFÖ)
- 10
  - Ernst-Ludwig Petrowsky, 89, German jazz multi-instrumentalist
  - Bob Segarini, 77, American-Canadian rock singer-songwriter (The Wackers)
- 11
  - Toni Carbone, 62, Italian new wave bassist (Denovo)
  - Sam Cutler, 80, English tour manager (The Rolling Stones, Grateful Dead)
  - Yuzo Toyama, 92, Japanese classical composer
- 12 – André Watts, 77, American classical pianist
- 14 – Anthony Meo, American hardcore punk drummer (Biohazard) (death announced on this date)
- 15 – Chen Mao-shuen, 87, Taiwanese classical composer
- 16 – Jane Birkin, 76, English-French pop singer
- 17
  - DJ Deeon, 56, American house DJ and producer
  - João Donato, 88, Brazilian jazz and bossa nova pianist
  - Walt Groller, 92, American polka accordionist
  - Marc Herrand, 98, French pop and chanson singer (Les Compagnons de la chanson)
- 19 – Mark Thomas, 67, British film composer
- 21
  - Hafiz Abdelrahman, Sudanese traditional and classical flautist
  - Tony Bennett, 96, American pop singer
  - Neal Langford, 50, American indie rock bassist (The Shins) (death announced on this date)
  - Chollathee Tharnthong, 85, Thai luk thung composer and singer
- 22
  - Peter Austin, 78, Jamaican ska singer (The Clarendonians)
  - Vince Hill, 89, English pop singer
  - Knut Riisnæs, 77, Norwegian jazz saxophonist and flautist
- 23 – Raymond Froggatt, 81, English pop singer and songwriter
- 24
  - Leny Andrade, 80, Brazilian jazz singer
  - Brad Houser, 62, American alternative rock bassist (Edie Brickell & New Bohemians, Critters Buggin)
  - Dóris Monteiro, 88, Brazilian pop singer
  - Cecilia Pantoja, 79, Chilean bolero singer-songwriter
- 25 – Andreas Tsoukalas, 60, Greek pop singer-songwriter
- 26
  - Randy Meisner, 77, American country rock singer-songwriter and bassist (Eagles, Poco)
  - Sinéad O'Connor, 56, Irish alternative rock singer-songwriter
  - Surinder Shinda, 70, Indian Punjabi singer
- 27 – Ruth W. Greenfield, 99, American classical pianist
- 28
  - Jim Parker, 88, British classical composer
  - Tommi Stumpff, 65, German EBM singer and multi-instrumentalist
- 29 – Manolo Miralles, 71, Spanish folk singer (Al Tall)
- 31 – Anders Stenmo, 67, Swedish-Austrian pop drummer (Erste Allgemeine Verunsicherung) (death announced on this date)

=== August ===
- 1
  - Alexander Kolker, 90, Russian film composer
  - Dom Minasi, 80, American jazz guitarist
- 3 – Carl Davis, 86, American-born British film composer and conductor
- 4 – John Gosling, 75, British rock keyboardist (The Kinks)
- 5 – Tristan Honsinger, 73, American free jazz cellist
- 6 – David LaFlamme, 82, American psychedelic rock singer and violinist (It's a Beautiful Day)
- 7
  - Gillian Bibby, 77, New Zealand classical composer and pianist
  - DJ Casper, 58, American dance DJ and songwriter
  - Erkin Koray, 82, Turkish Anatolian rock singer-songwriter and guitarist
  - Toussaint McCall, 89, American R&B singer
- 8 – Sixto Rodriguez, 81, American psychedelic folk singer-songwriter
- 9
  - Peppino Gagliardi, 83, Italian pop singer
  - Robbie Robertson, 80, Canadian rock singer-songwriter and guitarist (The Band)
- 10 – Brad Thomson, American mathcore guitarist (The Tony Danza Tapdance Extravaganza) (death announced on this date)
- 11
  - Ron Peno, 68, Australian alternative rock singer-songwriter (Died Pretty)
  - Carlos Camacho, 73, Puerto Rican pop singer (Los Hispanos)
  - Shoji Tabuchi, 79, Japanese-American country fiddler
- 12
  - Vilayil Faseela, 63, Indian Mappila songs singer
  - Berit Lindholm, 88, Swedish opera singer
- 13
  - Clarence Avant, 92, American music executive
  - Magoo, 50, American rapper and songwriter (Timbaland & Magoo)
- 14 – Jessica Cash, 84, British opera singer
- 15 – Arnold Östman, 83, Swedish classical conductor
- 16
  - Jerry Moss, 88, American recording executive
  - Renata Scotto, 89, Italian opera singer
- 17
  - Bobby Eli, 77, American soul and funk guitarist (MFSB), songwriter, and record producer
  - Gary Young, 70, American indie rock drummer (Pavement)
- 18 – Ray Hildebrand, 82, American pop singer-songwriter (Paul & Paula)
- 19
  - Gloria Coates, 89, American-born German classical composer
  - Václav Patejdl, 68, Slovak pop rock singer and keyboardist (Elán)
- 20 – Luc Smets, 76, Belgian rock singer and keyboardist (The Pebbles)
- 21 – Denis LePage, 74, Canadian disco singer-songwriter and keyboardist (Lime)
- 22
  - Toto Cutugno, 80, Italian pop singer-songwriter
  - Vaccine, 43, American dubstep producer
- 23 – Bob Feldman, 83, American pop singer (The Strangeloves), songwriter, and record producer
- 24
  - Bernie Marsden, 72, English hard rock guitarist (Whitesnake) and songwriter
  - Sakevi Yokoyama, Japanese hardcore punk singer (GISM)
- 25 – Carlos Gonzaga, 99, Brazilian rock singer
- 26
  - Bosse Broberg, 85, Swedish jazz trumpeter and composer
  - John Kezdy, 64, American punk singer (The Effigies)
- 27
  - Robert Hale, 90, American opera singer (death announced on this date)
  - Brian McBride, 53, American ambient multi-instrumentalist (Stars of the Lid, Bell Gardens) (death announced on this date)
  - Denyse Plummer, 69, Trinidadian calypso and gospel singer
- 28
  - August 08, 31, American R&B singer-songwriter
  - James Casey, 40, American jam band saxophonist (Trey Anastasio Band)
- 29 – Peter King, 84, Nigerian Afrobeat and jazz multi-instrumentalist
- 30 – Jack Sonni, 68, American rock guitarist (Dire Straits)

=== September ===
- 1
  - Robert Becerra, 64, American punk guitarist (Stains)
  - Jimmy Buffett, 76, American country rock singer-songwriter
  - Milka Stojanović, 86, Serbian opera singer
- 2 – Walter Arlen, 103, Austrian-American classical composer and music critic
- 3 – José Sébéloué, 74, French pop guitarist and singer (La Compagnie Créole)
- 4
  - Teté Caturla, 85, Cuban pop singer (Cuarteto d'Aida)
  - Steve Harwell, 56, American alternative rock singer (Smash Mouth)
  - Sherali Joʻrayev, 76, Uzbek folk singer
  - Tail Dragger Jones, 82, American blues singer
  - Gary Wright, 80, American rock singer-songwriter and keyboardist (Spooky Tooth)
- 5
  - Tom Davies, 48, British-American stoner rock bassist (Nebula)
  - Joe Fagin, 83, British pop singer (death announced on this date)
  - Bruce Guthro, 62, Canadian folk and country singer-songwriter (Runrig)
  - Richard Laviolette, 41, Canadian folk rock singer-songwriter
  - Anatol Ugorski, 80, Russian-born German classical pianist
- 6
  - Larry Chance, 82, American doo-wop singer (The Earls)
  - Richard Davis, 93, American jazz bassist
  - Malini Rajurkar, 82, Indian classical singer
  - Steve Roden, 59, American lowercase composer and synthesizer player
- 7
  - Charles Gayle, 84, American jazz saxophonist and pianist
  - María Jiménez, 73, Spanish bolero and ranchera singer
  - Margherita Rinaldi, 88, Italian opera singer
- 8 – Mylon LeFevre, 78, American Christian rock singer
- 10
  - Evgeny Brazhnik, 78, Russian classical conductor
  - Brendan Croker, 70, English country rock guitarist (The Notting Hillbillies)
  - Charlie Robison, 59, American country singer-songwriter
  - Matthew Stewart, 41, American ska punk trumpeter (Streetlight Manifesto)
- 11 – Dedi Graucher, 62, Israeli religious singer
- 12
  - Beytocan, 67, Turkish-born Swedish Kurdish folk singer
  - MohBad, 27, Nigerian Afrobeats rapper and singer-songwriter
- 13
  - Manik Bhide, 88, Indian Hindustani classical singer
  - Roger Whittaker, 87, British folk singer-songwriter
- 14 – Fred Lewis, 72, American funk percussionist (Lakeside)
- 15
  - Franco Migliacci, 92, Italian pop lyricist
  - Suzanne Sarroca, 96, French opera singer
  - Paul Woseen, 56, Australian hard rock bassist and songwriter (The Screaming Jets)
- 16
  - Nikolai Dobronravov, 94, Russian pop and estrada lyricist
  - Irish Grinstead, 43, American R&B singer (702)
  - Milo Hrnić, 73, Croatian pop singer
  - John Marshall, 82, English jazz fusion and progressive rock drummer (Nucleus, Soft Machine, Centipede)
- 17 – Lies Adji Rachman, 78, Indonesian pop singer (Dara Puspita)
- 19
  - Lou Deprijck, 77, Belgian pop singer-songwriter and record producer
  - Stephen Gould, 61, American opera singer
- 20
  - Katherine Anderson, 79, American R&B singer (The Marvelettes)
  - Yaacov Bergman, 78, Israeli classical conductor
  - Kent Stax, American hardcore punk drummer (Scream)
- 21 – Robert W. Smith, 64, American classical trumpeter and composer
- 22
  - Mike Henderson, 70, American country singer-songwriter and multi-instrumentalist (The SteelDrivers)
  - Peter Horton, 82, Austrian pop guitarist and singer (death announced on this date)
  - Stan Klees, 91, Canadian businessman (RPM) and record executive
  - Alejandro Meerapfel, 54, Argentine opera singer
  - Dieter Schneider, 86, German schlager lyricist
- 23
  - François Glorieux, 91, Belgian classical conductor and composer
  - Terry Kirkman, 83, American sunshine pop singer-songwriter and multi-instrumentalist (The Association)
- 24
  - Felix Ayo, 90, Spanish-born Italian baroque and chamber violinist (I Musici)
  - Barry Olivier, 87, American folk guitarist, guitar teacher and founder of the Berkeley Folk Music Festival
- 25 – David McCallum, 90, Scottish easy listening composer, arranger and multi-instrumentalist
- 27 – Dom Famularo, 70, American jazz drummer
- 28 – Stephen Ackles, 57, Norwegian rock and roll singer and pianist
- 29
  - Jon Fausty, 74, American sound and recording engineer
  - Ron Howden, 78, English progressive rock drummer (Nektar)
- 30
  - Russell Batiste Jr., 57, American funk and jazz fusion drummer (The Meters, Vida Blue, Papa Grows Funk)
  - Russell Sherman, 93, American classical pianist

=== October ===
- 1
  - Julian Bahula, 85, South African jazz drummer (Jabula)
  - Patricia Janečková, 25, Slovak opera singer
  - Joy Webb, 91, British gospel singer (The Joystrings)
  - Ricky Wolff, 78, South African pop singer (White Plains)
- 2
  - Herbert Handt, 97, American opera singer and conductor
  - Lefteris Hapsiadis, 69, Greek laïko and rebetiko lyricist
- 3
  - Jacqueline Dark, 55, Australian opera singer
  - Lena McLin, 95, American classical and religious composer and music teacher
- 5 – Bruno Filippini, 78, Italian pop singer
- 6 – Maurice Bourgue, 83, French classical oboist, composer, and conductor
- 7 – Reiner Goldberg, 83, German opera singer
- 8 – Ritchie Routledge, 73, British rock singer and guitarist (The Cryin' Shames)
- 9
  - Hugh Friel, 71, Irish new wave drummer (The Atrix)
  - Steven Lutvak, 64, American musical theater composer
  - Buck Trent, 85, American country multi-instrumentalist
- 11 – Rudolph Isley, 84, American R&B singer-songwriter (The Isley Brothers)
- 12
  - Michael Cooper, 71, Jamaican reggae keyboardist (Inner Circle, Third World)
  - Aérea Negrot, 43, Venezuelan house DJ and singer (Hercules and Love Affair)
- 13 – Garry Mapanzure, 25, Zimbabwean Afropop singer
- 14 – Gary Nuñez, 71, Puerto Rican plena and bomba bassist (Plena Libre)
- 16 – Gennady Gladkov, 88, Russian film composer
- 17 – Carla Bley, 87, American jazz composer and pianist
- 18 – Dwight Twilley, 72, American power pop singer-songwriter
- 19
  - The 45 King, 62, American hip hop record producer and DJ
  - Lasse Berghagen, 78, Swedish schlager singer
  - Atsushi Sakurai, 57 Japanese alternative rock singer-songwriter (Buck-Tick)
- 22 – Gregg Sutton, 74, American country rock bassist (Lone Justice) and songwriter
- 23
  - Chronis Aidonidis, 95, Greek folk singer
  - Angelo Bruschini, 62, English alternative rock and trip-hop guitarist (The Blue Aeroplanes, Massive Attack)
  - István Láng, 90, Hungarian classical composer
  - Mervin Shiner, 102, American country singer-songwriter and guitarist
- 24
  - Lily Afshar, 63, Iranian classical guitarist
  - Ricardo Iorio, 61, Argentine heavy metal singer and bassist (Almafuerte, Hermética, V8)
  - Steve Riley, 67, American hard rock drummer (Keel, W.A.S.P., L.A. Guns)
- 25 – Zdeněk Mácal, 87, Czech classical conductor
- 26
  - Goa Gil, 72, American psytrance and goa trance DJ
  - Rigo Star, 68, Congolese soukous guitarist and composer
- 27 – Axali Doëseb, 69, Namibian anthem composer
- 29 – Heath, 55, Japanese visual kei bassist (X Japan)

=== November ===
- 1
  - Pierre Dutour, 91, French classical and jazz trumpeter, composer, and conductor
  - Leela Omchery, 94, Indian classical singer and musicologist
  - Vladimir Urbanovich, 85, Russian opera singer
  - Vic Vergeat, 72, Italian rock guitarist and singer-songwriter
- 2
  - Michel Pilz, 78, German jazz clarinetist
  - Evgeniy Shiryaev, 80, Russian classical composer
  - Yuri Temirkanov, 84, Russian classical conductor
- 3 – Pete Garner, 61, British alternative rock bassist (The Stone Roses) (death announced on this date)
- 5
  - Ryland Davies, 80, Welsh opera singer
  - Lolita Rodrigues, 94, Brazilian pop singer
- 6
  - Nadira Begum, Bangladeshi folk singer
  - Sean Martin, 26, English indie pop singer and guitarist (The Night Café) (death announced on this date)
- 7 – C-Knight, 52, American rapper (The Dove Shack)
- 9
  - R.L. Boyce, 68, American blues singer-songwriter and guitarist
  - Junko Ohashi, 73, Japanese pop singer
- 10 – Johnny Ruffo, 35, Australian dance pop singer
- 11
  - Luis Carlos Gil, 72, Spanish pop singer (Trigo Limpio)
  - Conny Van Dyke, 78, American pop singer
  - Angelita Vargas, 77, Spanish flamenco singer
- 12 – Mohammed al Amin, 80, Sudanese folk singer-songwriter and oud player
- 13 – Ivo Kuusk, 86, Estonian opera singer
- 14 – Buzy, 66, French pop singer
- 15
  - P. K. Narayanan Nambiar, 96, Indian traditional mizhavu player
  - Karl Tremblay, 47, Canadian folk singer (Les Cowboys Fringants) (death announced on this date)
- 16
  - George "Funky" Brown, 74, American funk drummer and songwriter (Kool & the Gang)
  - Thành Được, 89, Vietnamese cải lương singer
- 17
  - Christiane Bervoets, 75, Belgian pop singer
  - Seóirse Bodley, 90, Irish classical composer
  - Charlie Dominici, 72, American progressive metal singer (Dream Theater, Dominici) (death announced on this date)
  - Claude Kahn, 88, French classical pianist
- 18 – David Del Tredici, 86, American classical composer
- 19
  - Ninie Doniah, 56, Malagasy salegy singer and composer
  - Catherine Christer Hennix, 75, Swedish minimalist and drone multi-instrumentalist and composer
  - Sara Tavares, 45, Portuguese pop and jazz singer
- 20 – Mars Williams, 68, American new wave and jazz fusion saxophonist (The Waitresses, The Psychedelic Furs, Liquid Soul)
- 21
  - Chad Allan, 80, Canadian rock singer, guitarist and keyboardist (The Guess Who, Brave Belt)
  - Horacio Malvicino, 94, Argentine jazz and tango guitarist and composer
- 22
  - Jean Knight, 80, American soul and funk singer (death announced on this date)
  - Phil Quartararo, 67, American music industry executive
- 24 – Jukka Haavisto, 93, Finnish swing accordionist and vibraphonist
- 25
  - Julio Anderson, 74, Chilean folk rock bassist (Los Jaivas)
  - Les Maguire, 81, English pop rock keyboardist and saxophonist (Gerry and the Pacemakers).
  - Akzhol Meirbekov, 73, Kazakh rock singer (Dos Mukasan)
  - Yngvar Numme, 79, Norwegian pop singer (Dizzie Tunes)
  - B. Sasikumar, 74, Indian carnatic violinist
- 26
  - Brian Godding, 78, Welsh jazz rock guitarist (Blossom Toes, Centipede).
  - Geordie Walker, 64, English post-punk guitarist and songwriter (Killing Joke, The Damage Manual)
- 28
  - Queenzy Cheng, 37, Malaysian pop singer
  - John Colianni, 61, American jazz pianist
- 29 – Scott Kempner, 69, American rock guitarist (The Dictators, The Del-Lords)
- 30 – Shane MacGowan, 65, Irish Celtic punk singer-songwriter (The Pogues).

=== December ===
- 1 – Badar uz Zaman, 83, Pakistani classical singer
- 2 – Medea Amiranashvili, 93, Georgian opera singer.
- 3
  - Thanga Darlong, 103, Indian folk singer
  - Myles Goodwyn, 75, Canadian hard rock singer and guitarist (April Wine)
- 4
  - John Hyatt, British post-punk singer (The Three Johns)
  - Vlado Pravdić, 73, Bosnian hard rock keyboardist (Bijelo Dugme)
- 5
  - Mama Diabaté, 63, Guinean folk singer and multi-instrumentalist
  - Denny Laine, 79, English rock guitarist and songwriter (Wings, The Moody Blues)
- 6 – Michel Sardaby, 88, French jazz pianist
- 7
  - Ramón Ayala, 96, Argentine folk singer-songwriter
  - Terry Baucom, 71, American bluegrass singer and banjoist (Russell Moore and IIIrd Tyme Out)
  - Lola Dee, 95, American pop singer
- 8 – Nidra Beard, 71, American soul and funk singer (Dynasty) (death announced on this date)
- 10 – Cayle Sain, 31, American metal drummer (Twitching Tongues). (death announced on this date)
- 11
  - Jeffrey Foskett, 67, American pop rock singer-songwriter and guitarist (The Beach Boys)
  - Richard Kerr, 78, English singer-songwriter (death announced on this date)
  - Essra Mohawk, 75, American jazz rock singer-songwriter
  - Zahara, 36, South African Afro-soul singer
- 12
  - Roderick McLeod, Australian psychedelic rock singer (The Pineapples from the Dawn of Time)
  - Ole Paus, 76, Norwegian ballad singer-songwriter
- 13 – Travis Dopp, American post-hardcore guitarist (Small Brown Bike)
- 14 – Giorgos Tolios, 58, Greek post-punk drummer (Trypes)
- 15
  - Anup Ghoshal, 78, Indian playback singer and film composer
  - Bob Johnson, 79, British folk rock singer and guitarist (Steeleye Span)
- 16
  - Óscar Agudelo, 91, Colombian bolero singer
  - Colin Burgess, 77, Australian rock drummer (AC/DC, The Masters Apprentices) (death announced on this date)
  - Carlos Lyra, 90, Brazilian bossa nova singer and composer
  - Tim Norell, 68, Swedish pop songwriter (Norell Oson Bard).
- 17
  - Amp Fiddler, 65, American funk singer-songwriter and keyboardist (Enchantment, Parliament, Funkadelic)
  - Jim Ladd, 75, American disc jockey and radio personality (KMET, KLOS, SiriusXM),
  - Mike Maxfield, 79, English pop rock guitarist and songwriter (The Dakotas). (death announced on this date)
- 18
  - Ronnie Caryl, 70, English rock guitarist (Flaming Youth)
  - Susanna Parigi, 62, Italian pop singer-songwriter and pianist
- 19
  - Gunther Emmerlich, 79, German opera singer and jazz banjoist
  - Russell Hunter, 76, British psychedelic rock drummer (Pink Fairies, The Deviants)
  - Bram Inscore, 41, American rock and pop multi-instrumentalist (Electrocute), producer and songwriter
- 20 – Eric Moyo, 41, Zimbabwean gospel singer
- 22
  - Laura Lynch, 65, American country singer and bassist (The Dixie Chicks)
  - Heike Matthiesen, 59, German classical guitarist
- 23
  - Murad Kajlayev, 92, Russian classical composer and conductor
  - Lisandro Meza, 86, Colombian cumbia singer and accordionist
- 24
  - Vasilis Karras, 70, Greek laïko singer
  - Alice Parker, 98, American choral composer and conductor
  - Willie Ruff, 92, American jazz bassist and French hornist
- 25 – Thanh Điền, 56, Vietnamese Đờn ca tài tử guitarist
- 26
  - Tony Oxley, 85, English avant-garde jazz drummer
  - Tom Smothers, 86, American comedy and folk singer and guitarist (Smothers Brothers)
- 27
  - Michael Gibbons Jr, American crossover thrash guitarist (Leeway)
  - Mbongeni Ngema, 68, South African lyricist and composer
- 28
  - Francis Dhomont, 97, French electroacoustic composer
  - Pedro Suárez-Vértiz, 54, Peruvian rock singer-songwriter (Arena Hash)
  - Tommy Talton, 74, American rock guitarist (We the People, Cowboy)
- 29 – Les McCann, 88, American jazz pianist
- 30 – Bhavani Shankar, 66–67, Indian Hindustani classical pakhawaj drummer
- 31
  - Shmulik Bilu, 71, Israeli pop singer (Milk and Honey)
  - O. S. Thyagarajan, 76, Indian Carnatic singer

== Musical films ==
- Wonka

== See also ==
- Timeline of musical events
- Women in music
