= 2023 in African music =

The following is a list of events and releases that happened in 2023 in African music.

== Events ==
- January 11 – It is announced by Nhanhla Sibisi, head of the Recording Industry of South Africa (RiSA) that the 29th edition of the South African Music Awards will begin accepting entries in the first quarter of 2023.
- March – The marriage between Somizi Mhlongo and Mohale Tebogo Motaung end divorce proceedings when it is discovered that they were never legally married.
- June – The Grammy Award for Best African Music Performance, a new award, is announced by the Recording Academy. The inaugural winner, announced at the ceremony in February 2024, is Tyla with the song "Water".
- November 4 – The 19th and final series of Idols South Africa is won by Thabo Ndlovu.

== Albums released in 2023 ==
Release date	Artist	Album	Genre	Label	Ref
January 27	Sjava	Isibuko	Afro-pop	1020 Cartel	
February 17	King Ayisoba	Work Hard	Folk/Electronic	Glitterbeat	
February 17	Spinall	Top Boy	Rap		
February 24	AKA	Mass Country	Hip hop	Sony	
February 24	Kimi Djabaté	Dindin	Various	Cumbancha	
March 31	Davido	Timeless		DMW; Sony	
March 31	Baaba Maal	Being		Palm / Marathon Artists	
May 12	Bokani Dyer	Radio Sechaba	Jazz	Brownswood Recordings	
15 June	Jantra	Synthesised Sudan: Astro-Nubian Electronic Jaglara Dance Sounds from the Fashaga Underground	Jaglara	Ostinato Records	
16 June	Asake	Work of Art	Afrobeats	YBNL Nation and Empire Distribution	
25 August	Burna Boy	I Told Them...	Afrofusion	Atlantic, Spaceship Records, and Bad Habit	
29 September	KMRU	Dissolution Grip	Ambient, drone, experimental	OFNOT	
4 October	Katawa Singers	Digital Indigenous 05	Gospel		
1 December	Brymo	Macabre	Alternative music	Indie	
8 December	Seyi Vibez	NAHAMciaga	Afrobeats		

== Deaths ==
- February 8 – Dennis Lotis, 97, South African-born singer
- February 10 – AKA, 35, South African rapper
- February 25 – Ismaïla Touré, 73, Senegalese musician and co-founder of Touré Kunda
- March 14 – Gloria Bosman, 50, South African jazz singer
- June 9 – Niel Immelman, 78, South African-born classical pianist
- July 21 – Hafiz Abdelrahman, Sudanese flautist (age unknown)
- August 17 – OJ Blaq, 40, Ghanaian rapper and actor
- September 12 – MohBad, 27, Nigerian rapper
- October 1 – Julian Bahula, 85, South African drummer, composer and bandleader.
- October 1 – Garry Mapanzure, 25, Zimbabwean Afropop singer
- October 27 – Axali Doëseb, 69, Namibian composer
- November 12 – Mohammed al Amin, 80, Sudanese popular musician and oud player
- December 11 – Zahara, 36, South African singer-songwriter (liver disease)
- December 20 – Eric Moyo, 41, Zimbabwean singer (brain haemorrhage)
- December 27 – Mbongeni Ngema, 68, South African lyricist and composer (traffic collision)

== See also ==
- 2023 in music
