= Shiryaev =

Shiryaev or Shiryayev (Russian: Ширяев) is a Russian male surname, its feminine counterpart is Shiryaeva. It may refer to

- Albert Shiryaev (born 1934), Russian mathematician
- Alexander Shiryaev
- Boris Shiryaev (1889–1959), was a Russian writer
- Evgeniy Shiryaev
- Maksim Shiryayev (footballer, born 1975), Russian football player
- Maksim Shiryayev (footballer, born 1995), Russian football player
- Sergey Shiryayev (born 1983), Russian cross country skier
- Vyacheslav Shiryayev (born 1973), Russian football player
- Yevhen Shyryayev (born 1984), Ukrainian football goalkeeper
- Alexandra Shiryayeva (born 1983), Russian beach volleyball player
