= Pierre Fageolle =

French journalist and songwriter

Pierre Fageolle is a French journalist and songwriter. Internationally he is perhaps most well known for writing the book Cosmos 1999: L'épopée de la blancheur (DLM Editions, Paris: 1996), a highly acclaimed socio-cultural analysis of Gerry Anderson's TV-series Space: 1999.

He also co-wrote biographies of French singers Marie Laforêt (...car rien n'a d'importance Editions, 1994) and Etienne Daho (Hors Collection Editions, 1999). As a songwriter, he worked for French rocker Buzy and Algerian musician Akim El Sikameya – amongst others.

He has formed a music trio called Peppermoon which has toured Europe and Asia. He is the songwriter and keyboard player.

== Cosmos 1999: L'épopée de la blancheur ==
Fageolle's analysis of Space: 1999 has been positively compared and contrasted with similar books, like Exploring Space: 1999 by John Kenneth Muir, and is often considered to be the deepest analysis of the series published so far. The main focus of his analysis is on the symbolism of the series as a whole, seeing the main trio of writers as representing different interpretations of the world. In the writings of Johnny Byrne he sees a Catholic interpretation of the world, in Christopher Penfold he sees a Protestant worldview, and in Edward di Lorenzo he identifies a secular worldview based on psycho-analysis. He also makes important contributions to the interpretation of individual episodes by comparing the writing with French nouveau roman author Michel Butor, and otherwise he makes use of the psycho-analysis of Bruno Bettelheim for adding insights on subtext. Fageolle's interpretation of the visual aspects of the series, and how the visuals interplay with the music, is based on Wassily Kandinsky's philosophy of the spiritual in art.
