= 0151 =

0151 may refer to:

- The telephone dialling code for the city of Liverpool
- 0151 (album), the debut album of Liverpool band The Night Café
