= Lamar Crowson =

American concert pianist and a chamber musician

John Lamar Crowson (May 27, 1926 – August 25, 1998) was an American concert pianist and a chamber musician.

Crowson was born in Tampa, Florida. His early education was in Portland, Oregon, with noted pedagogue Nellie Tholen, where he attended Reed College (1943–1948), majoring in art, history and literature. He later studied piano under Arthur Benjamin, who invited him to study at the Royal College of Music in 1948 and was appointed to the staff in 1957. During the 1950s he won many major prizes, including the Chappell Gold Medal, the Dannreuther Prize and the Harriet Cohen International Medal. In 1952 he was laureate in the Queen Elisabeth Competition in Brussels. This initiated his career as a concert pianist performing with such notable conductors as Sir John Barbirolli, Daniel Barenboim, Pierre Boulez, Sir Adrian Boult, Sir Colin Davis and Pierre Monteux among others.

Crowson was pianist for the Melos Ensemble for many years. Emanuel Hurwitz, leader of the Ensemble, said, "When you walk on to a platform with someone of his artistic integrity, you feel nothing but total confidence". His recordings with the Melos Ensemble include the Beethoven as well as the Mozart quintets for piano and wind, Johann Nepomuk Hummel's quintet and septet, Leoš Janáček's Concertino, which earned the Edison Award and Schubert's "Trout" Quintet. The New York Times praised his recording of the Fauré Piano Quartet with the Pro Arte Quartet. He played and recorded with the Pro Arte Piano Quartet, Kenneth Sillito (violin), Cecil Aronowitz (viola) and Terence Weil (cello). He also recorded on 2 LPs a few of the most important sonatas for the piano by Muzio Clementi (Editions de L'Oiseau Lyre SOL 306 and 307).

Some of the other major artists with whom he worked were Janet Baker, Itzhak Perlman, Uto Ughi, Harald Strebel and Jacqueline du Pré. He introduced the European premières of Poulenc's Sonata for clarinet and piano and Copland's Fantasy. Crowson also gave the first performance of Peter Racine Fricker's Twelve Studies, in Cheltenham in 1961 and the composer dedicated the work to him. In 1981 Alfred Brendel wrote that Crowson was "one of the finest chamber music pianists of our day".

In 1963 Crowson travelled to Cape Town as an examiner for the Associated Board of the Royal Schools of Music and lectured at the South African College of Music at the University of Cape Town from 1965 to 1968. In 1972 he settled in South Africa permanently where he became a leading concert performer and contributed greatly to the musical life of the country while retaining his international links. He was appointed a music professor at UCT in 1980 from which he received an honorary doctorate in 1996. He also taught at the Britten-Pears Academy, Dartington, the University of Queensland, James Cook University in Townsville and elsewhere. He was also one of the most celebrated pianists in the early years of the Australian Festival of Chamber Music, also held in Townsville, Australia.

Some of Crowson's students included Clifford Benson, Ian Brown of the Nash Ensemble, Niel Immelman, Jan Latham-Koenig, Gwenneth Pryor, Roucher du Toit, Melanie Horne, Steven De Groote and Ryan Daniel. Of his students he wrote, "Records get deleted; critiques crumble; but good students, like children and grandchildren, perpetuate".

Crowson was married three times and had two sons by his first marriage, John and Paul. He died in Johannesburg, South Africa, aged 72.

In his obituary the New York Times wrote, "... though little known in the United States, [he] was regarded by many colleagues as one of the finest chamber musicians of his time."
