= Alice Stuart =

American musician

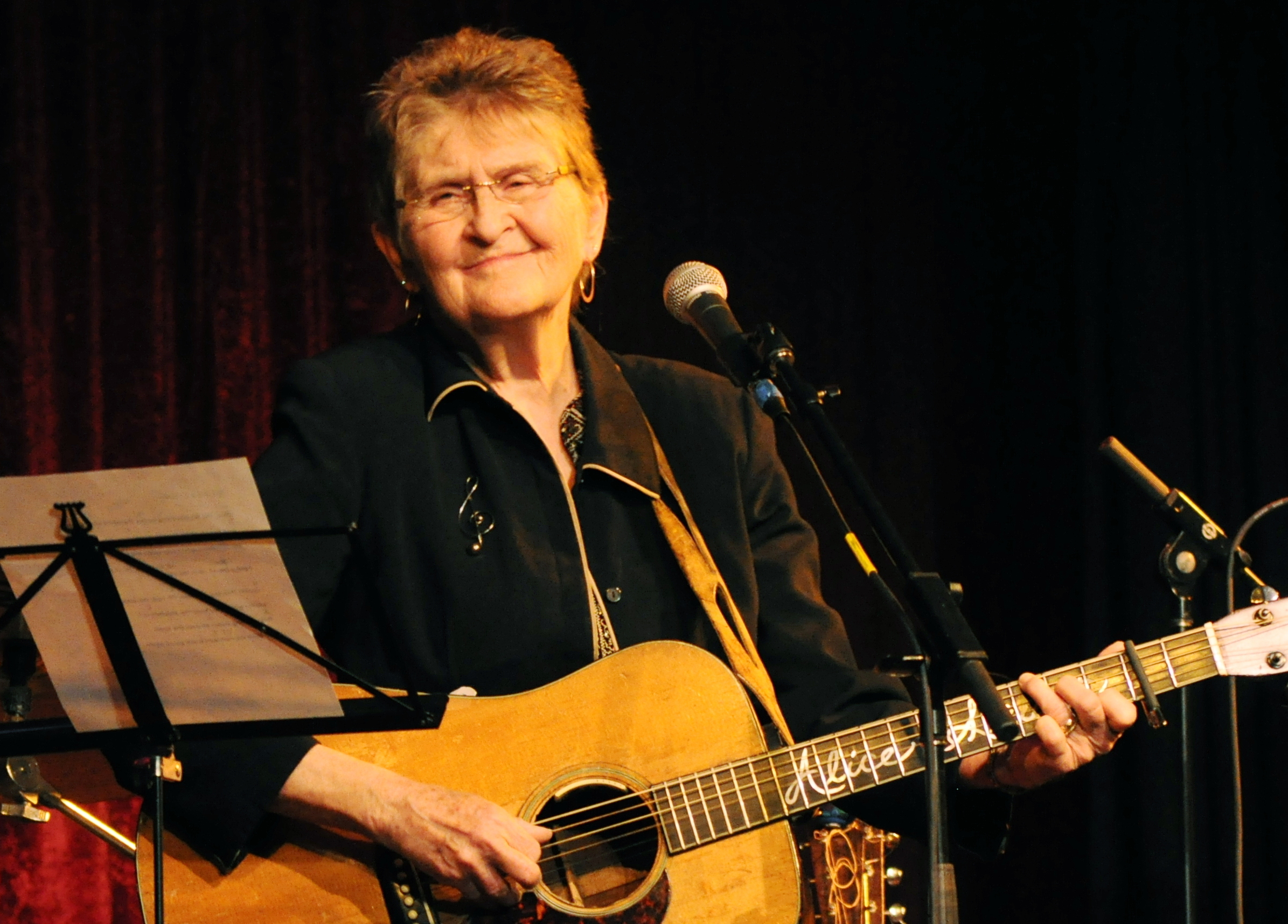
- Alice Stuart, 2011

Background information
- Born: June 15, 1942; Chelan, Washington, U.S.
- Died: July 31, 2023 (aged 81)
- Occupations: Singer-songwriter; guitarist
- Instruments: Vocals; guitar

Alice Stuart (June 15, 1942 – July 31, 2023) was an American blues and folk singer-songwriter and guitarist. She toured the UK with Van Morrison and throughout the United States with Mississippi John Hurt.

Her singing, songwriting, and guitar playing secured her invitations to tour nationally and internationally with Ramblin' Jack Elliott, Doc Watson, Jerry Ricks, Phil Ochs, and Joan Baez, in addition to television appearances on The Dick Cavett Show and the Old Grey Whistle Test. In addition, Stuart's songs have been recorded by Kate Wolf, Irma Thomas, and Jackie DeShannon.

== Biography ==
She was born in Chelan, Washington, United States. Stuart started taking piano lessons at the age of five. She picked up the guitar at age 18 and also played banjo, auto harp, parade snare drum, and bass.

Stuart's early influences as a musician came from classical music, country artists of the 1940s and 1950s such as Hank Snow, Hank Williams, Buddy Holly, Elvis Presley, Roy Orbison, the Everly Brothers and Ivory Joe Hunter, as well as records from the 1920s and 1930s from Blind Willie McTell, Bessie Smith, Rabbit Brown and artist Bob Dylan.

At the age of 22, Stuart played the Berkeley Folk Festival in 1964. She was then invited back by creator/producer Barry Olivier to perform in 1966, and 1970. It was there that she formed a friendship with Mississippi John Hurt, which led to the two touring together.

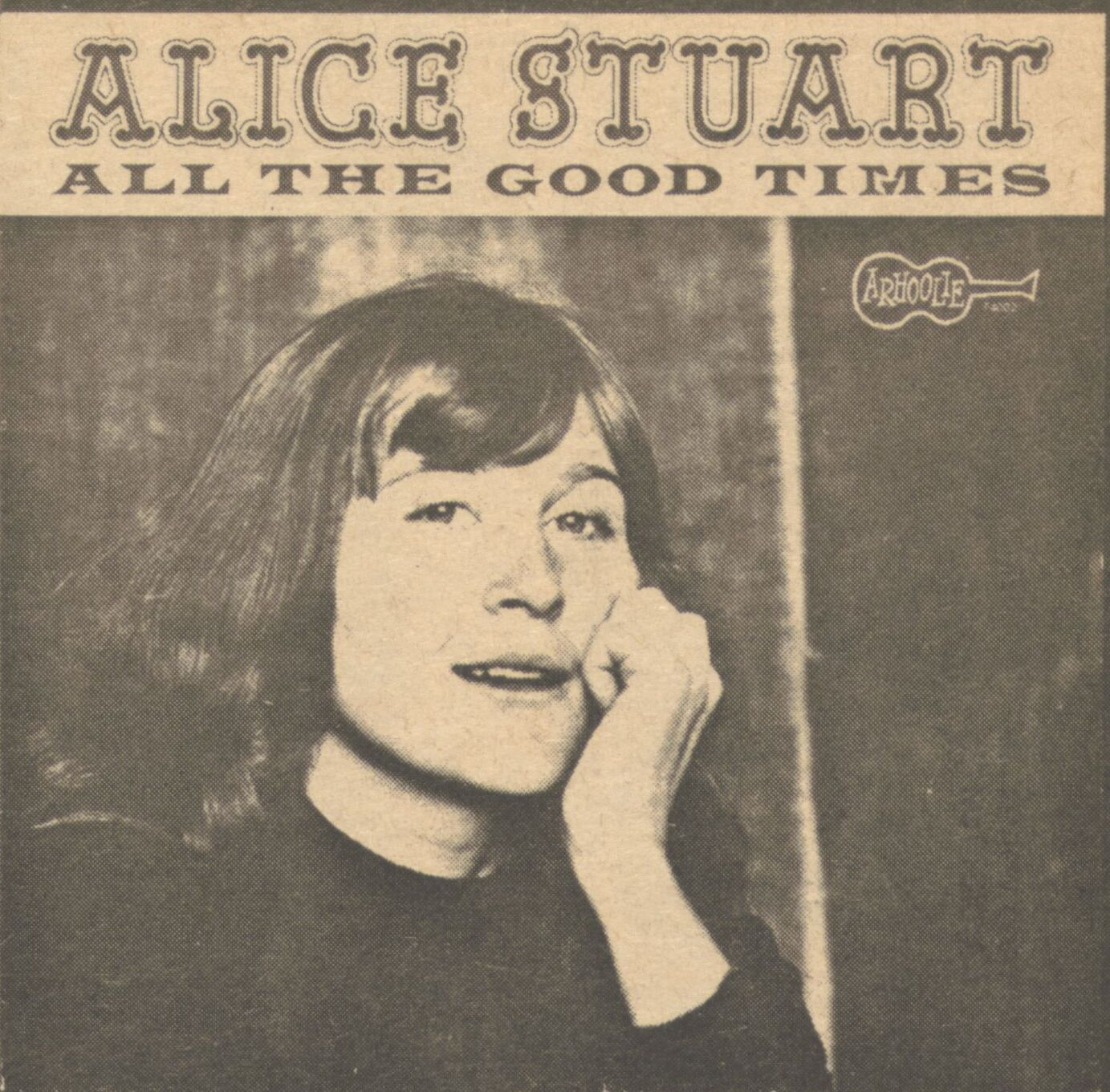
Stuart's first album, All the Good Times, 1964.

Billboard magazine reviewed her debut release in 1964 with: "A beautiful new female voice is now on the folk horizon. Its owner's name is Alice Stuart. She sings with a clean freshness that is exciting in its simplicity. A folk find!"

Alice met Frank Zappa by chance in a Santa Monica, California coffeehouse, as they both were waiting to meet guitarist Steve Mann. She became a member of Zappa's band, the Mothers of Invention, which at the time played mostly blues. Zappa said he wanted to combine certain modal influences into a basically country blues sound. Alice's time the Mothers lasted only a few weeks in October 1965. She left before their debut album Freak Out!, and did not make any recordings with the group. In 1968 Zappa sarcastically said he fired Alice from the band because she could not play "Louie Louie". However, at the same he also said "she played guitar very well and sang well." Alice also said that she chose to leave Frank after an intense but brief romantic relationship.

On November 28, 1971, Stuart appeared on BBC Television's Old Grey Whistle Test, a television program that aired in Europe. In addition to Stuart, a group named Redwing appeared, which among others, featured Timothy B. Schmit (later of the Eagles). Stuart and Redwing were both on the Fantasy label.

In 1972, Stuart sang the title theme song to the X-rated cartoon movie Fritz the Cat, with music done by Ed Bogas.

"Beautiful melodies and clean, countryish, somewhat static postfolk arrangements transform these lyrics into memorable statements of feeling and principle. A bit male-identified, I admit, but the salutory synthesis of small voice and independent spirit proves that a woman doesn't have to be macho to be autonomous. Now who'll prove it for men?"

— Review of Full Time Woman in Christgau's Record Guide: Rock Albums of the Seventies (1981)

On January 2, 1973, Stuart appeared on The Dick Cavett Show, hosted at the time by George Carlin. Other guests on the show included Shelley Winters and Jimmy Breslin. During this time, she also performed with Rosalie Sorrels, Jack Elliott, Doc Watson, Jerry Ricks, Phil Ochs, and Joan Baez.

In 1974, Alice sat in with Fantasy Records label-mates, Jerry Garcia and Merl Saunders, several times, including at The Lion's Share in San Anselmo, California.

Guitar Player magazine featured an article on Stuart in 1974, titled, "Well, so much for 'Mary Hamilton'". Rolling Stone profiled Stuart in 1975 in a feature, "Guitars of the Stars", where she was mentioned alongside Chet Atkins, Mike Bloomfield, David Bromberg, Jose Feliciano, Bonnie Raitt, and Doc Watson.

In the autumn 2006, Stuart contributed her song "Highway" to the album project Artists for Charity – Guitarists 4 the Kids, produced by Slang Productions, to assist World Vision Canada in helping underprivileged kids in need.

Stuart was inducted in Washington Blues Society Hall of Fame and in 2008 she represented the Cascade Blues Association of Portland in the International Blues Challenge.

She lived in the Seattle area and toured with her band, the Formerlys, which consists of Marc Willett, who was in the Kingsmen from 1984 to 1992, and Steven Flynn, formerly of Chuck Berry's band and Jr. Cadillac.

Stuart had a stroke in August 2013. She died in 2023, aged 81.

== Discography ==
=== Solo albums ===
- 1964: All the Good Times (Arhoolie)
- 1970: Full Time Woman (Fantasy / America Records)
- 1972: Believing (Fantasy)
- 2000: Crazy with the Blues (Country con Fusion)
- 2002: Can't Find No Heaven – (Burnside Distribution)
- 2006: Live at the Triple Door (Country con Fusion)
- 2007: Freedom (Country con Fusion)

=== Singles ===
- 1970: "Freedom's the Sound" / "Full Time Woman" (America Records)
- 1973: "Believe In Someone" / "Golden Rocket" (Fantasy)

=== As composer ===
- 1971: Grootna – Grootna (Columbia) – track 6, "Full Time Woman"
- 1972: Jackie DeShannon – Jackie (Atlantic) – track 6, "Full Time Woman"
- 1975: Doris Duke – Woman (Scepter) – track 9, "Full Time Woman"
- 1976: Jimmy Rabbitt And Renegade – Jimmy Rabbitt And Renegade (Capitol) – track 8, "I Lose Control"

== Other sources ==
- Flatpicking Guitar magazine cover story, March/April 2008
- Music legend can still rock in concert (King County Journal, Bellevue, WA, May 2006)
- Blues veteran brings wealth of experience (Hobart Mercury, Australia, January 2004)
- Relix magazine, February 2003
- Dirty Linen, February 2003
- Acoustic Guitar magazine, February 2003
- Blues guitarist Alice Stuart to play in Salem (Statesman Journal, June 2002)
- Alice Stuart is back for more blues (The Record, New Jersey, April 2001)
- The Mediocrity Predicament: Alice Stuart and Snake, Oakland Tribune, March 1974)
- The Daily Review, April 1975
- Rolling Stone CD review, 1971
- Billboard CD review, 1964
