= Dissolution Grip =

Studio album by KMRU
- Released: September 29, 2023
- Genre: Ambient; drone; experimental
- Length: 28:38
- Label: OFNOT

KMRU chronology
Glim (2023)	Dissolution Grip (2023)	Stupor (2023)

Dissolution Grip is the fourteenth studio album by ambient musician Joseph Kamaru, known as KMRU. It was released on September 29, 2023, via OFNOT. To create the album's sounds, Kamaru looked at the waveforms of field recordings, creating synthesizer sounds from the visuals. Dissolution Grip is an ambient, drone, and experimental album, consisting of two long-form tracks. The album received positive reviews from Loud and Quiet, Resident Advisor, and Pitchfork.

== Background, recording and release ==
Joseph Kamaru, better known as KMRU, is an ambient musician from Nairobi, Kenya, who later relocated to Berlin, Germany. His grandfather, also named Joseph Kamaru, was a well-known benga musician. The younger Kamaru is known for being prolific and working with field recordings. He has been described as a "widely referenced figure in contemporary electronic music".

The sounds of Dissolution Grip began as field recordings. During the recording process, Kamaru looked at the waveforms of the recordings and wrote "scores from the shapes, gradually turning the scores into raw synth sounds". Kamaru had developed this technique during his studies at the Berlin University of the Arts. The bonus track "Along a Wall" was recorded at a shack in Kamaru's estate in Nairobi, Kenya, while it was being struck by strong winds. The album was released on September 29, 2023, via Kamaru's then-newly created label, OFNOT.

== Music ==
Dissolution Grip is an ambient, drone, and experimental album. It consists of two long-form pieces, and the digital bonus track "Along a Wall". Critics noted the influence from Kamaru's past work with field recordings. The album's sound is distinct from typical ambient works through its distorted textures.

The opening track "Till Hurricane Bisect" runs for fifteen minutes and is titled after an Emily Dickinson poem. It uses layers of relaxed synthesizers which slowly distort into a "shoegaze-y wall of sound". The track ends suddenly. The thirteen-minute title track uses "rippling waves" of ambient synthesizers, which gradually build in intensity. Eli Schoop of Bandcamp Daily identified Tim Hecker's Konoyo (2018) as an influence to the song's mood. The track climaxes with a noise ending. On, "Along a Wall", Kamaru electronically manipulates recordings of wind shaking his building.

== Critical reception ==
Professional ratings
Review scores
Source	Rating
Loud and Quiet	8 / 10
Pitchfork	7.2 / 10

The album received positive reviews from Loud and Quiet, Resident Advisor, and Pitchfork. Jake Crossland of Loud and Quiet rated the album eight out of ten points. He described the album as "absorbing" and "comforting". Zoë Beery, writing for Resident Advisor, praised KMRU's sonic evolution and use of texture. Marc Weidenbaum of Pitchfork rated the album 7.2 out of 10, and discussed Kamaru's sound shift from field recordings.

== Track listing ==
Dissolution Grip

1. "Till Hurricane Bisect" – 15:05
2. "Dissolution Grip" – 13:33

Dissolution Grip (Digital Edition)

1. "Till Hurricane Bisect" – 15:05
2. "Dissolution Grip" – 13:33
3. "Along a Wall" (Digital Bonus) – 12:22

== Personnel ==
Adapted from the album's liner notes.

- Joseph "KMRU" Kamaru – writing, production, artwork
- Stephan Mathieu – mastering
- Joe Gilmore – layout, design
- John Twells – text
