= 2023 in electronic music =

This is a timeline documenting events of Electronic Music in the year 2023.

== Events ==
=== August ===
- August 22 - 8 Bar - The Evolution, A 2021 documentary about the history of grime is released on streaming

== Albums ==
Month	Day	Album	Artist	Label	Genre	Ref.
February	3	Workshop 32	Kassem Mosse	Workshop	Tech house; Minimal techno	
February	3	A Model Within	Satin Doll	Superpang	Experimental Music; Musique concrète	
March	31	绿帽 Green Hat	Tzusing	Pan	Industrial techno	
April	7	No Highs	Tim Hecker	Kranky	Electroacoustic; Ambient	
April	7	Crystal Vision	Nathan Fake	Cambria Instruments	Tech House; Wonky	
April	7	KAL (Real World)	Sarathy Korwar	The Leaf Label	Nu jazz	
May	26	brain scratch	Galen Tipton	Self released	Sound collage; Hyperpop; Ambient	
July	21	Water Flash	Yetsuby	Third Place		

== All critically reviewed albums ranked ==
=== Metacritic ===
Number	Artist	Album	Average score	Number of reviews	Reference
1	Yaeji	With a Hammer	86	13 reviews	
2	James Holden	Imagine This Is a High Dimensional Space of All Possibilities	86	11 reviews	
3	Loscil	Colours of Air	86	6 reviews	
4	Faten Kanaan	Afterpoem	86	4 reviews	
5	Eluvium	(Whirring Marvels In) Consensus Reality	84	4 reviews	

=== AnyDecentMusic ===
Number	Artist	Album	Average score	Number of reviews	Reference

== See also ==
- List of 2023 albums
- 2023 in music
