= KMRU =

Kenyan ambient musician

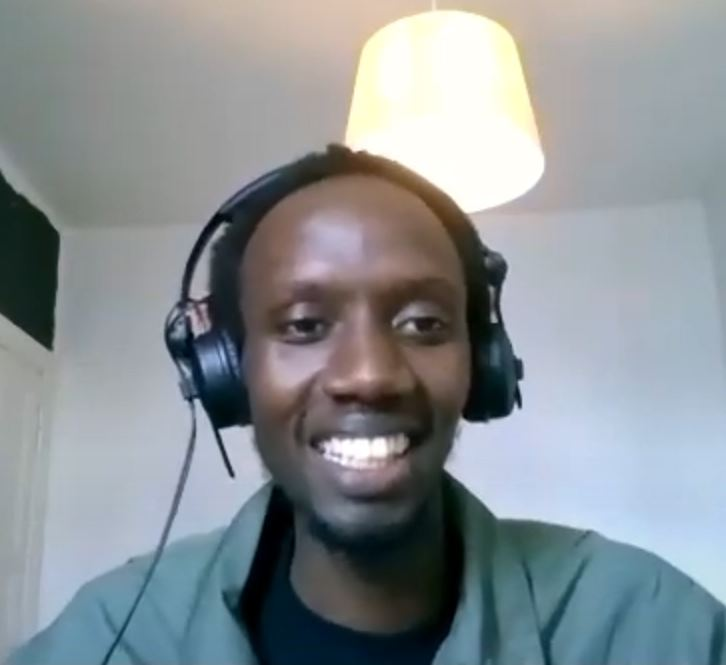
- Kamaru in August 2021

Background information
- Born: Joseph Kamaru; Nairobi, Kenya
- Genres: ambient
- Website: kmru.info

Joseph Kamaru, better known as KMRU, is an ambient musician. He was born in Nairobi, Kenya, and later relocated to Berlin, Germany.

== Musical career ==
As a child, Kamaru played the guitar and sang in a choir. He first discovered electronic music in high school, after finding a copy of FL Studio on the school's computers.

Kamaru is known for being prolific; he published almost twenty releases on Bandcamp between 2017 and 2021.

Kamaru was part of an Ableton Live ad in 2019, in which he recorded field recordings from a broken piano. His 2019 extended play Erased used piano, field recordings, and synthesized drums. In 2020, Kamaru released the albums Saal, Peel, Opaquer and Jar. Released on Editions Mego, Peel was created in 48 hours and blended organic and synthetic textures. In 2022, Kamaru toured with Big Thief. The same year, he released a collaborative album, Limen, with Aho Ssan. In 2023, Pitchfork described Kamaru as a "widely referenced figure in contemporary electronic music".

In 2023, he released Dissolution Grip, which represented a sonic shift away from field recordings. The album received critical acclaim from the publications Loud and Quiet and Pitchfork.

== Personal life ==
His grandfather, also named Joseph Kamaru, was a well-known benga musician. After his death in 2018, the younger Kamaru reissued some of his albums, attempting to introduce a new audience to his music.

Kamaru was born in Nairobi, Kenya. He later moved to Berlin, Germany, in October 2020. He moved to begin attending Universität der Künste for a Master's program of Sound Studies and Sonic Arts.

== Discography ==
=== Albums ===
- Euphoria (2017)
- Variations [Installation] (2019)
- Saal (2020)
- Variations [Radiophonic] (2020)
- Peel (2020)
- Jar (2020)
- Logue (2021)
- Temporary Stored (2022)
- Don't Linger They Might See You (2022)
- Epoch (2022)
- Glim (2023)
- Dissolution Grip (2023)
- Stupor (2023)
- Natur (2024)
- Kin (2026)

=== Collaboration albums ===
- Peripheral with Echium (2021)
- Limen with Aho Ssan (2022)
- Disconnect with Kevin Richard Martin (stylized as KRM:KMRU; 2024)

=== EPs ===
- Noize (2017)
- Erased (2019)
- OT (2019)
- Luft (2020)
- Continual (2020)
- Odra (2020)
- Drawing Water (2020)
- Ftpim (2020)
- Inter Alia (2021)
- As It Still Is (2021)
- There Was Nothing in Between (2022)
- Imperceptible Perceptible (2022)
- Windbags/Lune (2024)
