= Jackie (Jackie DeShannon album) =

Studio album by Jackie DeShannon
- Released: 1972
- Studio: American (Memphis, Tennessee); Atlantic (New York City); Dynamic Sounds (Kingston, Jamaica); Phillips Recording (Memphis, Tennessee)
- Genre: Southern soul; R&B; adult contemporary folk; pop
- Label: Atlantic
- Producer: Jerry Wexler; Arif Mardin; Tom Dowd

Jackie DeShannon chronology
Songs (1971)	Jackie (1972)	Your Baby Is a Lady (1974)

Jackie is an album by American pop singer and songwriter Jackie DeShannon, released in 1972 by Atlantic Records. It was recorded in Memphis with producers Jerry Wexler, Tom Dowd and Arif Mardin.

The album was not commercially successful, charting for two weeks on the Billboard Top LPs with a peak position of 196, but critics have generally appraised it favorably. In 2003, it was reissued under the title Jackie...Plus, featuring 10 additional songs previously unavailable on any album.

== Critical reception ==
Professional ratings
Review scores
Source	Rating
AllMusic	4/5 stars
Christgau's Record Guide	B
Creem	B+
The Encyclopedia of Popular Music	2/5 stars
Herald & Review	10/10
The Rolling Stone Album Guide	2.5/5 stars

Jackie was met with positive reviews. Writing for Rolling Stone in August 1972, Stephen Holden said, "I've always liked Jackie DeShannon's singing — a gently throat-catching but never maudlin style — though on record after record her talent seemed too often to be thrown away on inferior songs with shlock arrangements. Now for the first time the full range of her abilities is shown to maximum effect … what is so satisfying about her singing is the tension she accumulates by always just holding back the full wallop."

Reviewing for Creem in October 1972, Robert Christgau credited Wexler for performing another "conversion job on a soulful white female pop singer", similar what he had done for Dusty Springfield on her 1969 album Dusty in Memphis. "Despite a couple of humdrum country soul songs on the first side", Christgau highlighted DeShannon's original compositions – "Vanilla O'Lay" and "Anna Karina" – as well as her cover of the 1971 Alice Stuart song "Full Time Woman". He later tempered his enthusiasm for the record, however, writing in Christgau's Record Guide: Rock Albums of the Seventies (1981) that Wexler's attempt at modernizing DeShannon nearly succeeded. While finding the fashionable cover songs relatively inessential, he believed DeShannon was compelled to sing better on the more rhythmic productions and that her own written songs remain the LP's essential performances.

AllMusic's Joe Viglione later said Jackie generally plays in the "adult contemporary folk" genre and, while Wexler, Mardin, and Dowd keep DeShannon in a relatively restrained musical space, "her voice is in great shape, and the music is created with loving care, making for a satisfying chapter in the singer's impressive body of work." Herald & Review entertainment editor Tim Cain deemed the record "perfect" and argued that DeShannon has been "tragically underrated". In 2019, it was included in Rolling Stone's list of "20 R&B Albums Rolling Stone Loved in the 1970s You Never Heard". In an accompanying essay, Gavin Edwards said Atlantic's repeated attempt to "take an accomplished pop chanteuse and let her make a lush Southern soul album" may not have had the commercial impact of Dusty in Memphis, "but it was almost as stunning."

== Track listing ==
1. "Paradise" (John Prine)
2. "Heavy Burdens Me Down" (John Hurley, Ronnie Wilkins)
3. "Brand New Start" (John Blakely, Tom Donahue)
4. "Only Love Can Break Your Heart" (Neil Young)
5. "Laid Back Days" (Jackie DeShannon)
6. "Full Time Woman" (Alice Stuart)
7. "Vanilla 'Olay" (DeShannon)
8. "Would You Like to Learn to Dance?" (Steve Goodman)
9. "I Won't Try to Put Chains on Your Soul" (Mary Unobsky, Donna Weiss)
10. "I Wanna Roo You" (Van Morrison)
11. "Peaceful in My Soul" (DeShannon)
12. "Anna Karina" (DeShannon)

== Personnel ==
- Jackie DeShannon - lead vocals, acoustic guitar
- Reggie Young - lead guitar
- Johnny Christopher - rhythm guitar
- Mike Leech - bass
- Bobby Wood - piano, electric piano
- Bobby Emmons - organ
- Haywood Bishop - drums, percussion
- Denzil Laing - percussion
- John Stewart - xylophone
- Charles Chalmers, Cissy Houston, Deidre Tuck, Donna Rhodes, Renelle Stafford, Sandra Rhodes - backing vocals
- Arif Mardin - accordion on "Only Love Can Break Your Heart"
- Albhy Galuten - harpsichord on "Would You Like to Learn to Dance?"
- Larry McDonald - congas
- BWIA Sunjets Steel Orchestra of Trinidad - steel drums on "Vanilla O'Lay" and "I Wanna Roo You"

== Charts ==
Chart (1972)	Peak position
US Billboard Top LPs & Tape	196
