= Thanh Điền =

- Ward
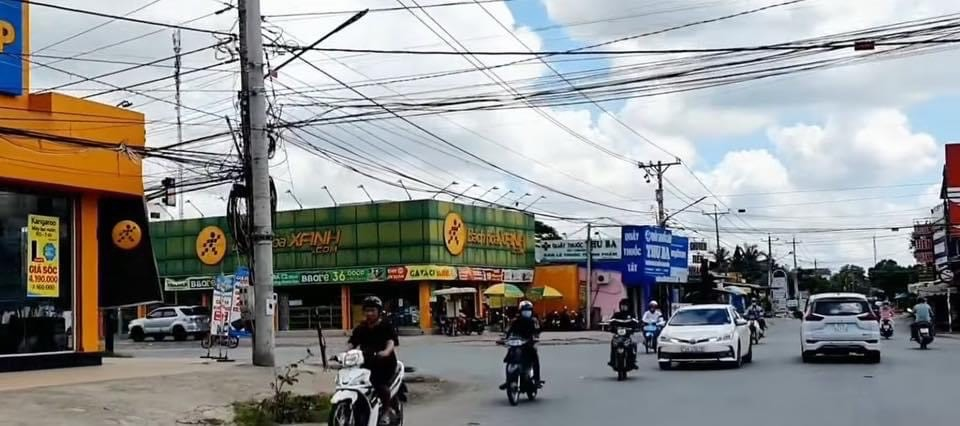
- Thanh Điền intersection
- Interactive map of Thanh Điền
- Coordinates: 11.291005098475393°N 106.11292388948075°E
- Country: Vietnam
- Province: Tây Ninh
- Region: Southeast
- Established: 2025
- Seat: 18 Đường số 6 Phạm Văn Đồng, Khu phố Hiệp Hòa

Area
  - Total: 30.73 km^{2} (11.86 sq mi)

Population (31 December 2024)
  - Total: 43,528
  - Density: 1,416/km^{2} (3,670/sq mi)
- Website: thanhdien.tayninh.gov.vn

Thanh Điền is a ward in Tây Ninh province, Vietnam.

On 16 June 2025, the Standing Committee of the National Assembly of Vietnam adopted Resolution No. 1682/NQ-UBTVQH15 on the reorganization of commune-level administrative units in Tây Ninh province in 2025. Under the resolution, the entire area and population of Hiệp Tân ward in Hòa Thành town and Thanh Điền commune in the former Châu Thành district were consolidated to form a new ward named Thanh Điền.
