= Nick Todd =

American singer (1935–2023)

- Birth name: Cecil Altman Boone
- Born: June 1, 1935; Jacksonville, Florida, U.S.
- Died: January 20, 2023 (aged 87)
- Occupation: Pop singer

Cecil Altman Boone (June 1, 1935 – January 20, 2023), known as Nick Todd, was an American pop singer. He had two hit records called "Plaything" and "At The Hop", which reached No. 41 and No. 21, respectively, on the Billboard Hot 100 chart. "Plaything" debuted in October 1957 and "At The Hop" debuted in December 1957, the same month Danny & the Juniors' version reached No. 1 on the chart.

The president of Dot Records, Randy Wood, did not want him using the same last name as his brother, so he made up "Todd", which is basically "Dot" (Records) spelled backwards. Both recordings were backed by Billy Vaughn and his Orchestra.

Nick Todd earned a master's degree in social work from the University of Tennessee and during the 1970s was executive director of West Tennessee AGAPE, a family service organization. He later moved to Nashville, Tennessee, where he continued work as a social worker, song leader among the churches of Christ, and instructor in Social Work at David Lipscomb University.

== Personal life and death ==
Nick Todd was born in Jacksonville, Florida, and was the younger brother of pop singer Pat Boone who was born a year earlier to the date.

Todd died on January 20, 2023, at the age of 87.
