= Vyacheslav Shiryayev =

Russian footballer

Personal information
- Full name: Vyacheslav Vladimirovich Shiryayev
- Date of birth: 7 November 1973 (age 52)
- Place of birth: Kamyshin, Russian SFSR
- Height: 1.70 m (5 ft 7 in)
- Positions: Forward; midfielder

Youth career
- SDYuSShOR-2 Kamyshin

Senior career*
Years	Team	Apps	(Gls)
1991–1994	FC Avangard Kamyshin	111	(21)
1995	FC Tekstilshchik Kamyshin	4	(0)
1996	FC Avangard Kamyshin (amateur)		
1997	FC Spartak-Bratskiy Yuzhny	7	(1)
1999	FC Tekstilshchik Kamyshin (amateur)		
2000	FC Torpedo-Viktoriya Nizhny Novgorod	7	(0)
2000	FC Khopyor Balashov	1	(0)
2001	FC Tekstilshchik Kamyshin (amateur)		
- * Club domestic league appearances and goals

Vyacheslav Vladimirovich Shiryayev (Russian: Вячеслав Владимирович Ширяев; born 7 November 1973 in Kamyshin) is a former Russian football player.

Shiryayev played in the Russian Premier League with FC Tekstilshchik Kamyshin.
