= The Night Café (band) =

British indie pop band

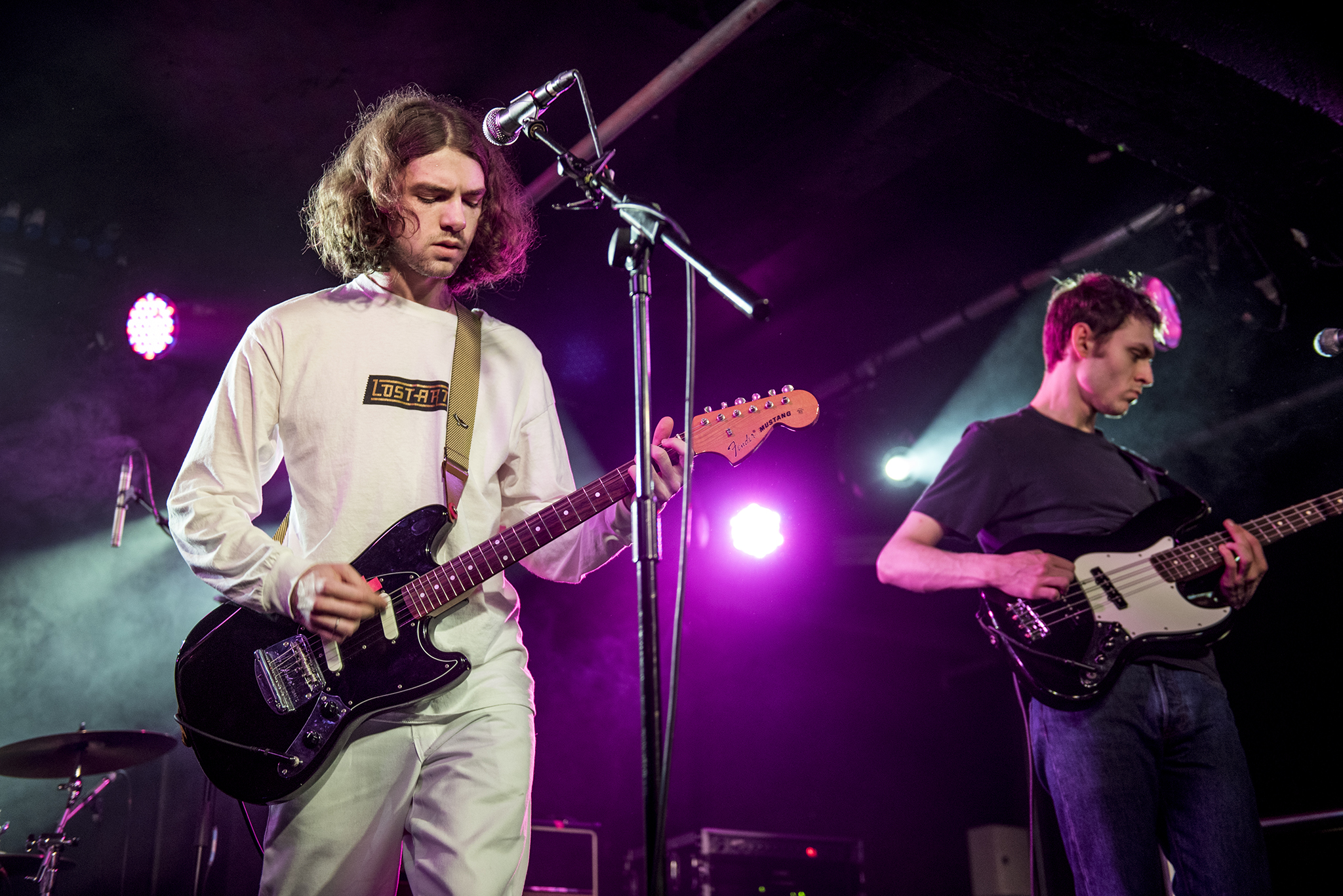
- The Night Café performing in Manchester in 2018

Background information
- Origin: Liverpool, England
- Genres: Indie pop
- Years active: 2014–2023
- Labels: AWAL
- Past members: Sean Martin; Josh Higgins; Arran O'Connell-Whittle; Carl Dillon
- Website: thenight.cafe

The Night Café was a British indie pop band, formed in Liverpool in 2014 by Sean Martin (vocals/guitar), Josh Higgins (guitar), Arran O'Connell-Whittle (bass) and Carl Dillon (drums). Up until their disbandment, the band released three EPs: Get Away from the Feeling (2017), Bunkbed (2018) and For Better Days (2021), and the studio album 0151 (2019).

== History ==
The band's name comes from the Vincent van Gogh painting of the same name (originally known as Le Café de nuit). The band formed in 2014 while the members were still in secondary school, and bonded over mutual musical interests such as Title Fight and Kings Of Leon.

The quartet recorded their first singles, "Growing Up" and "Addicted", at the Whitewood Recording Studio in Liverpool, which were both produced by Robert Whiteley. The band released their debut EP, Get Away From The Feeling, in 2017, which was followed by opening for the band Sundara Karma during the summer 2017. The following year, the band released Bunkbed, their second EP.

On 8 May 2019, the band announced their debut studio album, 0151, which was released on 23 August 2019.

On 22 April 2021, the band released their final EP For Better Days. Martin described the EP's title as "what it says on the tin", mentioning "this last year has been a tough one so we were making rammers to cheer us up to be hopeful for the better days to come".

=== Death of Sean Martin ===
Prior to the COVID-19 pandemic, the band's frontman Sean Martin had been diagnosed with bipolar disorder and had previously attempted suicide. In 2020, during the pandemic, Martin was exposed to COVID-19 and began to experience intense chronic migraines. Due to the constant pain, Martin was forced to take a break from making music, with his mother Catherine mentioning how he "was desperate to get back to his music" but "the fact he was so ill [...] had an impact on his mental health".

In April 2022, the band pulled out of a tour with The Wombats due to Martin's condition, which had recently been diagnosed and required surgery. He had been receiving care at The Walton Centre's neurology department but by 2023, he had "given up all hope of recovery".

On 3 November 2023, Martin's parents performed a wellness check on Martin and entered his home with the help of a locksmith. They found Martin and two notebooks containing suicide notes. Martin's cause of death was ruled as suicide by hanging. On 6 November, the band publicly announced his death at age 26, saying he "was not just our band mate, he was our childhood best friend". The Wombats released a statement the same day, calling Martin "the nicest, most lovely guy to have around on tour".

Martin's funeral took place on 24 November at St Mary's Church in Liverpool, before he was cremated at Springwood Crematorium. In April 2024, Martin's mother Catherine performed a walk to raise money for The Migraine Trust, with over £5,000 raised as of 2025. In February 2025, she shared an article by Ben Parr discussing Martin's mental health and his legacy which confirmed the band had disbanded.

== Discography ==
=== Studio albums ===
- 0151 (2019) – No. 84 UK

=== Extended plays ===
- Get Away from the Feeling (2017)
- Bunkbed (2018)
- For Better Days (2021)
