= José Sébéloué =

French singer and musician (1948–2023)

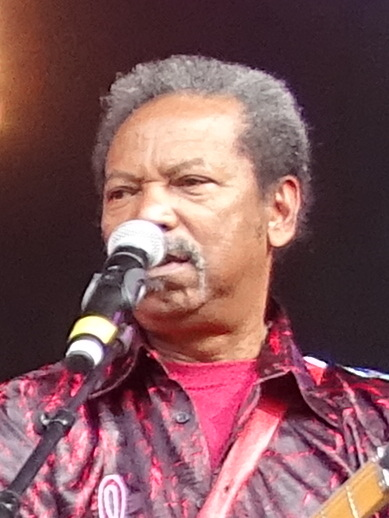
- Sébéloué in 2017
- Born: 17 September 1948; Ouanary, French Guiana, France
- Died: 3 September 2023 (aged 74); Metz, France
- Occupations: Singer; Musician

José Sébéloué (17 September 1948 – 3 September 2023) was a French singer-songwriter and guitarist. He was best known as a founding member of La Compagnie Créole in the 1980s. He founded his first group, Popcorn, in the 1970s.

Sébéloué died in Metz on 3 September 2023 at the age of 74.

== Discography ==
=== Solo ===
- Chante Avec Les Vautours
- Lanmou Ce Pas Peche
- Dou A Nani doux
- Je Ne T'Appartiens Plus
- 55 ans de musique

=== With Christian Senelis ===
- Super
