= Andreas Tsoukalas =

Andreas Tsoukalas Ανδρέας Τσουκαλάς
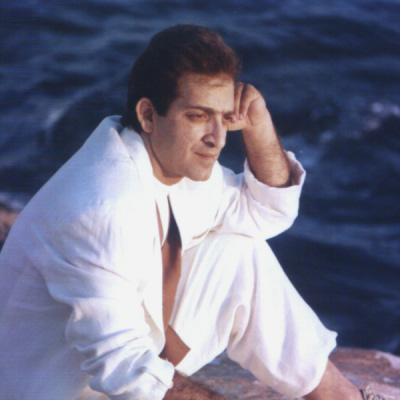

Background information
- Born: 9 January 1963; Athens, Greece
- Died: 25 July 2023 (aged 60) Athens, Greece
- Genres: Rock, pop
- Occupations: Musician, songwriter
- Years active: 1992–2023

Andreas Tsoukalas (9 January 1963 – 25 July 2023) was a Greek musician, composer, songwriter, and music producer, who translated "Sealed With a Kiss" under the title "Antio" for his second LP and CD Mia kainouria mera by LYRA Records.

His official Music Page on Facebook was Andreas Tsoukalas on Facebook and his official Myspace page was Andreas Tsoukalas on MySpace.

In 1992, he started as a lyricist, songwriter, and a singer, signing his first contract with Lyra Music Company, where his first completed work was published as a vinyl disk and as a CD, titled «Stous kairous tous ponirous». He signs this first CD both as a musician (lyrics-music) and a singer and as a music producer. This CD has known success and has been accepted both by the media, and the public – sales, when simultaneously it includes him in the category of qualitative songwriters, while parallel, in the first semester, is enlisted in top ten of the radios. The songs that have been spotted out from the same CD are "Nomiza", "Stous kairous tous ponirous", "Apla ki alithina" etc. The song "Nomiza" has been included in several collections of other music companies also, with more important the "Golden Triple" of Sony Music. (Nowadays it keeps on being sold in music stores, while "Nomiza" has been arranged by Harry Varthakouris, and has been included in his CD "Adunamia mou" by MINOS-ΕΜΙ with the same success).

In 1994, his second album "Mia kainouria mera" was released by Lyra Music Company, signing all the songs as a musician (lyrics-musing) and a singer. His second album has known similar success and it was immediately included in top ten of the radios and of the top sales. In this album "Antio" the Greek arrangement of "Sealed with a Kiss" is included. The songs that have been spotted out from the same CD are "Antio", "Sugnomi", "Mia kainouria mera", "Paropides".

Tsoukalas died on 25 July 2023, at the age of 60.
