= Berkeley Folk Music Festival =

American folk music festival, 1958–1970

- Genre: Folk music; jazz; blues; psychedelic folk; psych rock
- Location: Berkeley, California
- Years active: 1958-1970
- Founders: Barry Olivier

The Berkeley Folk Music Festival was an annual folk music festival held from 1958 to 1970 in Berkeley, California. It was directed by Barry Olivier. The Festival was one of the preeminent folk festivals on the West Coast, predating the more popular Newport Folk Festival on the East Coast.

Notable performers and artists include Joan Baez, Pete Seeger, Doc Watson, Alan Lomax, Howlin' Wolf, Phil Ochs, Alice Stuart, Jean Ritchie, Jean Redpath, Jesse Fuller, Big Mama Thornton, Mance Lipscomb, Mississippi John Hurt, Archie Green, Alan Dundes, Bess Lomax Hawes, Ewan MacColl, John Fahey, Red Krayola, Richie Havens, Phil Spector, Robbie Basho, the Jefferson Airplane, the Youngbloods, Big Brother and the Holding Company, Rabbi Shlomo Carlebach, Janice Ian, Country Joe and the Fish, and more.

== History ==
=== 1967–1970: Counterculture Years ===
The festival's willingness to embrace rock music and other forms of what would become known as roots music or Americana makes it markedly different from other folk festivals such as Newport. It exemplified the psychedelic counterculture scene of the West Coast—and the Bay Area in particular, with the festival dedicating performances to the Civil rights and Vietnam war protests.
