= Barry Olivier =

American musician (1955–2023)

Barry Olivier (November 2, 1935 – September 23, 2023) was an American guitar teacher who was the creator and producer of the Berkeley Folk Music Festival from 1958 to 1970.

== Early life ==
Olivier grew up living in the San Francisco Bay Area cities of Belvedere, Brentwood and Berkeley, moving several times as his father was a school principal. He moved to Berkeley in 1947 as a teenager. Olivier lived in Berkeley until the early 1980s, and then lived his remaining years in Oakland, California.

== Career ==
Olivier was part of the Berkeley folk music scene from the 1950s onward. He was influenced by folk revivalists such as Burl Ives, Carl Sandburg, and John Jacob Niles, who he saw perform on campus at Cal. Beginning in 1956 he hosted “The Midnight Special” on KPFA radio. He started a music instrument shop in Berkeley, The Barrel Folk Music Center, to serve the growing folk music community during the mid-1950s.

In 1958, Olivier, as a former student of UC Berkeley envisioned and created The Berkeley Folk Festival which became an annual event, directed and produced by Olivier, until 1970. Performers and workshop participants included Alan Lomax, Doc Watson and his son Merle, Joan Baez, Pete Seeger, Mississippi John Hurt, Almeda Riddle, Mance Lipscomb, Alice Stuart, and folklorists Charles Seeger and Archie Green. Associate festival producer John Chambless described Olivier as having produced the festivals almost single-handedly and with "enormous good taste." He produced all of Joan Baez’s Northern California concerts from 1962 to 1973.

In 1974, Olivier's archive of folk festival materials was acquired by Northwestern University (ibid). This festival was the subject of history and American studies professor Michael J. Kramer’s research seminar “Digitizing Folk Music History: The Berkeley Folk Festival.” In May 2011, he spoke at Northwestern about his experience during the 1960s.

In 2021, Northwestern University (ibid) published its digital archive of the Berkeley Folk Music Festival.

Olivier was a Bay Area guitar teacher. He taught a young boy from El Cerrito, California named John Fogerty his first guitar lessons, and helped Kate Wolf perfect her guitar playing technique. He was the father of five children.

In June 2020, his students formed a public Facebook group, Friends of Barry Olivier.

Barry Olivier retired from teaching in 2019, after being diagnosed with dementia. He died on the morning of September 23, 2023, at the age of 87.

== Media ==
Joan Baez concert handbill, 16 April 1967 (Barry Olivier, Producer)
