= Joseph Kamaru =

Kenyan musical artist (1939-2018)

Joseph Kamarū
- Born: 1939; Kangema, British Kenya
- Died: 3 October 2018 (aged 79); Nairobi, Kenya
- Occupations: Musician, political activist
- Years active: 1965–2018
- Musical career
- Genres: Benga, gospel
- Instruments: Vocal, guitar
- Formerly of: The Kamaru Supersounds

Joseph Kamarū (1939 – 3 October 2018) was a Kenyan Benga and gospel musician and political activist. He was an icon, a hero, and a leading Kikuyu musician, who has sold about half a million records. He was notable for his politically motivated songs either praising or criticizing the government. His music covered the teachings of life, promiscuity and sexual harassment in Kenyan politics and social culture.

He was known for his friendship with President Jomo Kenyatta, but after writing a song condemning the murder of JM Kariuki, they ceased to be close. He also wrote songs praising President Daniel arap Moi.

== Early life ==
Kamarū was from Kangema, Muranga District. In 1957 he moved to Nairobi where he got a cleaning job. His first formal job was working as a house-help and a nanny, earning enough money to purchase his first guitar. He started pursuing music in 1965.

== Career ==
Kamarū made his first breakthrough in 1967 with Celina. The height of his musical career was between 1975 and 1985 due to the release of adults-only cassettes, all dealing with Kikuyu folk songs. In the late 1980s he was the first Kenyan artist to play at the Carnivore Restaurant, then only hosting foreign artists. According to Martin Dunford, the owner of the restaurant, Kamarū's vibrant performance opened doors for other Kenyan artists to perform at the venue.

Many of Kamarū's songs were political, either praising or criticizing the government. Initially he had a good relationship with president Jomo Kenyatta, but after Kamarū wrote a song in 1975 condemning the murder of Josiah Mwangi Kariuki he fell out with him. After Kenyatta's death, the succeeding president, Daniel arap Moi, was close to the artist. In 1980, Kamarū toured Japan as a part of President Moi's entourage. After the visit he composed Safari ya Japan praising the president. Moi grew displeased with Kamarū's support for multiparty democracy in the late 1980s.

Kamarū received significant support from Voice of Kenya radio presenter Job Isaac Mwamto, who embraced the rise of Kenyan music, by presenting Kamarū's music to his radio stations. He was often called "Kenya's Jim Reeves". He recorded nearly 2,000 songs addressing morality and offering life teachings. The songs launched his status as a Kikuyu music legend and impacted East Africans’ music scene with classic hits such as "Gathoni" and "Charia Ungi". His popular songs include "muhiki wa mikosi" and "muti uyu mukuona" among others.

In the 1990s, Kamarū announced that he had been "born again" and would no longer perform the secular music on which he had built his career. He would however make several secular performances years later. In 1993, he turned to gospel music and disbanded his previous group, the Kamarū Supersounds. The change saw a plunge in his record sales. Kamarū was once the chairman of the Kenya Association of Phonographic Industries (KAPI), and owned a church ministry in Nairobi. He also ran two record stores in Nairobi. Kamarū expressed interest in building a Kikuyu cultural home on one of his many farms in Mūrang'a to safeguard and protect the Kikuyu culture, though this was not accomplished as he died in October 2018.

== Illness and death ==
In April 2018, after a circulating death hoax, Kamarū confirmed his good health in an interview with the Daily Nation. In the interview, Kamarū said "God could not take me until I oversaw changes in the music industry and mentor upcoming musicians to get the best songs for their audiences and in return get a better pay".

Kamarū died on 3 October 2018 at the age of 79 at a hospital in Nairobi from complications of Parkinson's disease. He was survived by 2 siblings, 1 daughter and 3 sons. His grandson, also named Joseph Kamarū, is an ambient musician and sound artist who goes by the artistic name KMRU and is based in Berlin.
