= 2023 in Brazilian music =

The following is a list of events and releases that have happened or are expected to happen in 2023 in music in the Brazil.

== Notable events ==
=== January ===
- 12 – Melim released her third studio album and first visual album 'Quintal'.

=== February ===
- 3 – Manu Gavassi presents her new project, Acústico MTV: Manu Gavassi Canta Fruto Proibido, where she plays Rita Lee's famous album, Fruto Proibido, released in 1975.
- 8 – Pabllo Vittar releases his fifth studio album, Noitada.

=== May ===
- 27 – First day of the second edition of the Mita Festival in the Jockey Club Brasileiro in Rio de Janeiro. It had the participation of Brazilian artists, Melly, Larinhx, MC Carol, Slipmami, Ebony, Gilsons, Jorge Ben Jor, Planet Hemp, Tropkillaz and Arthur Verocai.
- 28 – Second day of the second edition of the Mita Festival in the Jockey Club Brasileiro in Rio de Janeiro. It had the participation of Brazilian artists, Jean Tassy, Yago Oproprio, NX Zero, Carol Biazin, Scracho and Baia.
- 31 – The 30th Brazilian Music Awards took place after four years and paid tribute to singer Alcione.

=== June ===
- 3 – First day of the second edition of the Mita Festival in the Anhangabaú Valley in São Paulo. It had the participation of Brazilian artists, N.I.N.A, Avuá, Rodrigo Alarcon, Duda Beat, Djonga, BK and Natiruts.
- 4 – Second day of the second edition of the Mita Festival in the Anhangabaú Valley in São Paulo. It had the participation of Brazilian artists, Far from Alaska, Supercombo, Don L, Tasha & Tracie, Capital Inicial and NX Zero.
- 16 – Dj Marshmello together with Latin Grammy winning Brazilian producers Tropikillaz released the ep 'Mellokillaz'.
- 23 – Anitta released the single "Funk Rave", the artist's first release with the new label, Republic Records, label of the Universal group.

=== August ===
- 3 – Iza released her second studio album after five years, Afrodhit.
- 10 – Clarice Falcão released her fourth studio album, Truque.
- 15 – Jão released his fourth studio album, Super.
- 29 – Luísa Sonza released her third studio album, Escândalo Íntimo, which is her first album with the Sony label.

== Bands reformed ==
- NX Zero

== List of albums released ==
=== January ===
Date	Album	Artist	Label	Ref.
12	Quintal	Melim	Universal Music	
20	Confia (Ao Vivo)	Grupo Menos é Mais	Som Livre	

=== February ===
Date	Album	Artist	Label	Ref.
3	Acústico MTV: Manu Gavassi Canta Fruto Proibido	Manu Gavassi	Universal Music	
8	Noitada	Pabllo Vittar	Sony Music	

=== March ===
Date	Album	Artist	Label	Ref.
2	Acústico	A.D.Z		
2	Let's Bora, Vol. 2 (Ao Vivo)	Israel & Rodolffo	Som Livre	
3	Vilã	Ludmilla	Warner Music	
16	Deu Rolo in Goiânia (Ao Vivo)	Guilherme & Benuto	Sony Music	
19	Garantido por Toda a Vida	Boi Bumbá Garantido		
23	Identidade (Ao Vivo)	Maiara & Maraisa	Som Livre	
29	Reversa	Carol Biazin	Universal Music	

=== April ===
Date	Album	Artist	Label	Ref.
7	11:11	Paula Fernandes	Universal Music	
13	Keila no Estúdio Showlivre (Ao Vivo)	Keila	Show Livre	
14	Depois do Fim	Lagum	Sony Music	
18	Pólvora e Fogo (2023 remaster)	Patrícia Bastos		
27	Vício Inerente	Marina Sena	Sony Music	
29	O Brado do Povo Guerreiro	Boi Bumbá Caprichoso		

=== May ===
Date	Album	Artist	Label	Ref.
8	Paixão Nacional	Mateus Carrilho		
11	Original, Vol. 1 (Ao Vivo)	Hugo & Guilherme	Som Livre	
18	Let's Bora, Vol. 3 (Ao Vivo)	Israel & Rodolffo	Som Livre	
19	Dos Prédios Deluxe	Veigh	Supernova Entertainment	
25	Decretos Reais	Marília Mendonça	Som Livre	
25	O Último Romântico Online	Xamã	Sony Music	
26	Orí Okàn	Iara Rennó	Altafonte Music Rights	
27	Africaribe Amazon	Fineias Nelluty		

=== June ===
Date	Album	Artist	Label	Ref.
7	Jovem	Bruno Gadiol	Head Media	
8	Acústico	A.D.Z		
8	Afretopia	Cynthia Luz	Sony Music	
8	Yin Yang	Tasha & Tracie	Altaphone Music Rights	
15	Embaixador 15 Anos (Ao Vivo)	Gusttavo Lima	Sony Music	
16	Mellokillaz	Marshmello and Tropkillaz		

=== August ===
Date	Album	Artist	Label	Ref.
3	Afrodhit	Iza	Warner	
10	Truque	Clarice Falcão		
10	Lady Leste (Ao Vivo)	Gloria Groove	SB Music	
14	Super	Jão	Universal	
29	Escândalo Íntimo	Luísa Sonza	Sony	

== Top songs on records ==
=== Billboard Global 200 ===
The Billboard Global 200 is a weekly record chart published by Billboard magazine that ranks the top songs globally based on digital sales and online streaming from over 200 territories worldwide.

An asterisk (*) represents that a single is charting for the current week.

Song	Performer(s)	Entry	Peak	Weeks	Ref.
"Eu Gosto Assim"	Gustavo Mioto and Mari Fernandez	November 5, 2022	155	5	
"Evoque Prata"	MC Menor HR, MC Menor SG and DJ Escobar	December 3, 2022	147	3	
"Bombonzinho"	Israel & Rodolffo and Ana Castela	January 7, 2023	119	9	
"Leão"	Marília Mendonça	January 21, 2023	51	13	
"Zona de Perigo"	Léo Santana	February 18, 2023	36	4	
"Lovezinho"	Treyce	March 4, 2023	160	2	
"Nosso Quadro"	Ana Castela	March 11, 2023	95	15	
"Erro Gostoso"	Simone Mendes	May 13, 2023	192	1	
"Tá OK"	Dennis and Kevin O Chris	June 17, 2023	83	3*	

== Deaths ==
- 3 January – Rita de Cássia, Brazilian forró singer and songwriter, 50.
- 7 January – Manhoso, Brazilian singer and composer, 87.
- 13 January – Carlos Colla, Brazilian composer and producer, 78.
- 19 January – Sérgio Abreu, Brazilian guitarist and violinist, 74.
- 22 February – Germano Mathias, Brazilian singer-songwriter and composer, 88.
- 4 March – Sueli Costa, Brazilian singer and composer, 79.
- 10 March –
  - Bebeto Castilho, Brazilian musician, former member of the musical group Tamba Trio, 83.
  - Servio Tulio, Brazilian musician and broadcaster, 59.
- 13 March – Canisso, Brazilian bassist, former member of the bands Raimundos, Rockfellas and Rodox, 57.
- 15 March – Théo de Barros, Brazilian singer-songwriter, violinist and arranger, 80.
- 23 March – DJ Jamaika, Brazilian rapper, 55.
- 25 March – Juca Chaves, Brazilian composer, musician and comedian, 84.
- 7 April – Cynara, Brazilian singer, arranger and composer, member of the group Quarteto em Cy, 78.
- 14 April – Fughetti Luz, Brazilian singer-songwriter, 76.
- 17 April – Ivan Conti, Brazilian drummer and composer, member of the group Azymuth, 76.
- 22 April – André Pomba, Brazilian DJ and musician, 59.
- 3 May – Velho Milongueiro, Brazilian singer and composer, 83.
- 8 May – Rita Lee, Brazilian rock singer, composer, and writer, 75.
- 10 May – Luiz Carlos Borges, Brazilian instrumentalist, composer, and interpreter, 70.
- 12 May – Dum-Dum, Brazilian rapper, 54.
- 5 June – Astrud Gilberto, Brazilian samba and bossa nova singer and songwriter, 83.
- 6 June – Carlos Moura, Brazilian MPB composer and singer, 73.
- 8 June – Hélio Turco, Brazilian composer and samba dancer, 87.
- 15 June – Luiz Schiavon, Brazilian composer and keyboardist, member of the band RPM, 64.
