= Alejandro Meerapfel =

Argentine operatic baritone (1969–2023)

- Born: 1969; Argentina
- Died: 22 September 2023 (aged 54); Ambronay, France
- Occupation: Opera singer

Alejandro Meerapfel (1969 – 22 September 2023) was an Argentine operatic baritone.

== Biography ==
Born in Argentina in 1969, Meerapfel lived in Dijon for around four to five years after moving there from Buenos Aires, specializing in Baroque music as a member of the Cappella Mediterranea.

During a performance at the Ambronay Festival on 22 September 2023, he collapsed on stage following a heart attack while performing as God the Father in the Antonio Draghi oratorio Il Dono della Vita eterna. The performance, broadcast on France Télévisions, was interrupted and evacuated. Meerapfel subsequently died at the age of 54.
