= Angelita Vargas =

Spanish dancer (1946–2023)

Ángela Vargas Vega (1946 – 11 November 2023), better known by her artistic name of Angelita Vargas, was a Spanish Romani flamenco dancer and singer, considered one of the greatest stars of the Andalusian music scene. New York Magazine said that she "uses her legs like a compass—one foot pivoting in place while the other delicately taps out a circle—a second time, the "specialty" seems to degenerate into a trick." She was married to "Biencasao", and is the mother of dancer Joselito (José Cortés Vargas).

Dancing since the age of 3, by 8 she was performing in a group called "La Gitanilla" throughout Spain. She performed in a group at Expo 98. She performed in Great Britain, North America, Japan, the Netherlands and Germany and was a recipient of the Premio Pastora Imperio (Córdoba, 1980) and the Premio Nacional al baile de la Cátedra de Flamencología (Jerez, 1986).

Vargas died of a stroke on 11 November 2023, at the age of 77.

== See also ==
- Women in dance
