= George Zukerman =

Canadian classical bassoonist (1927–2023)

- Born: George Benedict Zukerman; February 22, 1927; London, England
- Died: February 1, 2023 (aged 95); White Rock, British Columbia
- Occupations: Classical bassoonist; Impresario
- Awards: Order of Canada; Order of British Columbia

George Benedict Zukerman, OC OBC (February 22, 1927 – February 1, 2023) was a Canadian bassoonist and impresario. He was the younger brother of the musicologist, Joseph Kerman. From 1980, he lived with his partner, violinist and teacher, Erika Bennedik, in South Surrey, B.C. He was the founder of White Rock Concerts.

== Awards and recognitions ==
In 1992, he was made an Officer of the Order of Canada. In 1993, he received the National Arts Centre Award for Distinguished Contribution to Touring from the Canadian National Arts Centre. In 1996, he was awarded the Order of British Columbia. He was also the recipient of both the Golden Jubilee Medal and the Diamond Jubilee Medal.
