= 2023 in Swedish music =

The following is a list of notable events and releases of the year 2023 in Swedish music.

== Events ==
=== January ===
- 28 – High 5ive Winter Fest started in Gothenburg.

=== March ===
- 16 – The Summerburst Festival in Gothenburg set for June was cancelled.

=== May ===
- 13 – Loreen won Eurovision with her song Tattoo

=== June ===
- 7 – The 30th Sweden Rock Festival started in Norje (June 7 - 10).
- 29 – Lollapalooza Stockholm 2023 started in Stockholm (June 29 - July 1).

=== August ===
- 10 – The 14th Way Out West Festival started in Gothenburg (August 10 - 12).

=== October ===
- 25 – The 56th Umeå Jazz Festival started in Umeå (October 25 - 28).

== Musical releases ==
=== August ===
| Day | Title | Artist | Format | Label | Note | Ref |
|---|---|---|---|---|---|---|
| 11 | The Death of Randy Fitzsimmons | The Hives | Album | Disques Hives | | |

=== September ===
| Day | Title | Artist | Format | Label | Note | Ref |
|---|---|---|---|---|---|---|
| 15 | En annan jag | Darin | Album | Universal Music Group | | |

== Deaths ==
=== April ===
7 – Lasse Wellander, guitarist of ABBA.

=== May ===
1 – Pugh Rogefeldt

=== October ===
19 – Lasse Berghagen

== See also ==
- 2023 in Sweden
- Sweden in the Eurovision Song Contest 2023
