= 0151 (album) =

Studio album by The Night Café
- Released: 23 August 2019
- Studios: Whitewood Recording Studio, Liverpool
- Genres: Indie pop; indie rock
- Length: 62:00
- Language: English
- Label: AWAL
- Producer: Robert Whiteley

Singles from 0151
- 1. "Endless Lovers" Released: 24 January 2019; 2. "Turn" Released: 7 May 2019; 3. "Please" Released: 8 May 2019; 4. "Finders Keepers" Released: 18 June 2019; 5. "Mixed Signals" Released: 16 July 2019; 6. "A Message to Myself" Released: 6 August 2019

0151 is the only studio album by English indie pop band The Night Café, released on 23 August 2019 through AWAL. 0151 features 18 tracks all written by band members Sean Martin, Josh Higgins, Arran O'Connell Whittle and Carl Dillon, and is produced by Robert Whiteley. 0151 was the only album released by the band, which disbanded following Martin's death in 2023

== Background ==
Early in the recording process, the band chose the name of 0151 based on Liverpool's telephone area code as a nod to their hometown. From there, the theme of the album and cover art naturally came to fruition. Originally, the plan for 0151 was a standard 12-track album with two singles but this quickly developed into an 18-track album with six singles. The album was also originally going to open with the band's 2015 debut single "Addicted", however it was later moved to track 13 upon release.

On 24 January 2019, the band released "Endless Lovers", the first single from the album. The song was written by the band's late frontman Sean Martin who described it as "an important message that you should sort of 'check yourself before you wreck yourself' in a relationship" and admitted it was about his feelings of depression. On 7 May, the band released "Turn" along with an accompanying music video on 23 May, which shows the group in various locations across Liverpool. A day later, on 8 May, "Please" was released. The music video for the single was not filmed until a year later during the COVID-19 pandemic, being uploaded on 17 April 2020.

On 19 June, "Finders Keepers" was released as the fourth single. The track received an accompanying music video on 5 July showing the band enjoying tea in a residential house before exploring the neighbourhood. On 16 July, the group re-released "Mixed Signals" from their previous EP as the fifth single, and labeled the original as the "EP Version".

The final single, "A Message to Myself", was released on 6 August.

== Production ==
0151 was recorded at Whitewood Recording Studio in Liverpool, owned by the album's producer Robert Whiteley. The album's guitar soundscapes were created via custom-made amplifiers running through Vox AC30 cabs, using Fender Mustangs and Gibson ES-335s.

== Critical reception ==
Upon release, 0151 received positive reviews from critics.

Laura Freyaldenhoven of Dork Magazine gave the album 4 stars out of 5, praising the "thunderous beats of Carl's drums" and the "laidback sounds of 'Mother and 'I Know (I'm Sure)'. Freyaldenhoven labelled the album "a debut that has the potential of securing them a spot at the top of the indie scene". The Rodeo Magazine also gave the album 4 stars out of 5, pointing out the album's sectioning into four segments through the use of interludes. The magazine described the experimentation on the album as "either basking in nostalgia with the likes of the Bon Iver-esque, introspective 'A Message to Myself', or having a boogie to the upbeat, old-school likes of 'Mixed Signals'".

In a 2023 retrospective, Nick Wallace of Unraveled Edit called 0151 an "underrated masterpiece", praising the production and Dillon's drums while labelling the album as "impressionist rock". Wallace noted that 0151 had "hallmarks of shoegaze" but "the haziness has clarity and precision that keeps it from being too abstract", and compared the album to "lightning in a bottle" and "the new diamond standard of debut efforts".

On the aggregate site Album of the Year, 0151 has a rating of 77/100 based on 68 ratings.

== Track listing ==
No.	Title	Length
1.	"0151 Intro"	1:53
2.	"Finders Keepers"	3:30
3.	"Felicity"	3:13
4.	"Please"	3:50
5.	"Mother"	4:41
6.	"Breathing in"	0:33
7.	"Turn"	3:59
8.	"Calling Your Name (Again)"	2:06
9.	"Endless Lovers"	3:27
10.	"Strange Clothes"	3:38
11.	"Take Care, Pt. 1"	1:47
12.	"I Know (I'm Sure)"	6:58
13.	"Addicted"	4:41
14.	"I'm Fine"	3:43
15.	"In My Head"	4:08
16.	"A Message to Myself"	3:08
17.	"Mixed Signals"	3:26
18.	"Leave Me Alone"	4:08

== Charts ==
Weekly chart performance for 0151
Chart (2019)	Peak position
UK Albums (OCC)	84
