= Tommi Stumpff =

German musician (1958–2023)

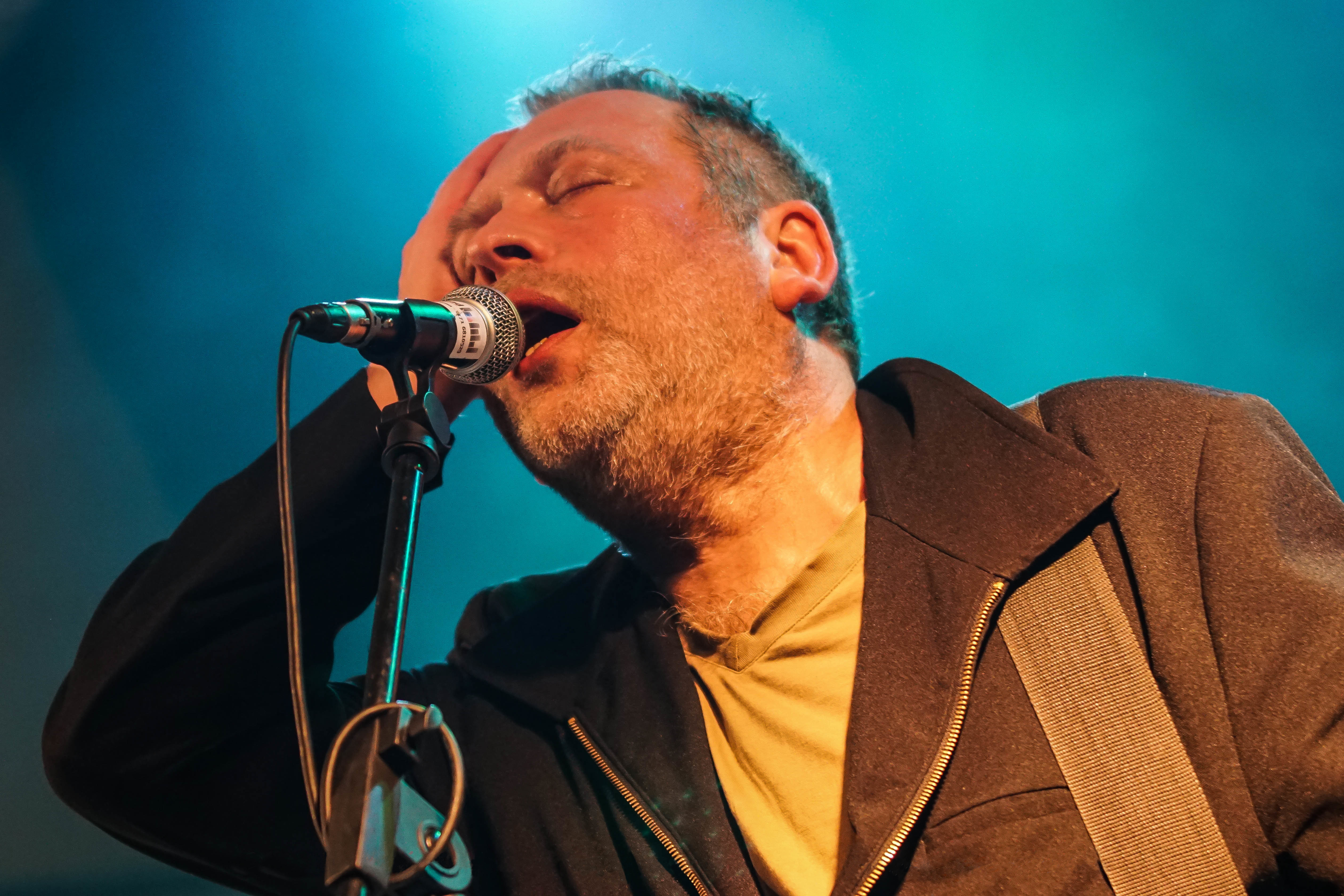
- Stumpff in 2015

Background information
- Also known as: Pierre Thomas
- Born: 1 February 1958; Düsseldorf, North Rhine-Westphalia, West Germany
- Origin: 28 July 2023 (aged 65)
- Genres: Electronic body music
- Instruments: Vocals, guitar, synthesizer, programming
- Years active: 1979–1993, 2008, 2015–2023
- Labels: Schallmauer, No Dance, Electrola, Striclty Dance, EMI, Our Choice, Mental Decay, Frühstyxradio
- Website: www.stumpff.net

Thomas Peters (1 February 1958 – 28 July 2023), known professionally as Tommi Stumpff, was a German musician who played Electronic Body Music in the 1980s.

== Biography ==
Stumpff spent his childhood with his family in Paris and Brussels before moving back to his birthplace, Düsseldorf. In the late 1970s he formed punk band KFC, as its lead singer.

His solo debut album Zu spät Ihr Scheisser was released on Düsseldorf independent label Schallmauer Records selling 3,000 units.

The following single Contergan Punk was released on the Giftplatten label in 1983. It was produced by sound engineer Conny Plank and featured a heavy electropunk sound that would become characteristic of EBM.

Tommi Stumpff died on 28 July 2023, at the age of 65.

== Discography ==
- 1982 – Zu spät Ihr Scheisser (LP)
- 1983 – Contergan Punk (12")
- 1985 – Seltsames Glück (12")
- 1988 – ...und so sterbt alle! (12")
- 1988 – Meine Sklavin (7")
- 1988 – Terror II (LP/CD)
- 1989 – Ultra (LP/CD)
- 1989 – Lobotomie
- 1991 – Mich kriegt Ihr nicht (LP/CD)
- 1991 – 13 Minuten Massaker (MCD)
- 1991 – Trivial Shock (CD)
- 1992 – Trivial Schock (Cuts)
- 1992 – TV Ritual (MCD)
- 1992 – Paradies (MCD)
- 1992 – Brettermeier Die Pottsau – Arschkrampen-Tekkno (together with Dietmar Wischmeyer) (MCD/12")
- 1993 – Bommerlunder (together with Luc Van Leuven as Die Technodosen) (MCD/12")
- 1993 – Alle sind tot (CD)
- 1993 – Oligophrenie (12")
- 2002 – Festival of Darkness (Online Album)
- 2021 – Alles Idioten (CD/LP/Download)
