= Buzy (singer) =

French singer

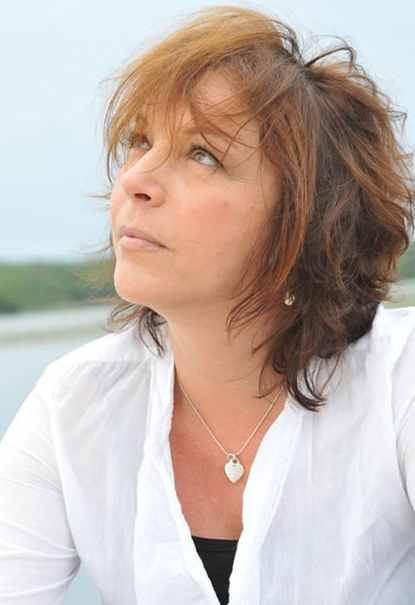

Background information
- Birth name: Marie-Claire Girod
- Born: 14 February 1957; Metz, France
- Died: 14 November 2023 (aged 66); Paris, France
- Occupation: Singer
- Years active: 1980–2023

Marie-Claire Girod (14 February 1957 – 14 November 2023), best known by her stage name Buzy, was a French singer.

== Personal life ==
Buzy died on 14 November 2023, at the age of 66.

== Albums ==
- Insomnies 1981
- Adrian 1983
- I Love You Lulu 1985
- Rebel 1989
- Rêve éveillé 1993
- Délits 1998
- Borderlove 2005
- Au bon moment, au bon endroit 2010

=== Main singles ===
- 1981: Dyslexique / Osmose (j’vais pas mourir)
- 1981: Engrenage / Sweet lullaby
- 1983: Adrian / Prologue
- 1983: Adrénaline / Bleu
- 1986: Body Physical / Je, I remember
- 1986: Body Physical (remix)
- 1987: Baby boum / Stop eject
- 1988: Baby boum (special remix club)
- 1989: Shepard
- 1989: Keep cool (version maxi)
- 1990: Sweet soul / Night and day
- 1990: Sweet soul (Goldfinger mix) / Sweet soul (Chelsea mix)
- 1993: Le ciel est rouge (maxi avec 3 versions remix)
- 1994: Génération
- 1994: Les années Lula
- 1994: La vie c’est comme un hôtel
- 1998: Up and down
- 2000: Délits
- 2005: Je suis un arbre
- 2006: Borderlove
- 2006: Comme des papillons (avec Daniel Darc)
- 2010: Au bon moment, au bon endroit
- 2010: Sous X
