= Niel Immelman =

South African pianist (1944–2023)

Niel Immelman (13 August 1944 – 7 June 2023) was a South African classical pianist resident in the UK. He grew up in Jacobsdal and later in Bloemfontein.

Immelman first received piano lessons from his mother Nettie Immelman. He subsequently studied at the Royal College of Music (RCM) with Cyril Smith. He was also a pupil of Ilona Kabos, Lamar Crowson, and Maria Curcio. Whilst still a student at the Royal College of Music, Bernard Haitink invited him to perform Rachmaninoff's Rhapsody on a Theme of Paganini with the London Philharmonic Orchestra, as his professional debut.

Immelman made a speciality of Czech piano music, and made commercial recordings of the piano works of Josef Suk and of Vítězslav Novák, for the Meridian label. His four CD recordings of the complete piano works of Suk was the first complete commercial recorded cycle.

Immelman was on the piano faculty of the RCM. He was made a fellow of the RCM in 2000. He served regularly as a jury member in various international piano competitions.

Niel Immelman died of heart failure on 7 June 2023, at the age of 78.
