= Hafiz Abdelrahman =

Sudanese flutist (died 2023)

Ever Lasting Days cover in 1999

Hafiz Abdelrahman Mukhtar (Arabic: حافظ عبد الرحمن مختار; died 21 July 2023) was a Sudanese flutist, whose music was used on a number of radio stations, both nationally and internationally. He was one of the first Sudanese artists to present musical breaks at the John F. Kennedy Center for the Performing Arts in Washington D.C., and his music usually focuses on the simple men of Sudan, and their grievances.

== Biography ==
Hafiz Abdelrahman was born in Nyala, the capital of the state of South Darfur, and began playing the flute at an early age. He then moved to Khartoum to support his talent by studying music and drama at the University of Sudan in 1981. His beginnings were in the television industry when his first piece The Old Port was used as a slogan for the program Dinya Dabanga, which was presented by Muhammad Suleiman on Omdurman TV and Radio.

Abdelrahman obtained a master's degree in the specialty of instrumental music, and he learned from European conservatories, which led him to play a mixture of European and Sudanese music together. One of his most famous pieces is The Eternal Days, which was published in an album with the same title, which was distributed globally by the American Amazon.com, and thus is the first Sudanese album with authentic Sudanese music on Amazon. He composed up to 81 pieces of music on the flute, including Until We Meet, Whispering Fingers, Between Memory and Grief, and The Rhythm of the Mountain.

Abdelrahman, through the flute, tried to convey grief to listeners and his music usually focused on the simple man of Sudan. He was considered to be a musician with a wide culture and remarkable skill and represented Sudan in a number of Arab and international forums like the United Arab Emirates. He was one of the first Sudanese artists to present musical breaks at the John F. Kennedy Center for the Performing Arts in Washington DC. His music was used on a number of radio stations, both nationally and internationally, like BBC Radio, Voice of America (VOA), and Monte Carlo (MCD).

In December 2021, after a wide social media circulation of a rumour about Hafez's father's health and his family's ability to afford his treatments, his family issued a clarification, in which Zariab Hafiz Abdelrahman reassured the public about the health of his father. He said that the rumour had caused the family a great discomfort and that they did not have financial issues to treat their father, who suffered from Alzheimer's.

Hafiz Abdelrahman died on 21 July 2023. He was buried in Al-Sarha Cemetery, Omdurman.
