= Garry Mapanzure =

Zimbabwean singer-songwriter (1998–2023)

- Born: Garry Garikai Munashe Mapanzure; 18 June 1998; Harare, Zimbabwe
- Died: 13 October 2023 (aged 25) Masvingo, Zimbabwe
- Genres: Afropop; gospel; R&B
- Occupation: Singer
- Years active: 2014–2023
- Label: Runabeat Music

Garry Garikai Munashe Mapanzure (18 June 1998 – 13 October 2023) was a Zimbabwean Afropop singer.

== Early life and education ==
Born Garry Garikai Munashe Mapanzure in Harare, Zimbabwe, Garry grew up in church to pastoral parents and it is in church where he discovered his singing ability and honed his talent. He attended Kyle Preparatory School and continued to primary and high school at the same institution.

== Music career ==
Mapanzure started his musical career in late 2017 and released his first single Wapunza which as of October 2023 has been viewed over 4.3 million times on YouTube.

2019 saw the contemporary artist being nominated for an AFRIMA award in the Best Artiste, Duo, or Group in African R'N'B & Soul category for his song TV Room, a collaboration with Hillzy.

In November 2018, he entered the emPawa Africa challenge created by Mr Eazi to help up-and-coming African artists launch their careers. To enter the contest, artists had to upload a short video of themselves performing either an original song, cover, or freestyle. Mapanzure won and became the tenth emPawa Africa pick, the first ever from Zimbabwe. Through this initiative, Mapanzure released Slow, which was then uploaded onto the emPawa YouTube channel.

== Artistry ==
In an interview with All Africa, Mapanzure described his sound as "Afropop", a fusion of Pop and Afrobeats.

== Personal life and death ==
Mapanzure was studying Architectural Design at North China University of Technology before being signed to London-based record label, Runabeat Music. Under the label he released his first EP, Sushi Season: The First, in March 2020. His first world tour scheduled for March 2020 to support the EP's release was cancelled due to the global outbreak of coronavirus. Mapanzure resided in London, working on future music audio and visual projects until the coronavirus pandemic would pass. He spoke in Shona, one of the languages spoken in Zimbabwe.

Garry Mapanzure died from injuries sustained in a traffic accident in Masvingo, on 13 October 2023. He was 25. He is survived by his wife Vimbai and a son.

== Discography ==
=== Singles ===
Garry Mapanzure - Singles and Collaborations
Title	Artistes	Year
Wapunza	Garry Mapanzure feat. Vicky	2017
Moyo Muti	Garry Mapanzure	2018
TV Room	Garry Mapanzure & Hillzy	2019
Slow	Garry Mapanzure	2019
Your Man	Garry Mapanzure	2019
We Party All Night	Pungwe Sessions Vol II feat. Garry Mapanzure, Rhymez and Soko Matemai	2020
Ndianifuna	Garry Mapanzure	2020
Show me Love	Garry Mapanzure	2021
Zvinoitwa	Garry Mapanzure	2021
Body Language	Garry Mapanzure & Nutty O	2022
Aida	Garry Mapanzure & Shinsoman	2022

=== Compilations ===
Garry Mapanzure's first music compilation, Sushi Season: The First, was released in March 2020. Garry's first album Special Delivery, was released on 5 February 2022 and his second album “NOVUS” was released on 7 July 2023.

Sushi Season: The First - Released in March 2020
TRACK #	TITLE OF TRACK	ARTISTE(S)	RECORD LABEL
1	Go Low	Garry Mapanzure	Runabeat Music
2	Nditaurireiwo	Garry Mapanzure	Runabeat Music
3	Sweet Nothings	Garry Mapanzure	Runabeat Music
4	Way It Goes	Garry Mapanzure	Runabeat Music
5	Alone	Garry Mapanzure	Runabeat Music
6	More	Garry Mapanzure	Runabeat Music
7	Mungandigona	Garry Mapanzure	Runabeat Music
8	Pindirai (A Million Tears)	Garry Mapanzure	Runabeat Music

Special Delivery - Released in February 2022
TRACK #	TITLE OF TRACK	ARTISTE(S)	RECORD LABEL
1	Malawi	Garry Mapanzure	Team1Love
2	Twist	Garry Mapanzure	Team1Love
3	Bipolar Love	Garry Mapanzure	Team1Love
4	How Love Is	Garry Mapanzure & Nashe	Team1Love
5	Nherera	Garry Mapanzure	Team1Love
6	My family	Garry Mapanzure	Team1Love
7	Nyarara Usabvunze (Shh)	Garry Mapanzure & Victor Mapanzure	Team1Love
8	Radio	Garry Mapanzure	Team1Love
9	On You	Garry Mapanzure & Kae Chaps	Team1Love
10	Proposal	Garry Mapanzure	Team1Love
11	A.M.O.L (Interlude)	Garry Mapanzure	Team1Love
12	Chara Chimwe	Garry Mapanzure & Hillzy	Team1Love
13	Birthday (Special Delivery)	Garry Mapanzure	Team1Love
14	Winner	Garry Mapanzure	Team1Love

NOVUS- Released in July 2023
TRACK #	TITLE OF TRACK	ARTISTE(S)	RECORD LABEL
1	Rigiyoni Takawanda	Garry Mapanzure	Team1Love
2	KuDeepisa	Garry Mapanzure	Team1Love
3	KuHadhira	Garry Mapanzure & Bagga	Team1Love
4	Lonely Ogre	Garry Mapanzure	Team1Love
5	Pahushamwari hwedu	Garry Mapanzure & Nashe	Team1Love
6	Chimoko chiDanger	Garry Mapanzure & Takura	Team1Love
7	Sweet Angela	Garry Mapanzure	Team1Love
8	Ayawa	Garry Mapanzure	Team1Love
9	Iwe neni	Garry Mapanzure	Team1Love
10	Song for ya	Garry Mapanzure	Team1Love

== Awards and nominations ==
=== AFRIMA Awards ===
Year	Nominee / work	Award	Result	Ref
2019	Himself	BEST ARTISTE, DUO OR GROUP IN AFRICAN R'N'B & SOUL	Won	

=== Masvingo Music and Arts Awards ===
Year	Nominee / work	Award	Result	Ref
2019	Himself	OUTSTANDING MALE ARTISTE	Won	

=== Glamour Awards ===
Year	Nominee / work	Award	Result	Ref
2018	Himself	BEST UPCOMING ARTIST	Won	

== See also ==
- List of Zimbabwean musicians
- List of people who died in traffic collisions
