= Evgeniy Shiryaev =

Russian composer (1943–2023)

- Евгений Ширяев
- Born: Evgeniy Aleksandrovich Shiryaev; 23 September 1943; Leningrad, Soviet Union
- Died: 2 November 2023 (aged 80); Odintsovo, Moscow Oblast, Russia
- Occupation: Composer

Evgeniy Aleksandrovich Shiryaev (Russian: Евге́ний Алекса́ндрович Ширя́ев; 23 September 1943 – 2 November 2023) was a Soviet and Russian composer, author of music for more than 100 films, instrumental concerts, operas, ballets and vocal works.

Shiryaev graduated from the Oryol College of Music. He worked as a conductor in the Tashkent variety orchestra and was the first musical director of the band "Yalla". Songs by Evgeniy Shiryaev were performed by Sofia Rotaru, Mikhail Boyarsky, Masha Rasputina and others.
