= Soviet economic blockade of Lithuania =

1990 geopolitical event

- Part of the Singing Revolution and the dissolution of the Soviet Union
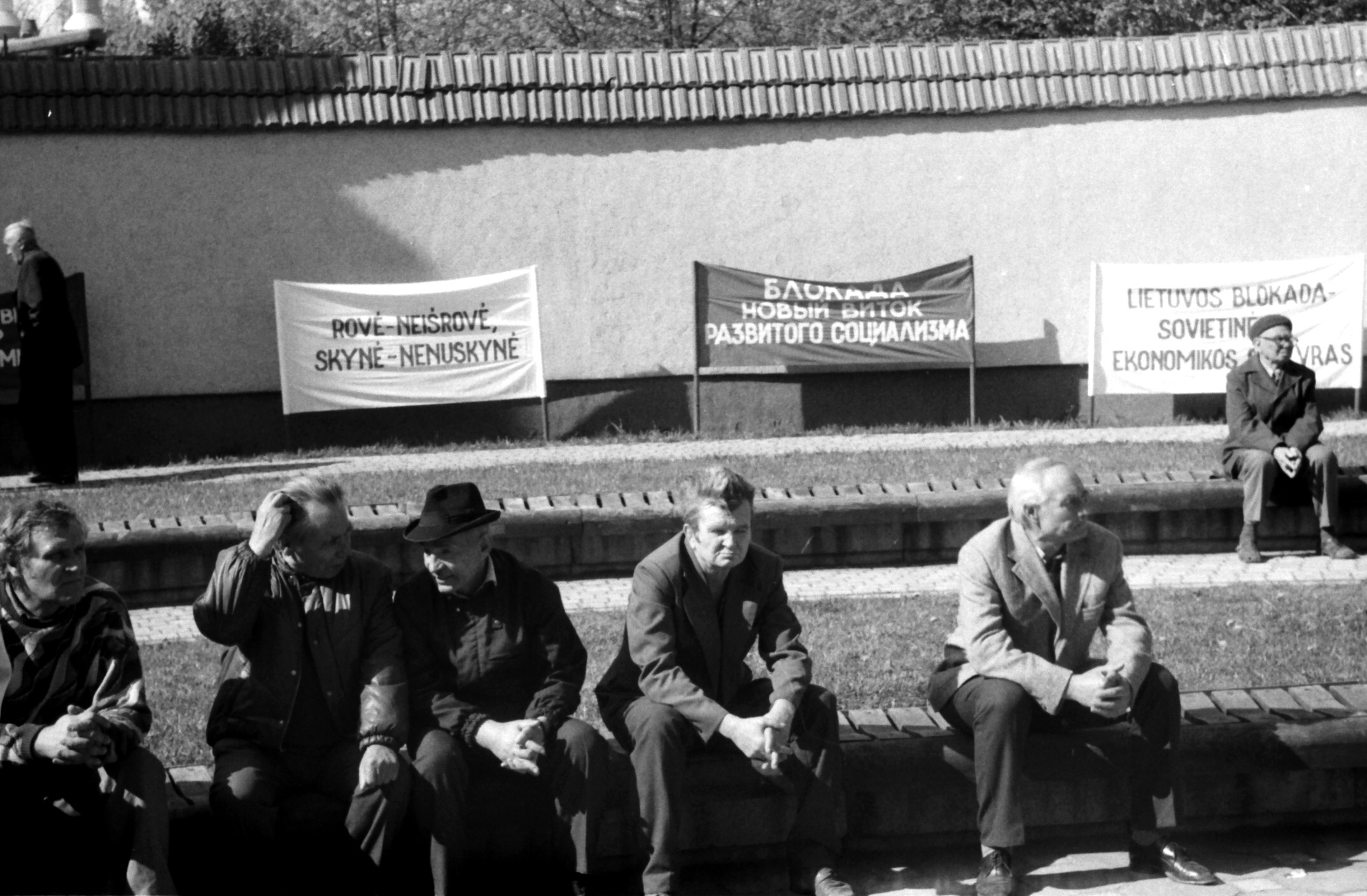
- Demonstration in Šiauliai against the economic blockade on 1 May 1990
Date	18 April – 2 July 1990 (78 days)
Location	Lithuania
Result	Blockade lifted: Negotiations over the future of Lithuanian-USSR relations started; Effects of the Act of the Re-Establishment of the State of Lithuania suspended; Statehood de facto preserved; Expiration of the suspension leads to January Events; Soviet aggression on Lithuania's borders

Belligerents
Lithuania; Supported by: Latvia; Estonia	Soviet Union

Commanders and leaders
Vytautas Landsbergis; Kazimira Prunskienė; Algirdas Brazauskas; Romualdas Ozolas	Mikhail Gorbachev; Nikolai Ryzhkov

The Soviet Union imposed an economic blockade on Lithuania between 18 April and 2 July 1990. By the late 1980s, Mikhail Gorbachev, leader of the Soviet Union, embarked on a course of liberalisation of the political system of the country, and as a result, movements appeared that advocated for autonomy or independence within the Soviet Union. The Lithuanian Supreme Council then adopted the Act of the Re-Establishment of the State of Lithuania (Act) on 11 March 1990. Kremlin officials demanded that the Act be annulled, interpreting it as a secessionist affair, but Lithuania ignored them, arguing that they were forcefully incorporated into the USSR back in 1940. Gorbachev sent an ultimatum on 13 April, requiring Lithuanians to back down under the threat of economic sanctions. As the Soviet officials were not satisfied with the answer from Lithuania, the blockade started on 18 April at 21:25 (EEST).

The economic blockade restricted or cancelled the centralised supply of energy resources, which Lithuania was extremely dependent on the USSR for, as well as foodstuffs and pharmaceuticals. To a lesser extent, the embargo also impacted Kaliningrad Oblast. The Soviet Union sealed the republic's borders and blocked Lithuania's bank accounts. As the rebel republic felt crippling shortages of essential items, Western countries pressured Lithuania and the Soviet Union to reach a compromise, which initially could not be achieved. However, amid the intensification of internal sovereigntist movements within the other fourteen republics of the Soviet Union, particularly within the Russian Soviet Federative Socialist Republic (RSFSR), the blockade was eased in mid-June, and the sanctions were lifted on 2 July. This happened after the Lithuanian parliament agreed to suspend the effects of the Act and to begin talks with the Soviet side. The long-awaited negotiations, however, did not yield any results.

Despite its short duration, the blockade had profound effects on the country. Total losses from the blockade on the Lithuanian side exceeded 500 million roubles, or 1.5% of the gross national product (GNP). Thousands of workers lost their jobs or were idling at their factories as supplies were lacking. Effects on market transition were mixed. The embargo forced Lithuania to centralise its governance and strengthen regulation of resource usage. Enterprises created partnerships with fellow companies and Lithuania negotiated trade agreements with other republics, marking a transition to capitalist economics. It also made the country look for other ways to import oil and start industrial exploitation of its resources. The economic blockade also slowed the pace of separation of the other two Baltic states, Latvia and Estonia, from the Soviet Union. The role of the minorities (particularly the Poles) in the blockade is unclear but some speculate that the Polish minority, which was dominated by pro-Soviet politicians, was treated preferentially during the blockade by the Soviet Union.

== Background ==
Shortly after Germany and the Soviet Union signed the Molotov–Ribbentrop Pact in 1939, the Baltic states were occupied and illegally incorporated into the Soviet Union, which was interrupted by three years of German occupation before reverting to the USSR after World War II. Despite being part of the Soviet Union for more than 40 years, in the 1980s, the Baltic states were still seen as somewhat different from the rest of the USSR.

After Mikhail Gorbachev was elected leader of the Communist Party of the Soviet Union (CPSU) in 1985, the Soviet government gradually introduced some liberalisation measures, including perestroika and glasnost. These policies enabled massive demonstrations in most Soviet republics. In the Baltic states, the gatherings, which initially protested the environmentally-unfriendly projects of the central government, turned more and more political. By late summer 1988, Sąjūdis, the movement which was initially in favour of perestroika, demanded legalisation of the Lithuanian interwar flag, resignation of the republic's government and sovereignty for Lithuania. By early 1989, the movement already pushed for independence from USSR.

These demands were eventually implemented. In November 1988, the Supreme Soviet of the Lithuanian Soviet Socialist Republic established the tricolored flag as the flag of the republic. In May 1989, the republic issued a declaration of sovereignty. It asserted the primacy of Lithuanian law, though still in the framework of the Soviet Union. While the declaration expressly violated Article 74 of the 1977 Constitution, which said that Soviet law should prevail in case of conflicting legislation, no actions were undertaken by the officials in the Kremlin – to the contrary, in November 1989, the Soviet Union made some concessions by approving a plan of financial and economical autonomy for the Baltic republics.

At the same time, revelations in Lithuania concerning the secret protocols of the Molotov–Ribbentrop pact (whose existence the USSR had denied) further angered the opposition, which demanded their disclosure and condemnation. The Soviet Union formally acknowledged their existence in December 1989, following deliberations of a select committee in the Congress of People's Deputies, and declared them "legally untenable and invalid from the moment they were signed". Finally, Gorbachev had problems inside his party. In December 1989, Algirdas Brazauskas, the leader of the Communist Party of Lithuania (CPL), announced that CPL was independent from CPSU, despite pleas not to do so by Gorbachev. Angry, the Central Committee of CPSU sent Gorbachev to Vilnius to quell the party revolt. However, the First Secretary failed to subordinate party rebels and his trip only made Lithuanians press harder for independence.

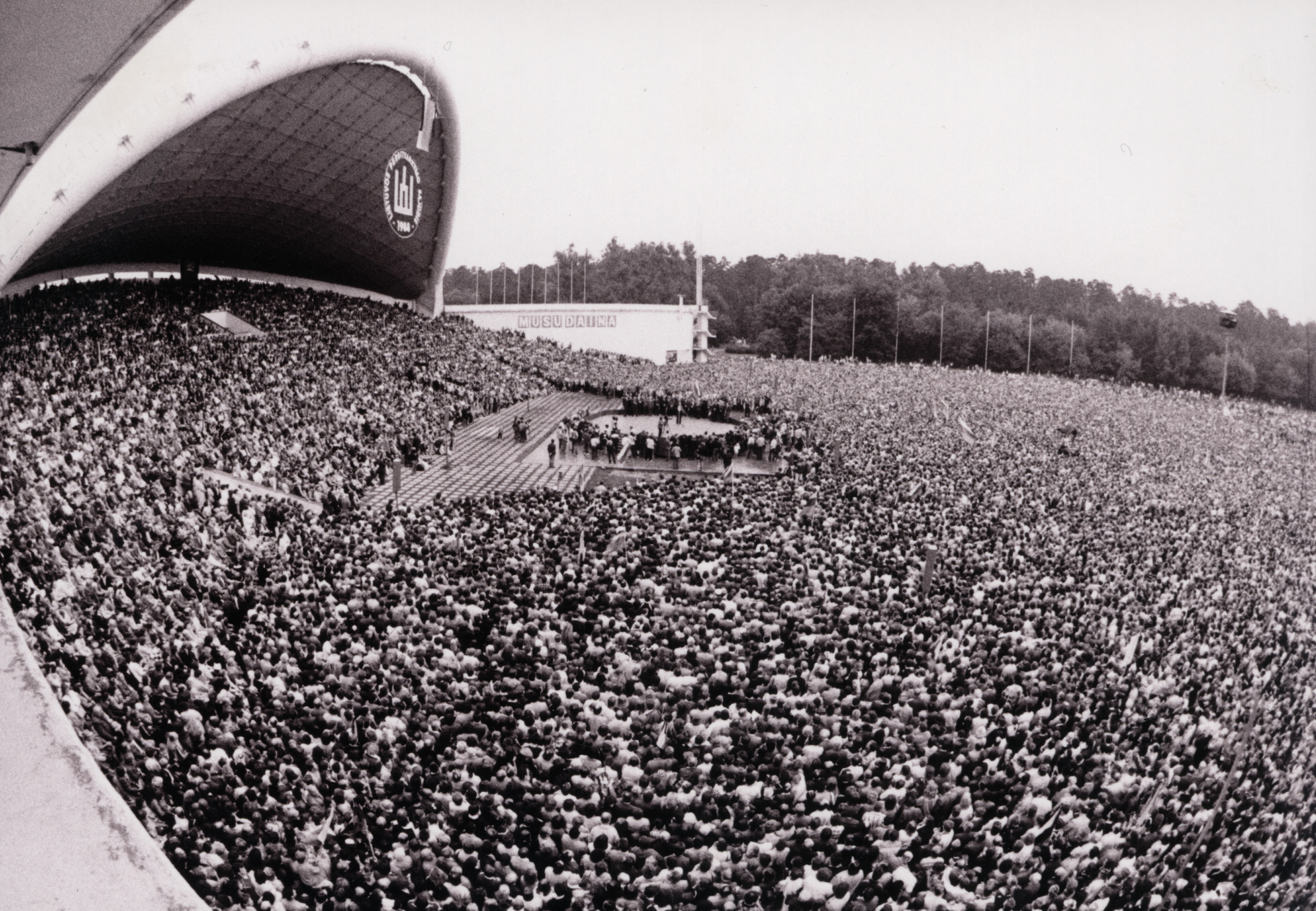
An August 1988 rally in commemoration and condemnation of the Molotov–Ribbentrop Pact in Vingis Park, Vilnius, organised by Sąjūdis. Participation is estimated to have reached 150,000–200,000 people.

== Restoration of independence ==
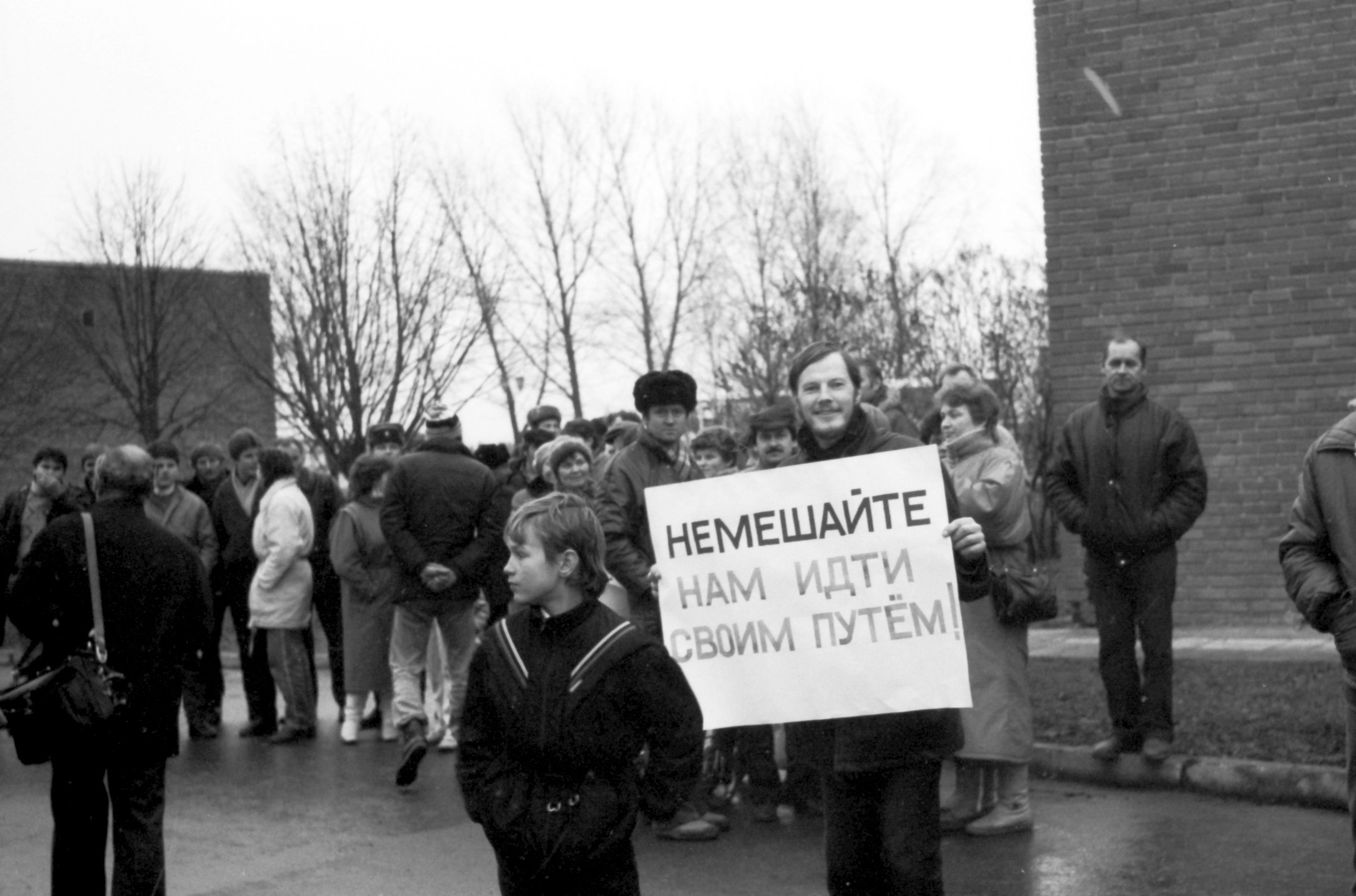
A meeting of protesters in Bridai, Šiauliai district, during Gorbachev's visit to Lithuania in January 1990. The poster in Russian reads "Let us go our way!"

On 7 February 1990, following the Soviet parliament's findings on the Molotov–Ribbentrop pact, Lithuania announced that the declaration that had had Lithuania join the USSR did not represent the will of Lithuanians and was therefore void. A month later, on 11 March, Lithuania became the first republic to assert its independence from the USSR. The timing aimed to preempt the election of the president of the Soviet Union, scheduled on 15 March. When Vilnius sent an invitation to the Kremlin to begin negotiations related to the restoration of independence the next day, the Soviet leadership was infuriated. It demanded that the Lithuanian Supreme Council repeal the Act of the Re-Establishment of the State of Lithuania, but Lithuania rejected the request and its leader, Vytautas Landsbergis, appealed to the "democratic nations" to recognise the country's independence. Gorbachev later warned, in an attempt to dissuade Lithuania from secession, that if Lithuania were to do so, the Soviet Union would claim Vilnius and Klaipėda, which were not part of Lithuania at the time the Molotov–Ribbentrop pact was signed. The theme would recur in Gorbachev's later speeches and in maps circulated among Byelorussian officials.

Lithuanians argued that since Lithuania claimed state continuity and since the Soviet occupation was illegal, the negotiations could only happen based on international law, but the Soviets saw it as an attempt to secede, which they said was only subject to Union's regulations. Article 72 of the 1977 Constitution did provide for the right of a Soviet republic to secede, but Soviet authorities were not intent at letting it happen so easily. The 3rd session of the Congress of People's Deputies ruled the independence declaration to be unconstitutional and declared any unilateral declarations of independence void until a law regulating secession was adopted. When it was passed on 3 April, the terms set in the document proved virtually impossible to implement. (Note: According to the law (in Russian), a Union or autonomous republic could only secede if (a) it achieved a two-thirds majority in a referendum six to nine months after the signatures were collected, (b) it got consent from the USSR's Congress of People's Deputies to begin transition, (c) it waited for up to five years, during which period it transferred the Union's property to the Soviet Union, unless the sides agreed otherwise, (d) it survived a confirmatory referendum (2/3 majority needed) if it was called in the last year of transition and (e) the Congress of People's Deputies voted to confirm that interests of all sides had been satisfied during the transitionary period and ratified the secession. No republic has ultimately undergone such procedure before breaking away from USSR.) Landsbergis' government promptly responded with a letter which asserted that the resolution of the Congress of People's Deputies was illegal and insisted on talks on equal footing between the USSR and Lithuania. A proposal by President George H. W. Bush to calm the situation by organising an independence referendum was firmly rejected by the Soviets.

In late March, the Soviet government ordered to reinforce troops in Lithuania, introduced about 100 tanks and 1,500 soldiers to the streets of Vilnius, and captured some strategic buildings, including the prosecutor's office, the Vilnius Airport, the Party Historical Institute, the headquarters of the Communist Party of Lithuania, and printing offices of the main newspapers and journals of the republic. Additionally, Gorbachev issued a decree that:

- ordered KGB officers to enhance surveillance of Lithuania's borders (which also involved closing the only border crossing with Poland on 3 April),
- mandated surrender of hunting rifles by the population,
- ordered all foreigners (including diplomats and journalists) to leave the region.

Gorbachev still sought to reach a compromise with Lithuanians by secretly negotiating with Algirdas Brazauskas, who by then had become deputy prime minister of Lithuania; however, the Soviet leader backtracked after Brazauskas demanded an exorbitant sum as compensation. Meanwhile, the Soviets were rapidly losing control as Lithuanians were sabotaging conscription to the Soviet Armed Forces, refused to acknowledge Soviet officials sent from Moscow, and started issuing their own identification documents.

== Blockade ==
On 13 April, Gorbachev and Nikolai Ryzhkov (USSR's prime minister) issued an ultimatum to Lithuania, demanding that the country revoke the independence declaration and restore the supremacy of the Soviet laws within two days, and threatening an embargo on produce paid for by freely convertible currency if it refused. Hardliners within the CPSU were nudging towards a coup d'état; initially, Gorbachev was open to consider such a scenario, but later dismissed such calls. Gorbachev also reportedly thought about a full-scale military invasion or assumption of direct control of Lithuania from Moscow, but ultimately also dismissed these ideas. Therefore, Gorbachev decided to try an economic blockade instead, hoping to instigate a popular revolt against the Lithuanian leadership and force it into rescinding the independence declaration. This solution, as formalised in an order of the USSR Council of Ministers on 17 April, was chosen despite the fact that just the previous month, Yuri Maslyukov (director of Gosplan, the Soviet central planning committee) had assured the government that an embargo would not happen, as he thought it would be too detrimental to both sides.

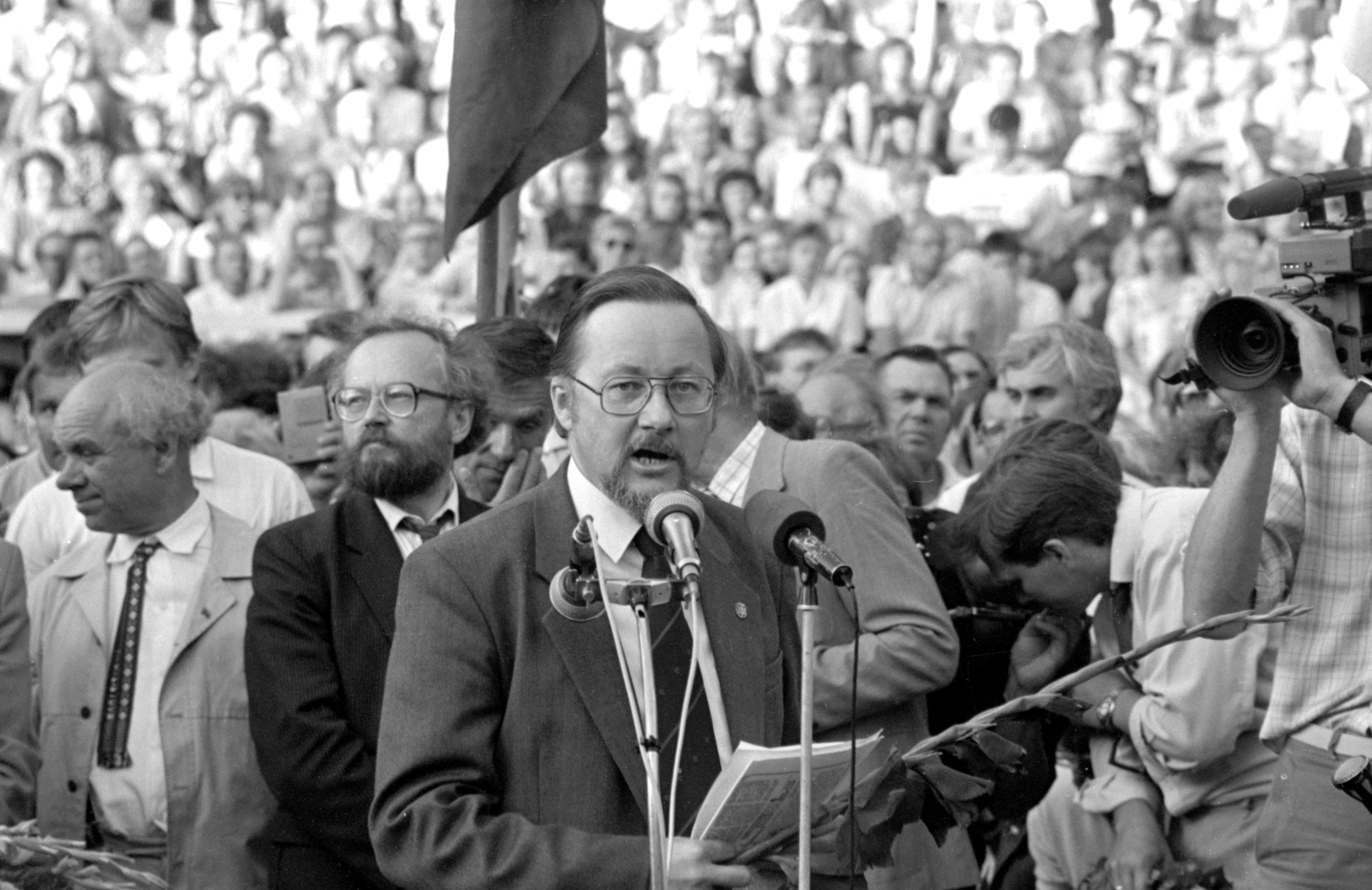
Vytautas Landsbergis, chair of the Supreme Council of Lithuania (Reconstituent Seimas) in 1990–1992 and leader of Lithuania

Lithuania did not respond within the time allocated; however, on 18 April, the Supreme Council of Lithuania tried to prevent the embargo with a declaration whereby it voluntarily refrained from adopting new laws, pending what Lithuanian officials called "preliminary consultations" between Lithuania and the Soviet Union. The Soviets were unimpressed, and on 18 April, at 21:25 (EEST), the Kremlin launched the blockade by stopping supplies to the Mažeikiai oil refinery.

Initially, the supply of 40–60 types of raw materials and other products were cut off. Notably, the supply of oil was halted and gas deliveries decreased by 84%. The USSR also suspended the movement of goods and restricted sales of fuel. The blockade worsened a few days later, when the USSR stopped supplying coal, electricity, paper, foodstuffs, and pharmaceuticals, including the most essential drugs and vaccines for hospitals. Additionally, the Soviet Union also limited access to the port in Klaipėda and blocked Lithuania's bank accounts. Borders were closed and foreigners forbidden from entering. The military took control of some of the printing offices.

Almost immediately, the embargo impacted the everyday lives of citizens. Prices in the shops jumped around threefold, that assuming there was anything to buy at all. This was exacerbated by delays in paying salaries and rationing of basic foodstuffs. Kommersant reported that a canister of petrol, which would cost 8 roubles in normal times, spiked to 50 roubles in less than a week, though some Lithuanians say petrol prices stayed at the usual rate of 20–30 kopecks per litre. Whatever the case, gasoline was rationed to 20 litres per person, and queues to petrol stations reached several kilometres in length. Public transport was forced to reduce the frequency of service. As electricity and paper were lacking, broadcasting and newspaper printing were also limited.

According to M. Gaškienė, who was responsible for coordination of food supply chains within Lithuania, the only factories which were not impacted by the effects of embargo were the ones that still were under direct control of the Soviet Union. That said, the embargo still damaged the Soviets, as hundreds of Soviet-owned enterprises had difficulties to operate in blockade conditions. In particular, some of the exports that were primarily produced in Lithuania (such as vacuum cleaner parts, pneumatic brakes, TV tubes, and black boxes) could not be brought back to the Soviet Union. Also, as the Mažeikiai oil refinery, which has not received any loads of oil, had to stop its operations, not only could the Soviet Union not extract profits from oil products, but also, oil supply was cut for Kaliningrad Oblast, which effectively became an exclave of the USSR between Lithuania and Poland. Electricity supply that would normally flow through Lithuania was also severed.

=== Political negotiations ===
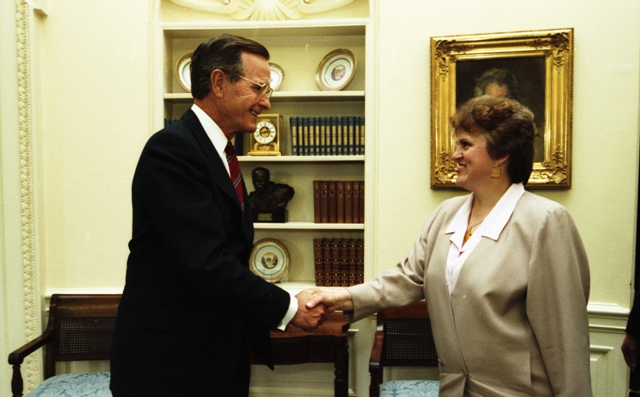
Kazimira Prunskienė, prime minister of Lithuania (right), meeting President George H. W. Bush (left) in the White House on 3 May

Soviet efforts to isolate Lithuania's problem from the world and to undermine confidence in the cause for independence largely backfired. While support for Landsbergis dropped from 45% to 28% during the months of the blockade, people became even more united in opposition to the Soviet Union. Stasis Žemaitis, a worker from Marijampolė, committed self-immolation in protest of the embargo.

Western countries' reaction, however, was rather cool. On 20 April, François Mitterrand, President of France, and Helmut Kohl, Chancellor of Germany, urged Lithuania to temporarily suspend the independence restoration process and asked to negotiate with Moscow. Meanwhile, the then prime minister Kazimira Prunskienė visited Oslo, Copenhagen, Stockholm, and Ottawa, seeking economic and political support. On 3 May, she met President George H. W. Bush and then, from 9 to 11 May, she talked to the prime minister of the United Kingdom Margaret Thatcher, Mitterrand, and Kohl. American and British leaders expressed only limited support for Lithuanians and urged to look for a compromise with the Soviets. Lithuanian officials were accepted warmly, but only as private guests.

Such reticence to openly support Lithuania in its independence movements was explained by several factors. Western leaders generally feared destabilisation of the situation in the Soviet Union and wanted Gorbachev in office, as the West perceived him as a friendly ruler and a guarantor for democratic transition in Eastern Europe. The West also felt that Gorbachev was the key person in negotiations of arms control treaties and trade agreements, on which Gorbachev has put strong emphasis. In addition to that, particular interests of European rulers of the Western world also distracted from the Lithuanian problem. Chancellor Kohl wanted to successfully reunify Germany, which needed good relations with the Soviet Union, while President Mitterrand aimed to maintain friendly relations with Germany to facilitate negotiations over reforming the European Economic Community, which would eventually become the European Union. Thatcher did not seem particularly interested in this event. Ultimately these countries distanced themselves from the Lithuanian crisis.

As for the United States, the United States House of Representatives urged Bush to recognise Lithuania's independence and a group of nine senators accused him of applying double standards when treating the Lithuanian issue, but President Bush suggested there was no constructive role the United States could have in the process and refused to mediate the conflict. All of that happened despite the longstanding policy of non-recognition of occupation of Baltic states and amid several violations of international and Soviet law. Internally, however, the Bush administration decided to postpone trade normalisation with the Soviet Union until Gorbachev lifted the blockade of Lithuania.

More friendly attitudes were exhibited in Poland, with government delegations being accepted according to the official protocol for foreign dignitaries. Poland offered mediation in the conflict that started since 11 March and even signed an economic agreement with Lithuania on 30 May, but that country still fell short of recognising Lithuania's restoration of independence, fearing retribution from USSR.

The Landsbergis government initially insisted that the independence restoration act could not be subject to negotiations, while the Soviet side demanded that it be annulled before any discussion could occur. However, on German and French advice, when Prunskienė met with Gorbachev on 17 May, she announced that the independence restoration process could be suspended, which TASS, the Soviet state news agency, suggested was the minimum requirement for the negotiations to start. Six days later, the Lithuanian parliament adopted a resolution which suspended all laws adopted after 11 March which were related to the subject of negotiations, but the Soviets were not content with the concessions and the blockade continued.

=== Lifting the embargo ===
By June, the situation favoured setting some compromise. Lithuania was exhausted by the blockade, which forced factories to close. The general populace had to deal with food and energy shortages. Moreover, regular visits of the Lithuania's prime minister gradually led the Lithuanian leadership to believe that temporary suspension of the restoration act was inevitable to reduce tensions.

Problems were also appearing in the Soviet Union. On 30 May, Leningrad City Council urged the central government to begin negotiations with the republic under blockade, and Moldavian SSR voted to recognise the independence of Lithuania the following day. However, it was Boris Yeltsin who made the largest impact. Two days after his election as chairman of the Supreme Soviet of the RSFSR, the main constituent republic of the Soviet Union and the one that included Kaliningrad Oblast, Yeltsin met with representatives of the Baltic republics, including Landsbergis, pledging support for their independence cause. Then, on 12 June, the RSFSR declared itself a sovereign state within USSR, and, in its declared capacity as a sovereign republic, announced it would not enforce the blockade. Meanwhile, the United States Congress tied the trade normalisation to the resolution of the blockade in Lithuania, which created further pressure to resolve the issue.

On 16 June, the Soviets increased the flow of gas from 15% to 30% of the level before the blockade and let some deliveries of raw materials in, which enabled partial reopening of some industrial plants, including Jonava's fertilizer facility. They also pledged to grant statehood to Lithuania 2–3 years after they froze the declaration of independence. From the Lithuanian side, Landsbergis, who had insisted that the Act of Restoration of Independence was non-negotiable, now recommended a motion to the Seimas to suspend the effects of the Act.

After two weeks of discussions, on 29 June, the Supreme Council of Lithuania declared a 100-day moratorium on the "legal actions arising from" (Lithuanian: iš jo kylančius teisinius veiksmus) the 11 March declaration of restoration of Lithuania, which was to take effect once the negotiations with the Soviet Union started. The declaration did not constitute the moratorium on independence itself, but this time, the Kremlin decided to enter into negotiations with Lithuania. Oil deliveries were resumed by the evening of 30 June, while on 2 July, the blockade was fully lifted, which Nikolai Ryzhkov, Chairman of USSR's Council of Ministers, confirmed the following day. Finally, on 6 July, Soviet diplomatic agencies could grant visas to foreigners travelling to Lithuania again, and on 7 July, the rail connections between USSR and Lithuania were fully restored.

== Impacts ==
=== Economic ===
The blockade stunned Lithuanians, who were not expecting such a strong reaction from the Soviet Union. According to Martha Olcott, who was writing for the Foreign Affairs on the topic, of all the scenarios that Gorbachev was considering, it was the economic blockade that Sąjūdis was afraid of the most. Lithuania's economy was tightly integrated in the USSR's and, while relatively developed, was still subordinated to the needs of the Soviet Union and was using little local input as a result. The other 14 republics were the destination of most exports (94.3% in 1990) and the origin of most imports (87.7% in 1990). Lithuania was even more dependent on energy resources, with total dependence on gas from the Soviet Union and only minuscule internal production of oil.

According to Lithuanian estimates, by the end of the blockade, 415.5 million roubles worth of production were lost, and the Lithuanian budget suffered a shortfall of 125 million roubles. (For comparison, the annual budgetary expenditures of the Lithuanian SSR in 1989 reached 4,626 million roubles). Hufbauer et al., who wrote a book evaluating the success of economic blockades, estimated the direct consequences of the blockade to cost Lithuania 1.5% of GNP. The exact number of laid-off workers is unknown but estimates vary from 26,000 to 50,000 people; Stanley Vardys, a researcher of 20th-century Lithuania, says that 35,000 lost their jobs, while idle workers were paid salaries from the Lithuanian government, which widened its budget deficit.

As the blockade meant a scarcity of important resources, Lithuania, which was transitioning to a market-oriented economy, was forced to centralise its management and to strongly regulate its economy in order to avoid exhausting supplies and to shield the consumers from price increases. This postponed some free market reforms, particularly in comparison to Latvia and Estonia. On the long term, however, it helped the country prioritise trade deals with other countries and made the enterprises seek cooperation from other entities than the government, thereby realigning the economy towards the Western model. For example, Juozas Olekas, then-Health Minister of Lithuania, noted that the country lacked medical supplies, but managed to establish a good relationship with Denmark, thanks to which the shortage of vaccines for hospitals was largely alleviated. The government of Lithuania and local industries started to actively search for direct relations with the enterprises (which were not subject to embargo), often engaging in barter trade with oil-rich republics (e.g. oil for butter or meat), such as the RSFSR and the Kazakh SSR. The blockade's effects were also somewhat mitigated by smugglers operating on Lithuania's borders, as well as by the regiments of the Soviet Army stationing in the country, which were clandestinely selling the reserves of oil products they had in the garrisons.

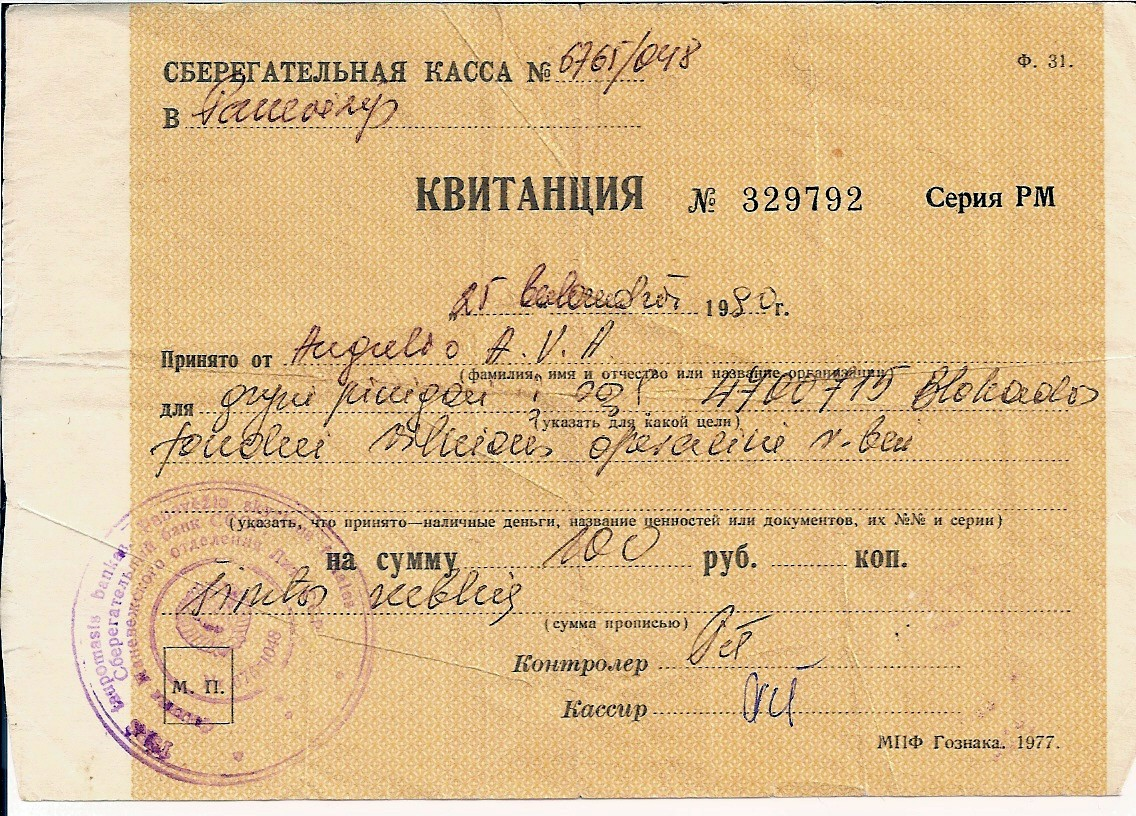
A 100-rouble donation to the Blockade Fund of Lithuania, 25 April 1990

In response to the blockade, the government created a so-called Blockade Fund, which operated on voluntary donations of Lithuanians. By the time the blockade ended, 7.6 million roubles were collected by the government, which it promptly invested in jewellery and gold to avoid depreciation of the roubles they received. In Suwałki voivodeship, the Lithuanians, who are a sizeable minority in the border area, have also contributed to the effort.

The embargo had profound effects on the energy sector of Lithuania. In Soviet times, geologists drilled the ground for the search of oil in Latvia and Lithuania, but the economic blockade forced Lithuania to extract it for the first time on an industrial scale – in 1990, Lithuanians had pumped out 12,000 tons of the fossil fuel. Moreover, the Baltic country could not import oil by the sea not only because of the naval blockade, but also because Klaipėda's oil terminal was far too small for the needs of Lithuania. That prompted the government to build a new oil terminal in Būtingė, which was commissioned in 1998, along with continuation of the oil pipe to the new sea port.

=== Latvia and Estonia ===
The Soviet crackdown on Lithuania accelerated integration of the three Baltic states and created a form of solidarity between the pro-independence parties in the three republics. A series of high-profile meetings occurred between the leaders of Lithuania, Latvia, and Estonia. Already, in May, the three states signed an agreement which renewed the so-called Baltic Entente, an interwar treaty which sought political coordination, and established a Council of Baltic States, essentially having the same purpose. On the other hand, the economic sanctions had a chilling effect on the independence cause of the two other Baltic states, which, because of the tough reaction of the Kremlin and their larger share of ethnic minorities, particularly Russians, decided to water down their declarations of independence and generally sought less confrontational attitudes towards Moscow.

=== Rising tensions with the minorities ===
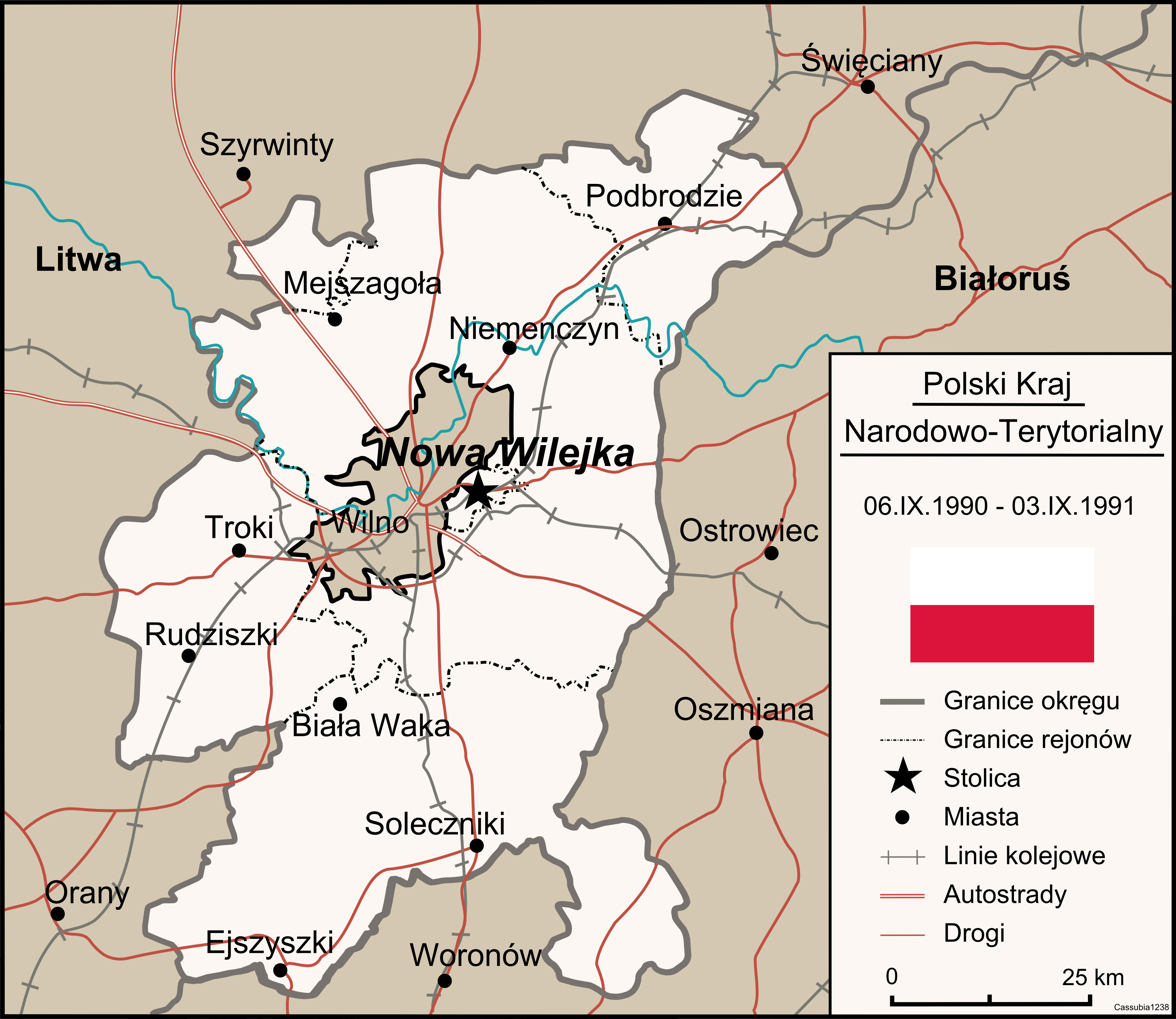
Map of the Polish National-Territorial Region, as proclaimed by Lithuanian Poles in October 1990. It included the districts of Vilnius, Šalčininkai, as well as parts of Trakai, Švenčionys and Širvintos districts. The capital was established at Naujoji Vilnia. The city of Vilnius was not part of the region, thus becoming an enclave within the proposed autonomy.

At the same time as the relations with the Soviet Union deteriorated, the conflict was brewing between the Lithuanian majority and the Polish minority in the south-eastern part of Lithuania and the Russians in Sniečkus, where the Ignalina Nuclear Power Plant was located. Several times in 1990 and 1991, local governments of these areas sought autonomy and/or tried to assert that Lithuania's laws did not extend to them.

The tensions were particularly strong with the Polish minority, which felt discriminated against by Lithuanians, not least due to few educational and economical opportunities in the area and the official language policy of Lithuania, which mandated the use of Lithuanian in state buildings without exceptions for minorities. While the first attempts to introduce Polish self-government (or autonomy) started in late 1988 and early 1989, the movement gained significant momentum after the Act of 11 March, and its escalation happened during the blockade. On 15 May, the Šalcininkai district council voted to disregard the independence declaration and to recognise the Soviet Constitution and Soviet laws only; the Vilnius district council was less radical, but on 24 May, it still voted to create a Polish national district and to condemn Lithuania for what the council saw as a violation of human rights and ignoring national minorities' interests. Czesław Wysocki, head of the Šalčininkai district council, would explain that the CPSU, unlike Lithuania, endorsed creation of such entities; he went on to claim that the only way to alleviate tensions was to cancel the independence declaration. Both decisions were eventually cancelled by the Supreme Council of Lithuania as unconstitutional. However, on 1 June, delegates from majority-Polish regions appealed to the Lithuanian government, not the Soviet Union, to create a self-governing entity, which they argued was the only way to ensure that the rights of Poles are respected. Further preparations eventually led to the announcement of the Polish National-Territorial Region in October 1990, which the politicians wanted to be part of Lithuania.

Opinions differ on the role of Poles in the process of Lithuanian struggle for independence and in the blockade. Lithuanian, Russian, and Western scholars state that Poles were tacitly or directly supported by Moscow and were dominated by pro-Moscow politicians, such as Jan Ciechanowicz and Wysocki. Sąjūdis claimed that Poles have been manipulated by Moscow communists, which led the party to adopt anti-Polish rhetoric. Winston A. Van Horne and Alfred Erich Senn suggest that Moscow helped the Polish regions weather the blockade (though M. Gaškienė, a senior government official, wrote to Algimantas Gureckas that the blockade was applied uniformly across Lithuania), while Anatol Lieven underlines that the Association of Poles in Lithuania actually supported independence, but faced stiff competition from Polish anti-independence candidates. On the other hand, Polish scholars and members of the Polish community say the Polish-Communist ties are either an exaggeration or Lithuanian propaganda.

== Aftermath ==
As Lithuania and the Soviet Union found a compromise upon which negotiations could start, committees on both sides were set up to agree on the terms of further co-existence. Landsbergis, who was considered less reconciliatory than Prunskienė, was head of the Lithuanian delegation, and Ryzhkov led the Soviet one. Even though the committees were set in July, the negotiations were not agreed upon until October. When the groups were supposed to meet on 30 November 1990, the Soviet delegation refused to attend, citing preparations for the 4th session of the Congress of People's Deputies, and no date for a new meeting was set. The Lithuanians then cancelled the moratorium, restoring the effects of the Act of 11 March, which served as a catalyst to the January Events of 1991. Soviet aggression against Lithuania's border posts continued further until the failed coup in August 1991. By this time, Lithuanian independence was internationally recognised (including by the Russian SFSR and the Soviet Union itself).
