= Palanga City Municipality =

Palanga City Municipality Palangos miesto savivaldybė
- City municipality
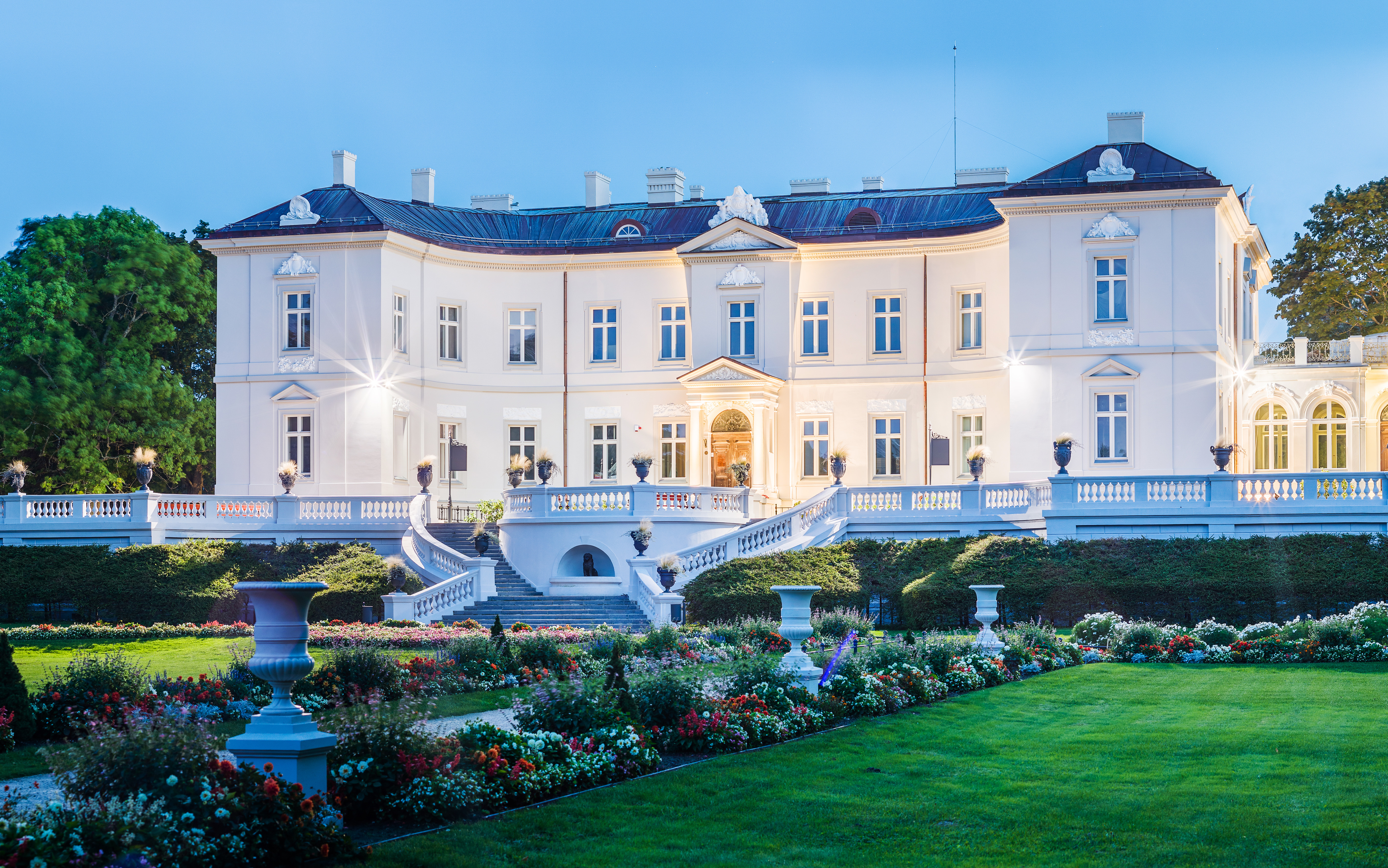
- The Tiškevičiai Palace houses the Amber Museum

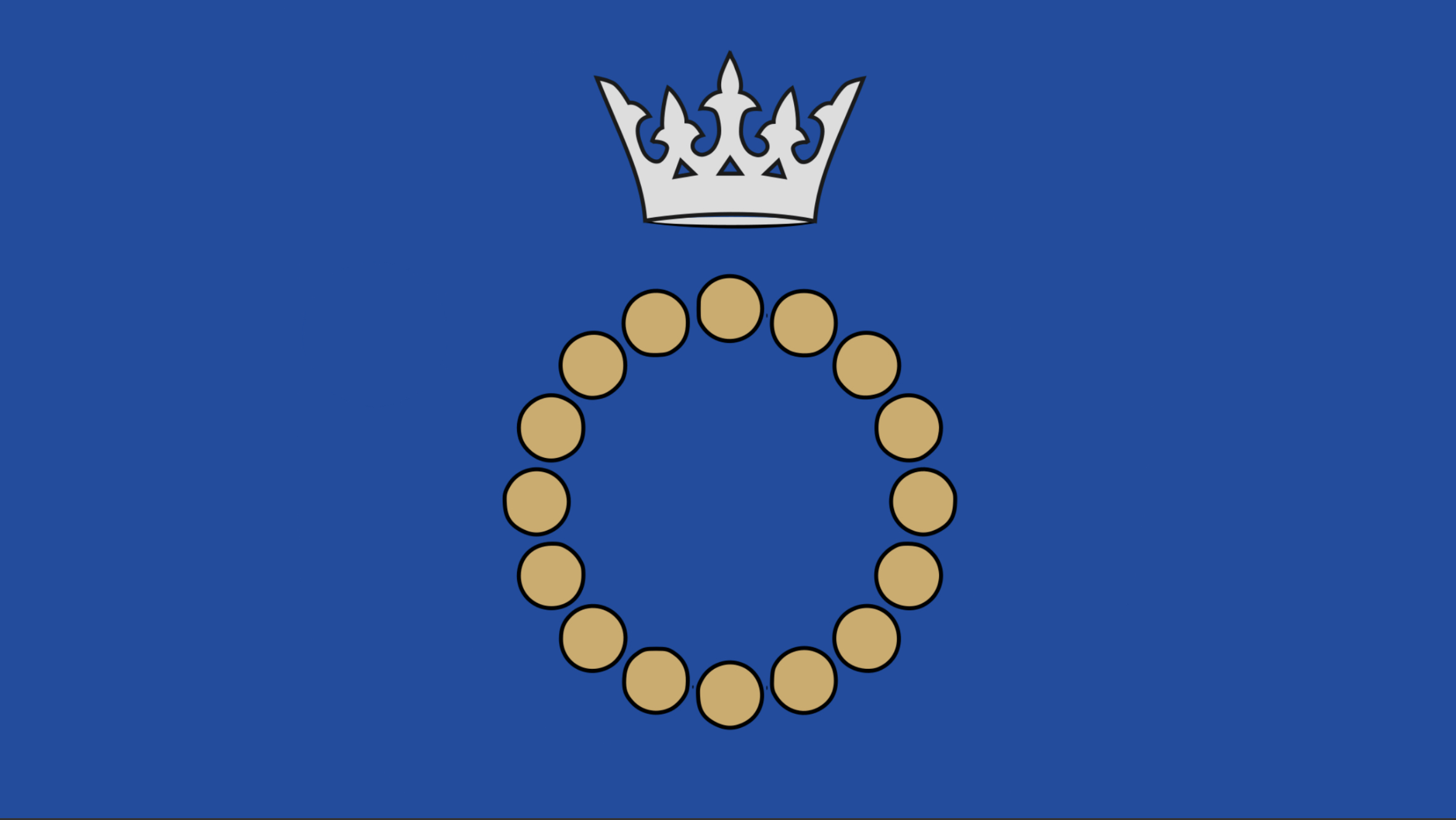
- Flag Coat of arms
- Nickname: Vasaros sostinė (Summer Capital)
- Location of Palanga
- Coordinates: 55°55′N 21°4′E
- Country: Lithuania
- Ethnographic region: Samogitia
- County: Klaipėda County
- First mentioned: 1161
- Granted city rights: 1791
- Elderships: Šventoji eldership

Area
  - Total: 79 km^{2} (31 sq mi)
- Elevation: 7 m (23 ft)

Population (2021)
  - Total: 16,746
  - Density: 210/km^{2} (550/sq mi)
- Time zone: UTC+2 (EET)
  - Summer (DST): UTC+3 (EEST)
- Postal code: LT-00001
- Dialing code: 370
- Website: http://www.palanga.lt

Palanga City Municipality is a city municipality of Lithuania, located in the north-west of the country, near the Baltic Sea. It includes Palanga, Šventoji, and Būtingė. It is located in Klaipėda County.

== History ==
Since 1970, most of Šventoji surroundings added to Palanga municipality. The municipality in its current form was created in 1995.

== Elderships ==
A single eldership within municipality – Šventoji eldership, located in Šventoji, 14 km north of Palanga.

== Settlements ==
- Būtingė
- Palanga - city proper
- Šventoji
