= Būtingė oil terminal =

Lithuanian Oil Terminal

Coordinates: 56°3′35″N 21°6′27″E

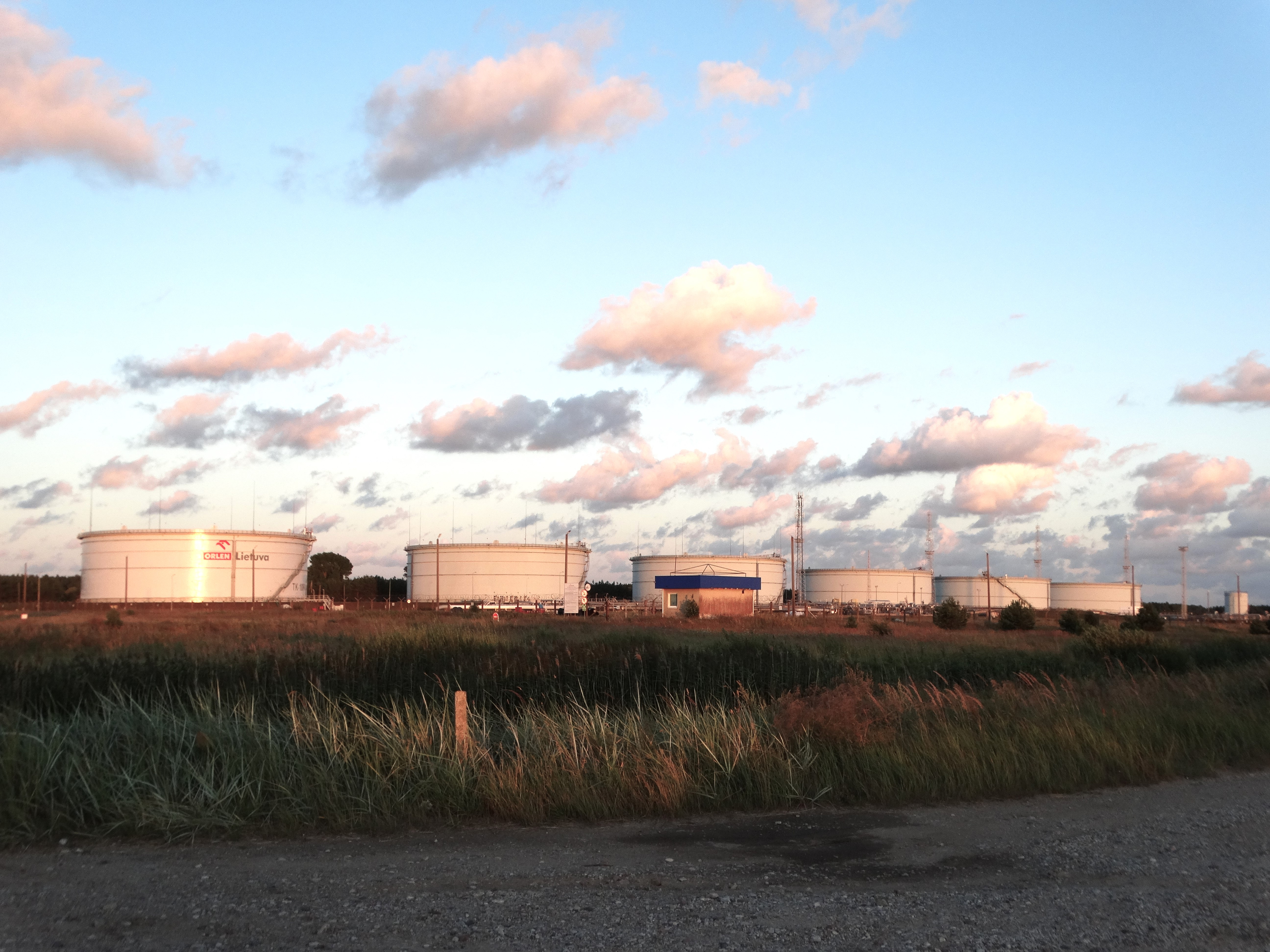
Būtingė oil tanks, 2022

Būtingė oil terminal (Lithuanian: Būtingės naftos terminalas) is an oil terminal near the village of Būtingė in Palanga, 00316 Palanga City Municipality, northern Lithuania. Planned, designed and implemented by Fluor Corporation, it is a part of ORLEN Lietuva (formerly Mažeikių Nafta). Būtingė has been in operation since July 1999, and is the first major petroleum project that Lithuania implemented after it attained independence in 1990. The facilities can accommodate crude oil exports of 8 million tons and imports to the extent of 6 to 8 million tons.

== Location ==
The oil terminal is situated in the municipality of Palanga, on the coast of the Baltic Sea, close to the border with Latvia. It lies near the mouth of the Šventoji River. The project, the first of its kind on this coast, sits on 1,239 hectares on the Baltic Sea coast north of the port of Klaipėda.

== History ==
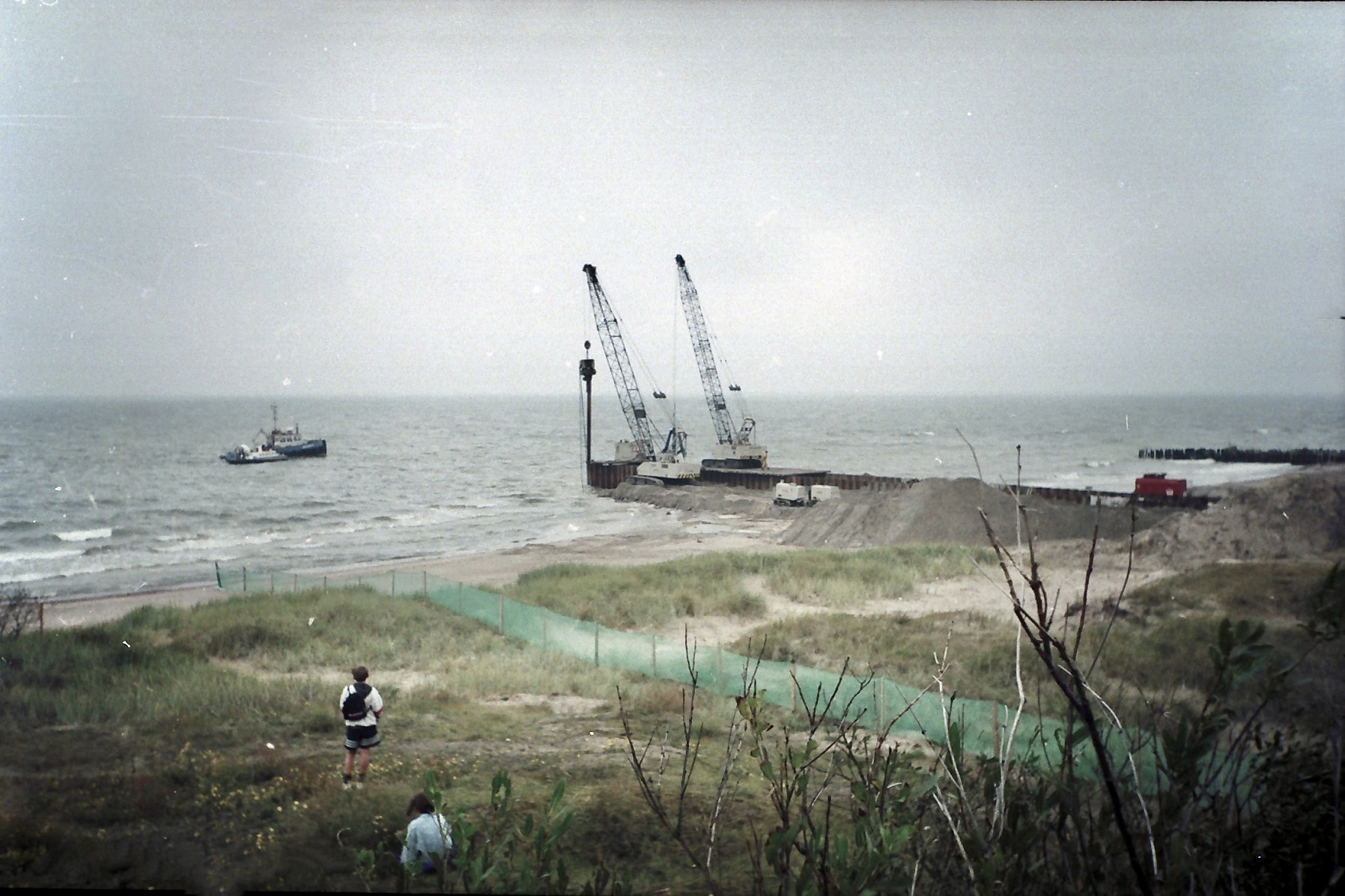
Būtingė oil terminal under construction in 1998.

The Resolution on the Approval of the Būtingė Oil Terminal Statue defines the legal framework for the oil terminal. The Būtingė facility was planned, designed and implemented by Fluor Corporation. The project was contracted by ORLEN Lietuva for US$300 million. After the EPCM (engineering, procurement, and construction management) part of the project contract was awarded, work started in July 1995 and was completed in July 1999. It became the fastest route for Russian oil exports. In 2001, Būtingė was recorded to be the "fastest growing route for Russian oil export".

The terminal is somewhat controversial because of a fear of oil spills, which have occurred. Protests took place in 1999 after an oil spill, and in November 2001 a 60-ton oil spill took place, angering environmentalists.

Since July 2006, the Būtingė oil terminal is the only way to supply ORLEN Lietuva with oil, because the Russian partner, state-controlled Lukoil corporation, has cut off the supply through the Druzhba pipeline from Russia. In spite of the cutting off of the supply pipeline by Russia and adverse weather conditions, it is reported that the terminal handled unloading of 9 million tons of crude oil during 2010, a 7% rise over the 2009 figures. It is also reported that the terminal is capable of importing nearly 12 million tons of crude oil every year and tankers have capacity of up to 150,000 tons.

== Facility ==
The refinery was planned and designed as a single-point offshore mooring with a capacity to offload up to 4932 m^{3}/h. The mooring is in the form of a floating buoy. There is a pipeline, pumping stations, and an offshore terminal. The facilities are capable of handling 8 million tons of crude oil for exports and 5 to 6 million tons for import. An offshore submarine pipeline measuring 3 feet (0.91 m) in diameter and 7.5 kilometres (4.7 mi) in length connects to the shore facilities. A 22-inch (560 mm) pipeline connects to three 50,000-cubic-metre (1,800,000 cu ft) oil storage tanks which are floating roof tanks for crude oil storage. Pumping stations and a single-point mooring terminal have also been built. Tanks for storing diesel and oil are on the roof. Pumps load crude oil to tankers and transport the same over a distance of 91.5 kilometres (56.9 mi) to the refinery of ORLEN Lietuva near Mažeikiai.
