= Mažeikiai =

- City
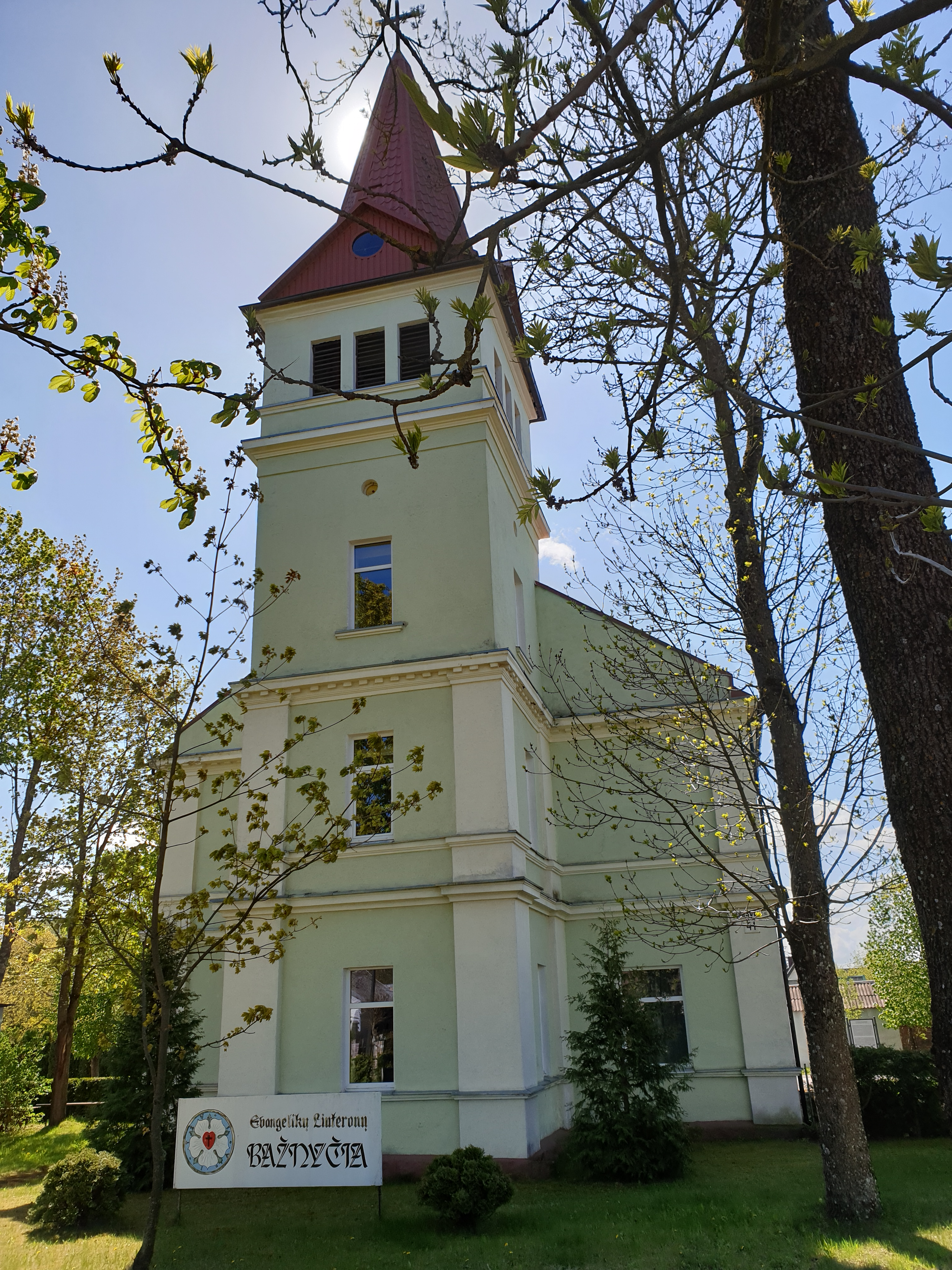
- Modern skyline of Mažeikiai Evangelical Lutheran Church Catholic Church of St. Francis of Assisi The former building of the Bank of Lithuania Mažeikiai District Municipality Building

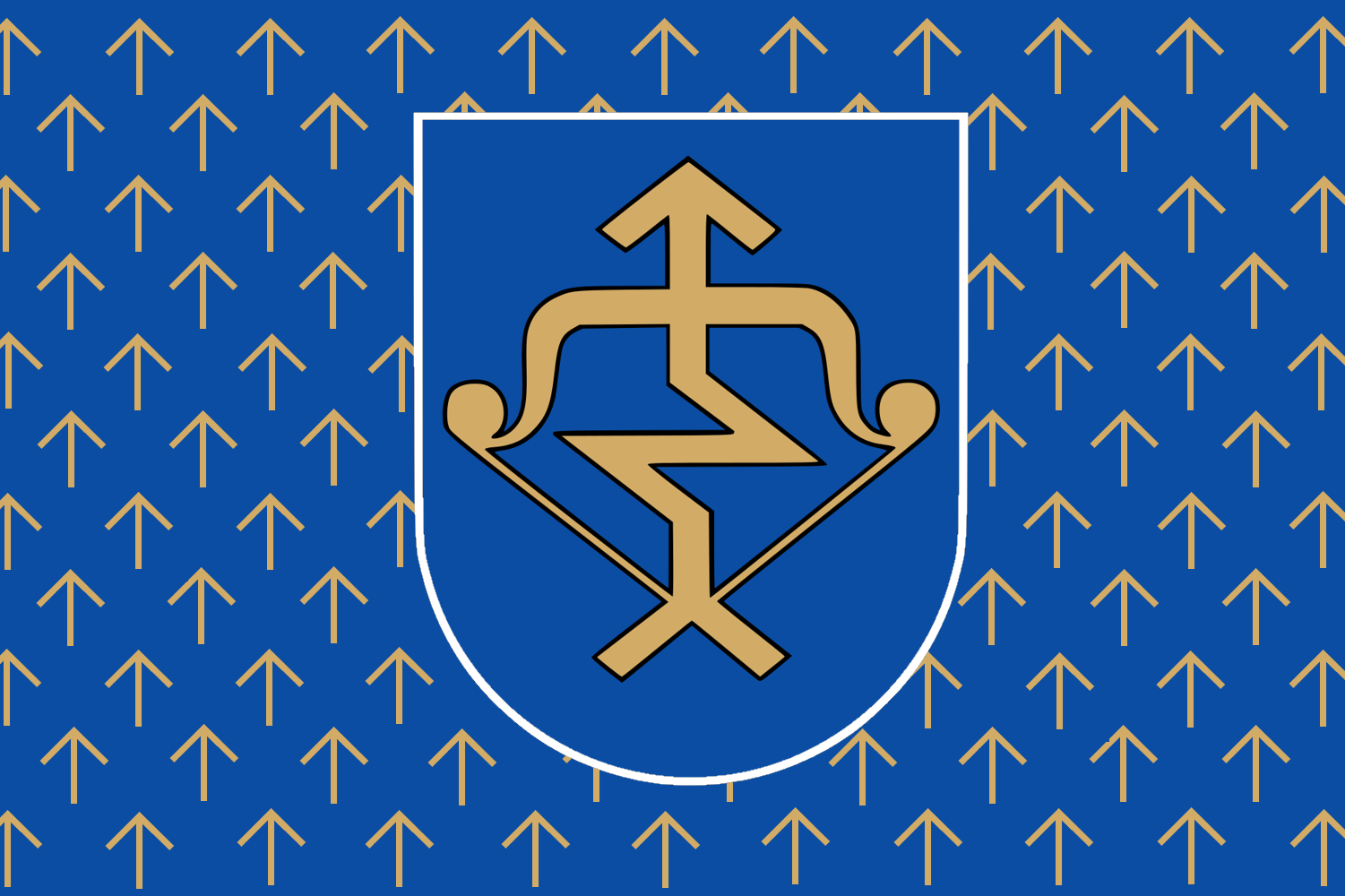
- Flag Coat of arms

- Location of Mažeikiai in Lithuania Location of Mažeikiai within the Baltics Location of Mažeikiai in Europe
- Coordinates: 56°19′N 22°20′E
- Country: Lithuania
- Ethnographic region: Samogitia
- County: Telšiai County
- Municipality: Mažeikiai district municipality
- Eldership: Mažeikiai town eldership
- Capital of: Mažeikiai district municipality Mažeikiai town eldership Mažeikiai rural eldership
- First mentioned: Sixteenth century
- Granted city rights: 1924

Area
  - Total: 16.35 km^{2} (6.31 sq mi)
- Elevation: 117 m (384 ft)

Population (2020)
  - Total: 32,470
  - Density: 1,986/km^{2} (5,144/sq mi)
- Demonym(s): Mažeikian(s) (English) mažeikiečiai (Lithuanian)
- Time zone: UTC+2 (EET)
  - Summer (DST): UTC+3 (EEST)
- Website: mazeikiai.lt

Mažeikiai (Samogitian: Mažeikē; Latvian: Mažeiķi; Polish: Możejki) is a city in northwestern Lithuania, on the Venta River. It has a population of around 32,000, making it the eighth largest city in Lithuania and eighteenth largest city in the Baltic States. The city is the administrative center of Mažeikiai District Municipality in Telšiai County. It is the largest city that does not have its own county.

== History ==
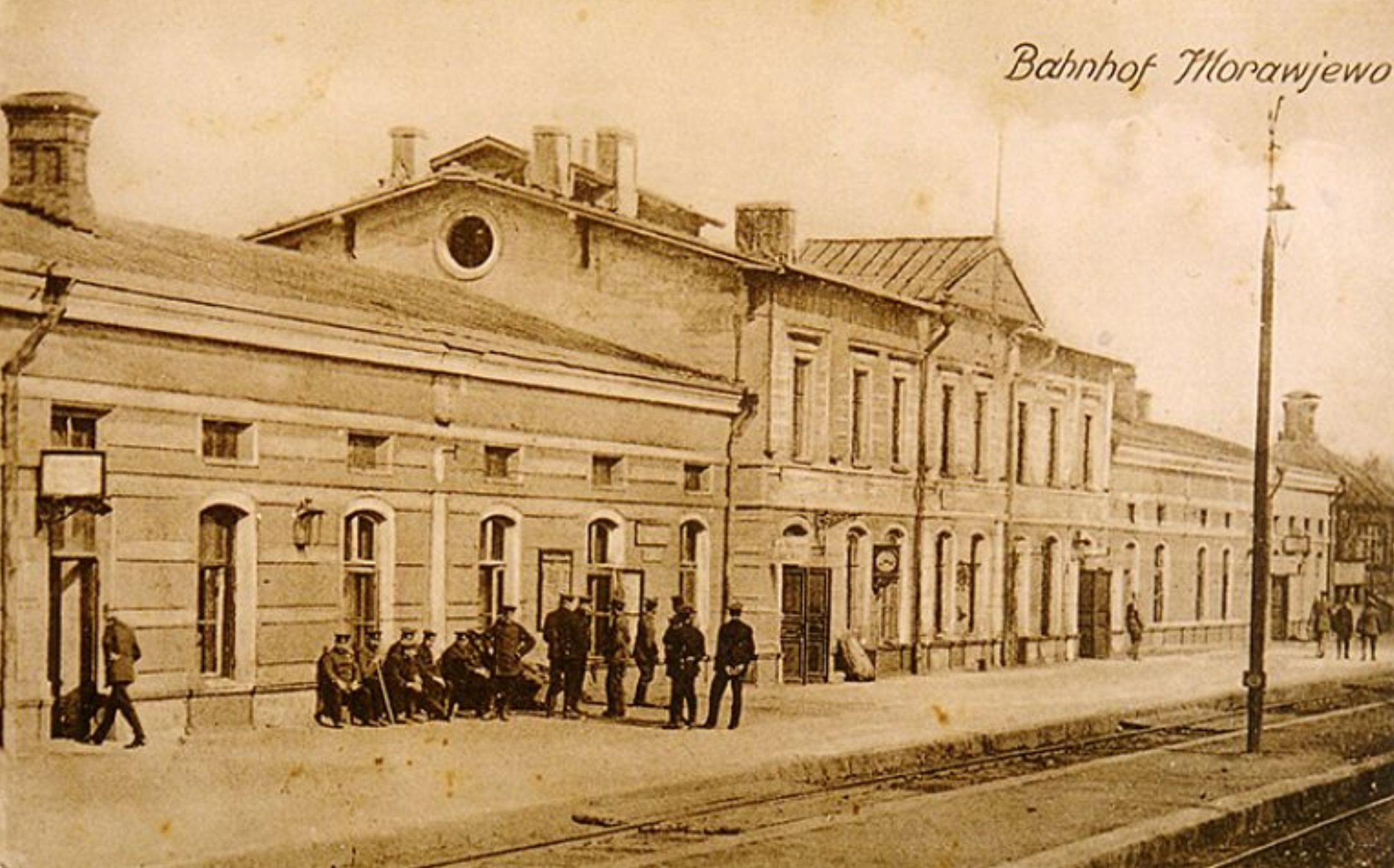
Muravyov Railway Station in 1901

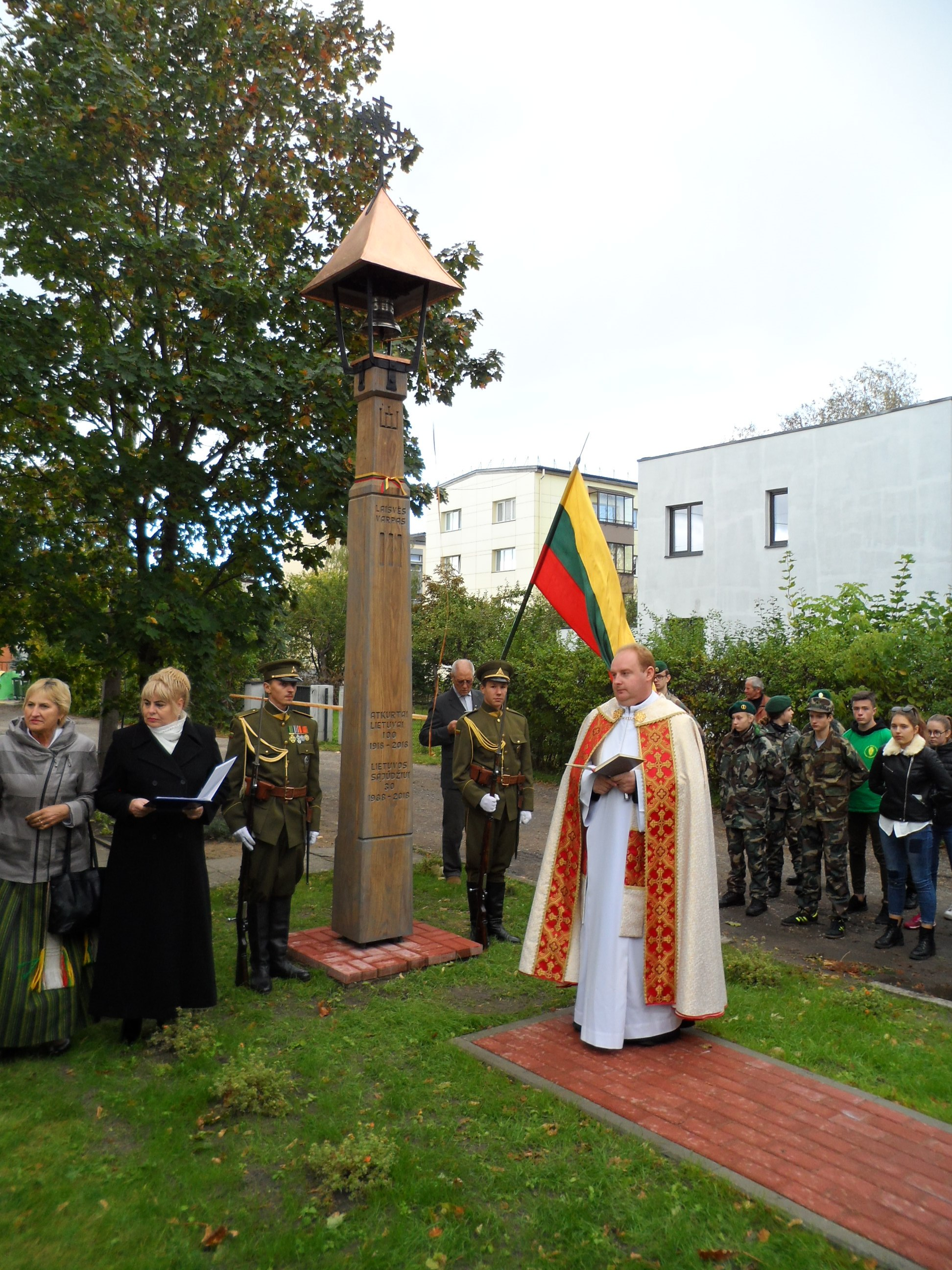
Sanctification of the Liberty Bell in 2018

Mažeikiai was first mentioned in written sources in 1335. A chronicler of the Livonian Order wrote about a campaign of the Order, during which the land of Duke Mažeika was devastated. It was located in the Duchy of Samogitia in the Grand Duchy of Lithuania within the Polish–Lithuanian Commonwealth.

The town started growing rapidly in 1869 when the Libau–Romny Railway connecting Vilnius and Liepāja was constructed. In 1893, the town had 13 shops and 5 alehouses. In 1894 an Eastern Orthodox church was built, and a synagogue had been founded several years earlier. In 1902 a Catholic church was established, followed by an Evangelical-Lutheran church in 1906. From 1899 to 1918 the town was called Muravyov.

In 1919, Mažeikiai became the county centre and received the rights of self-government. During the first years of independence, Mažeikiai was subject to a territorial dispute between Lithuania and Latvia because of its importance as a railway hub between the Latvian cities of Riga, Jelgava and Liepāja. In 1921 Latvian claims for the town were rejected by an international commission.

A hospital and a library were opened in 1922 and a museum in 1928. In 1939, the population of the town was recorded as 5,618. In 1940 26 industrial companies, 4 banks and a credit union operated in Mažeikiai.

During World War II, Mažeikiai was under occupation of Nazi Germany from 26 June 1941 until 31 October 1944. It was administered as a part of the Generalbezirk Litauen of Reichskommissariat Ostland. In August 1941, a mass killing occurred in which 4,000 Jews from the Mažeikiai district were killed.

In 1950, Mažeikiai became the district centre.

== Economy ==
In 1980 an oil refinery plant Mažeikių Nafta was opened. Today it is one of the largest industrial plants in Lithuania. In 1999, it was privatized and sold to an American company Williams International. In 2001, facing financial problems, Williams sold the refinery to Yukos. However, Yukos ran afoul with the Russian government and, facing bankruptcy, sold the refinery to PKN Orlen in 2006. In 2004, Mažeikių Nafta financed the construction of the New Church of Saint Francis of Assisi.

== Culture ==
In 1928 the Mažeikiai Museum was founded by teacher Stasys Ličkūnas. According to the official website of the Mažeikiai district municipality, the museum preserves and exhibits archaeological, historical, ethnographic, and folk art collections of the Samogitia region.

Mažeikiai has one of the largest cultural centres in Lithuania. It was established in 1946 as a culture house. In 2005 it moved to a new building which has three halls: the great hall contains 750 seats, the small hall has 250 seats, while the entertainment hall has up to 500 seats. The centre has 20 amateur art collectives.

In 1922 a public library was founded in the city. In 1975 it moved to a new three-story building. In 1976 it became a central library in the district with 21 rural and 2 urban branches.

== Twin towns – sister cities ==
Mažeikiai is twinned with:

- Havířov, Czech Republic
- Lebedyn, Ukraine
- Liezen, Austria
- Paide, Estonia
- Płock, Poland
- Saldus, Latvia
- Stendal, Germany

== Notable residents ==
- Rokas Jokubaitis (born 2000), Lithuanian basketball player for FC Bayern Munich of the Basketball Bundesliga
- Romualdas Granauskas (1939–2014), Lithuanian/Samogitian author and dramaturge

== Gallery ==
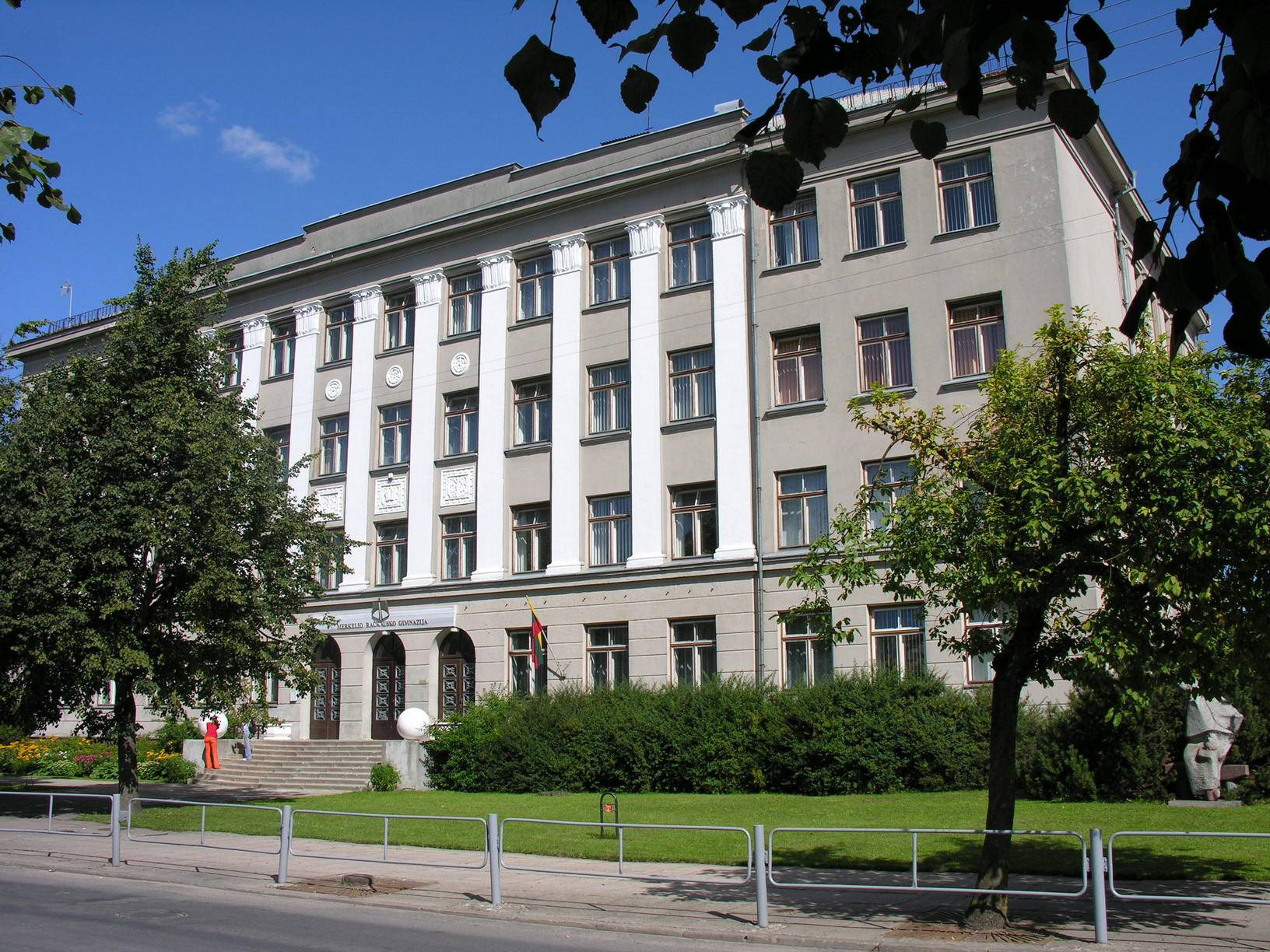
Merkelis Račkauskas gymnasium

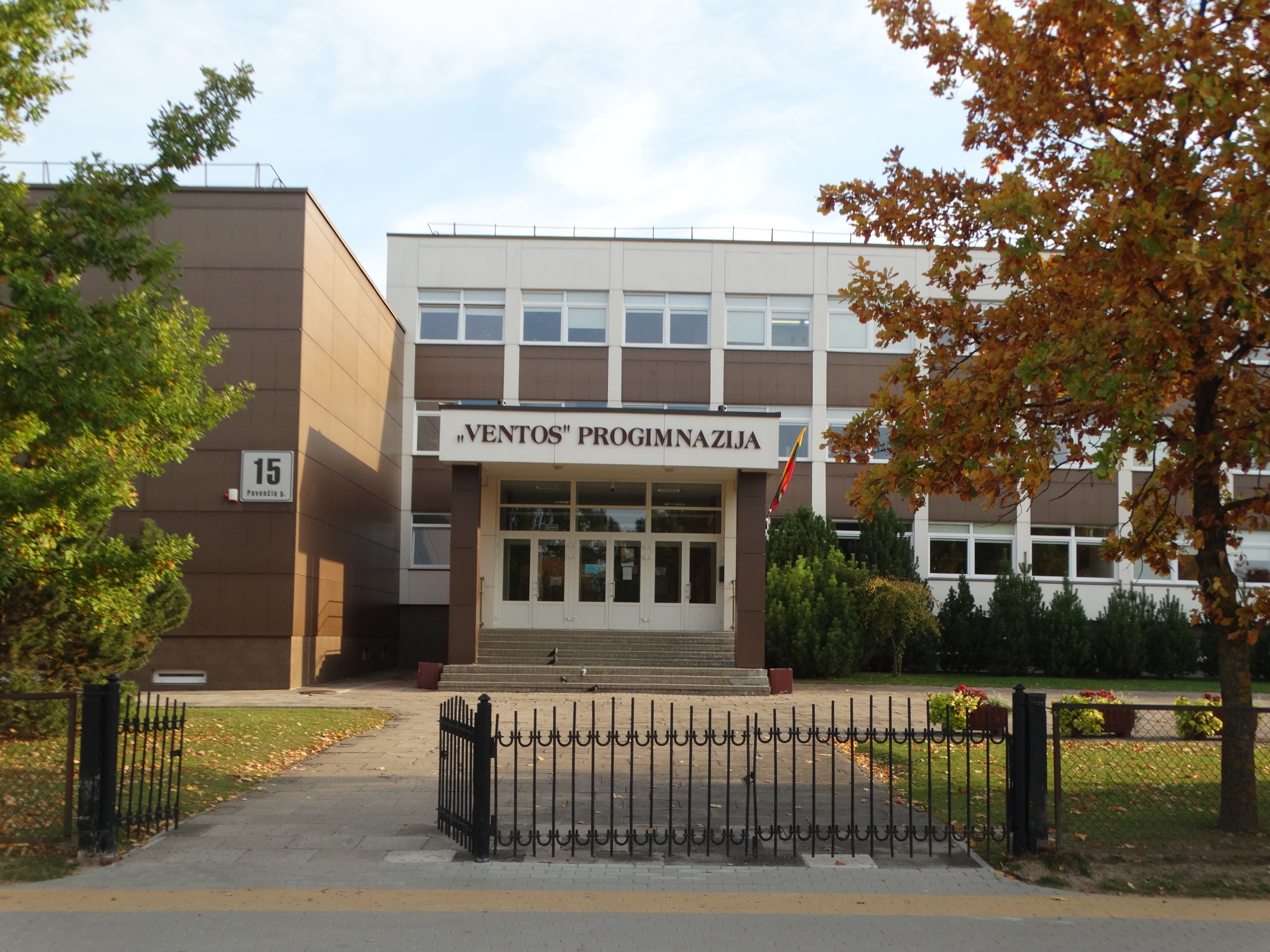
Venta gymnasium

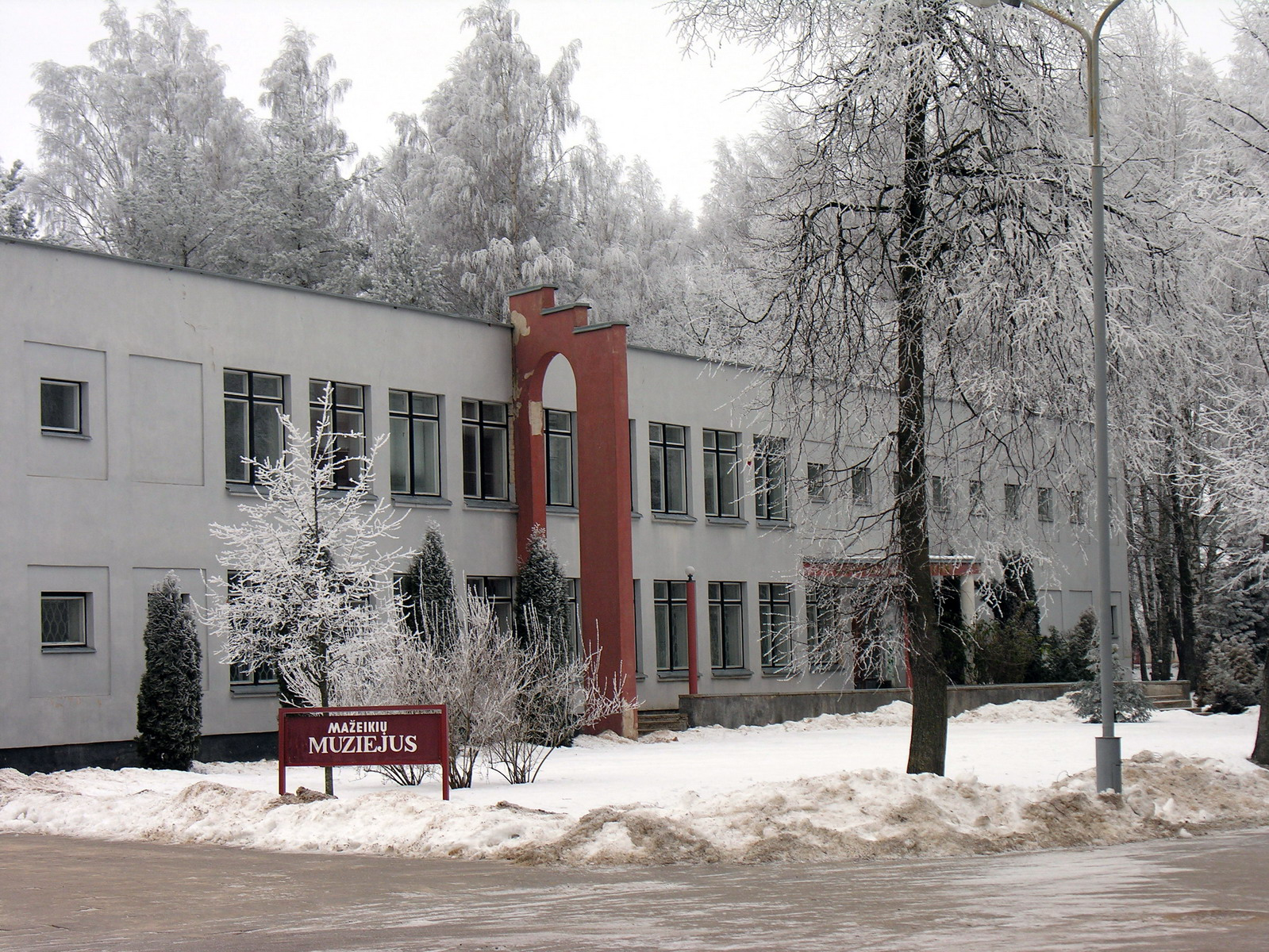
Museum of Mažeikiai

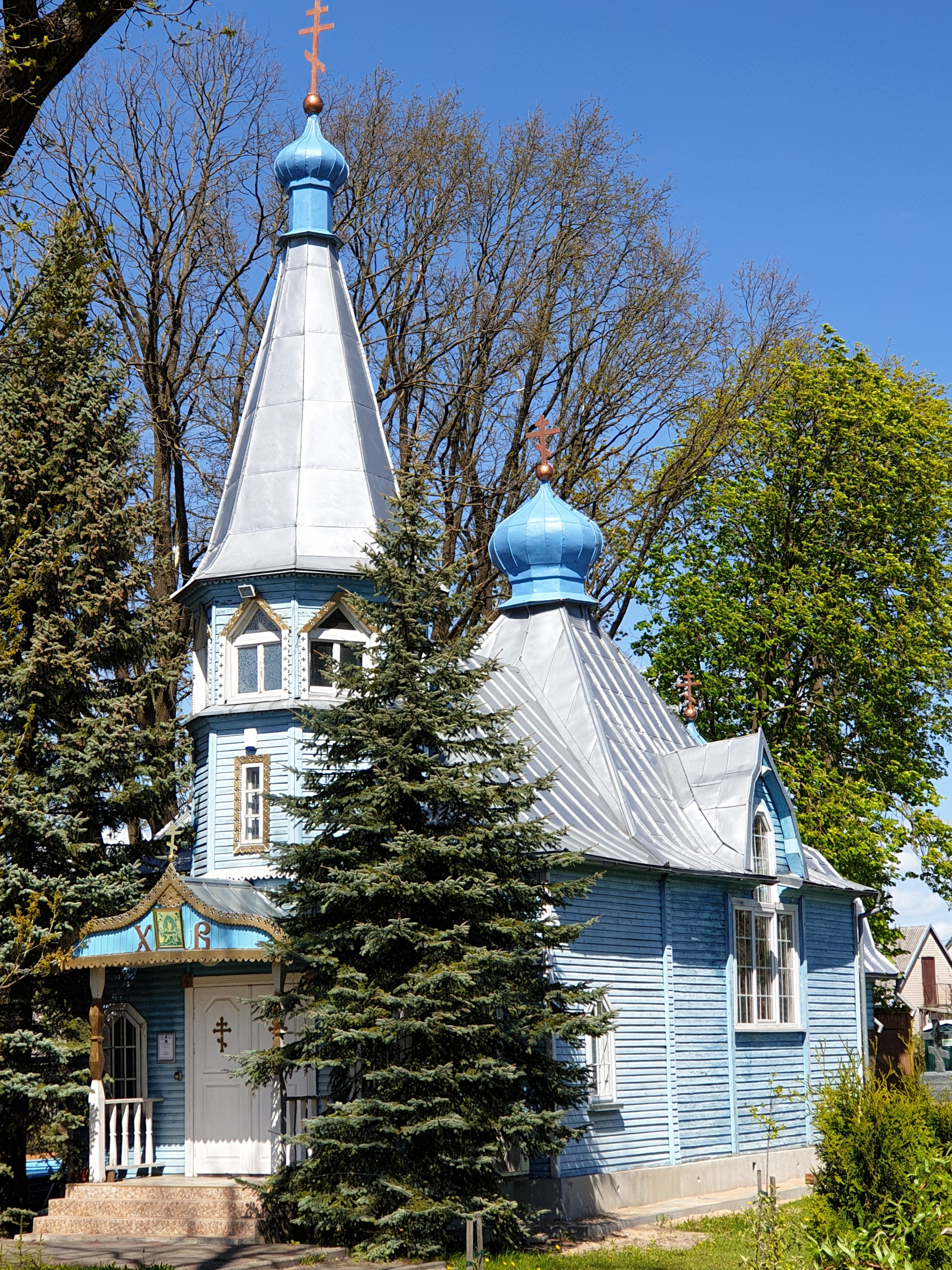
Orthodox church

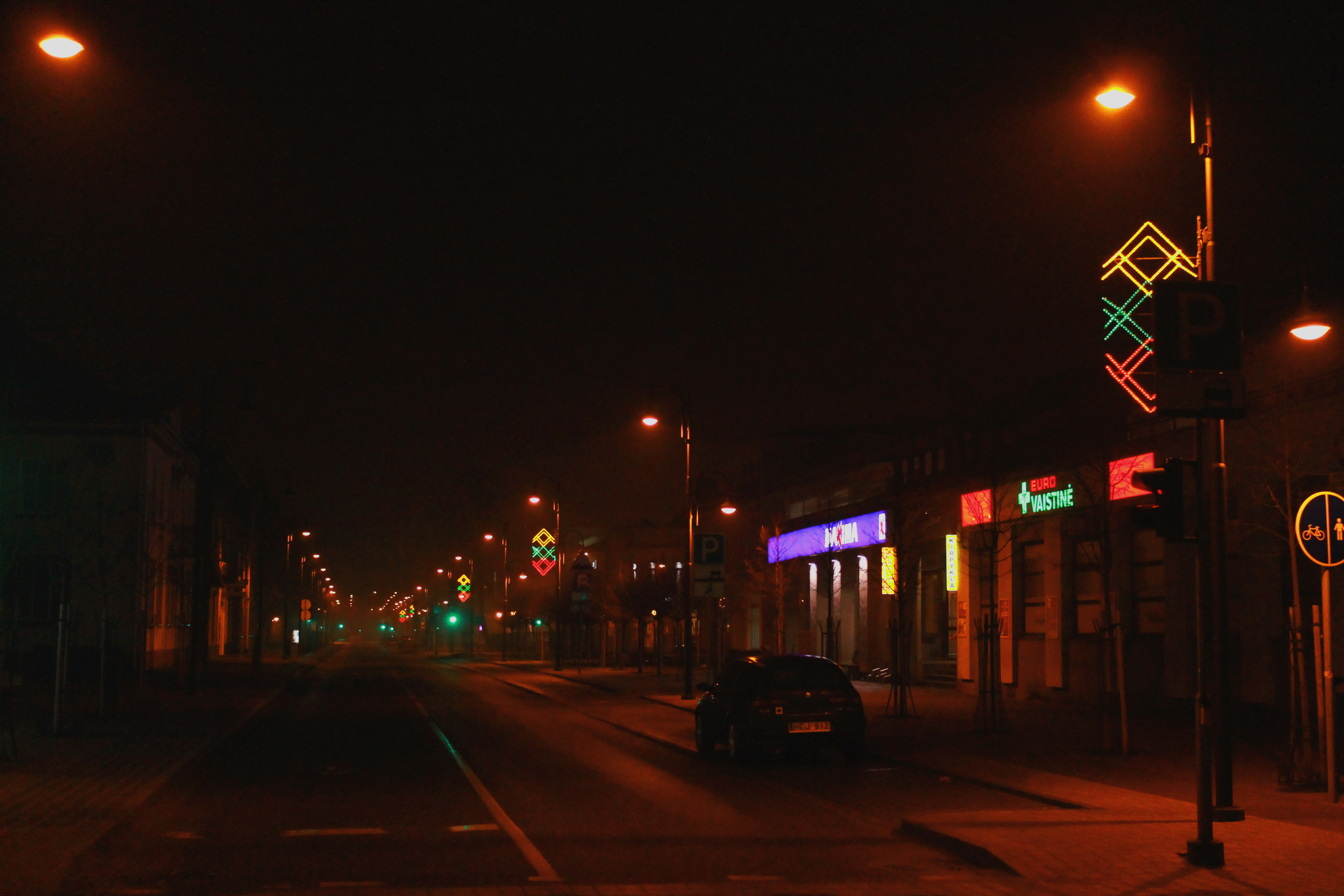
Laisvės (Freedom) Street at night

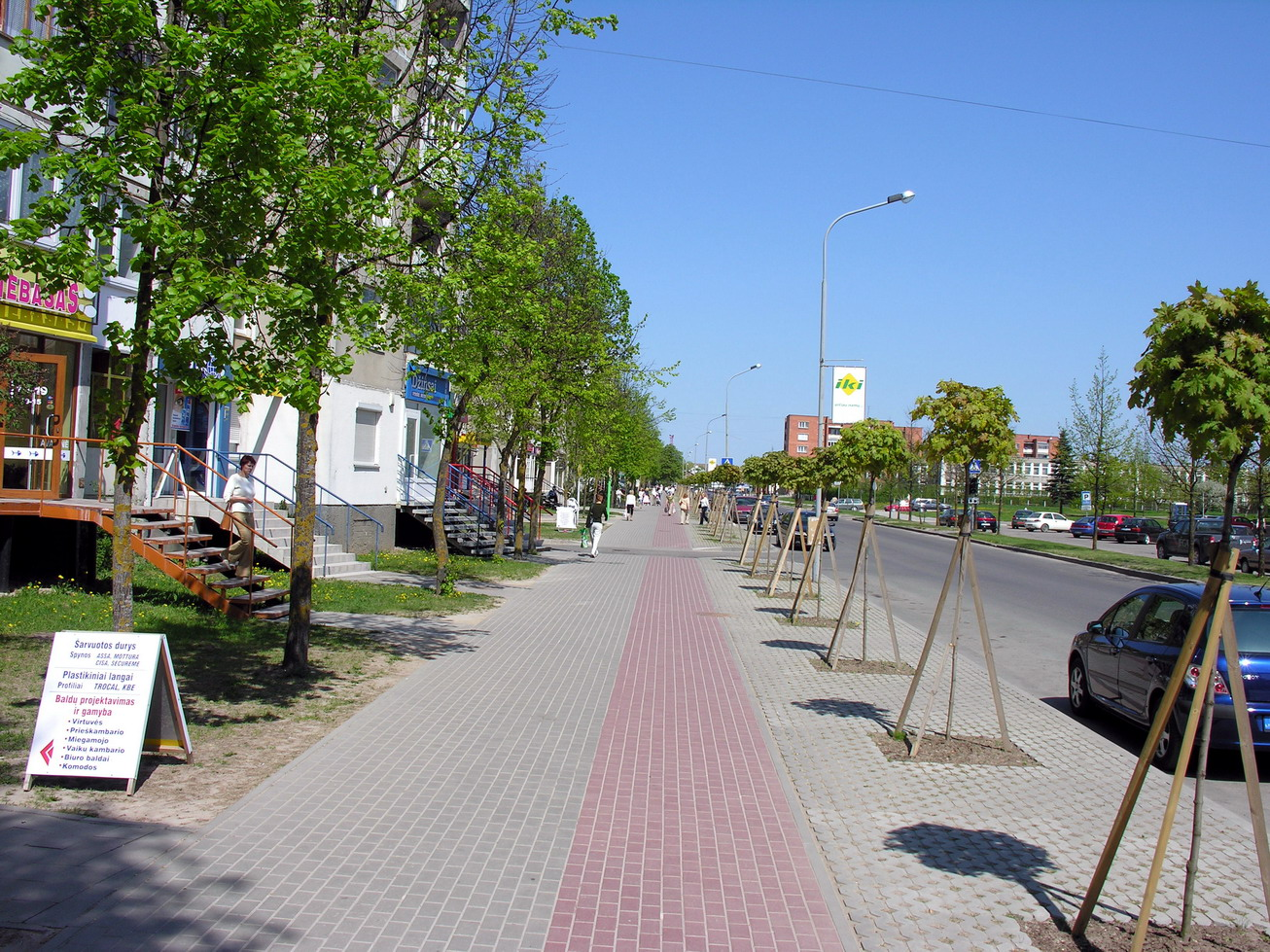
Naftininkų Street

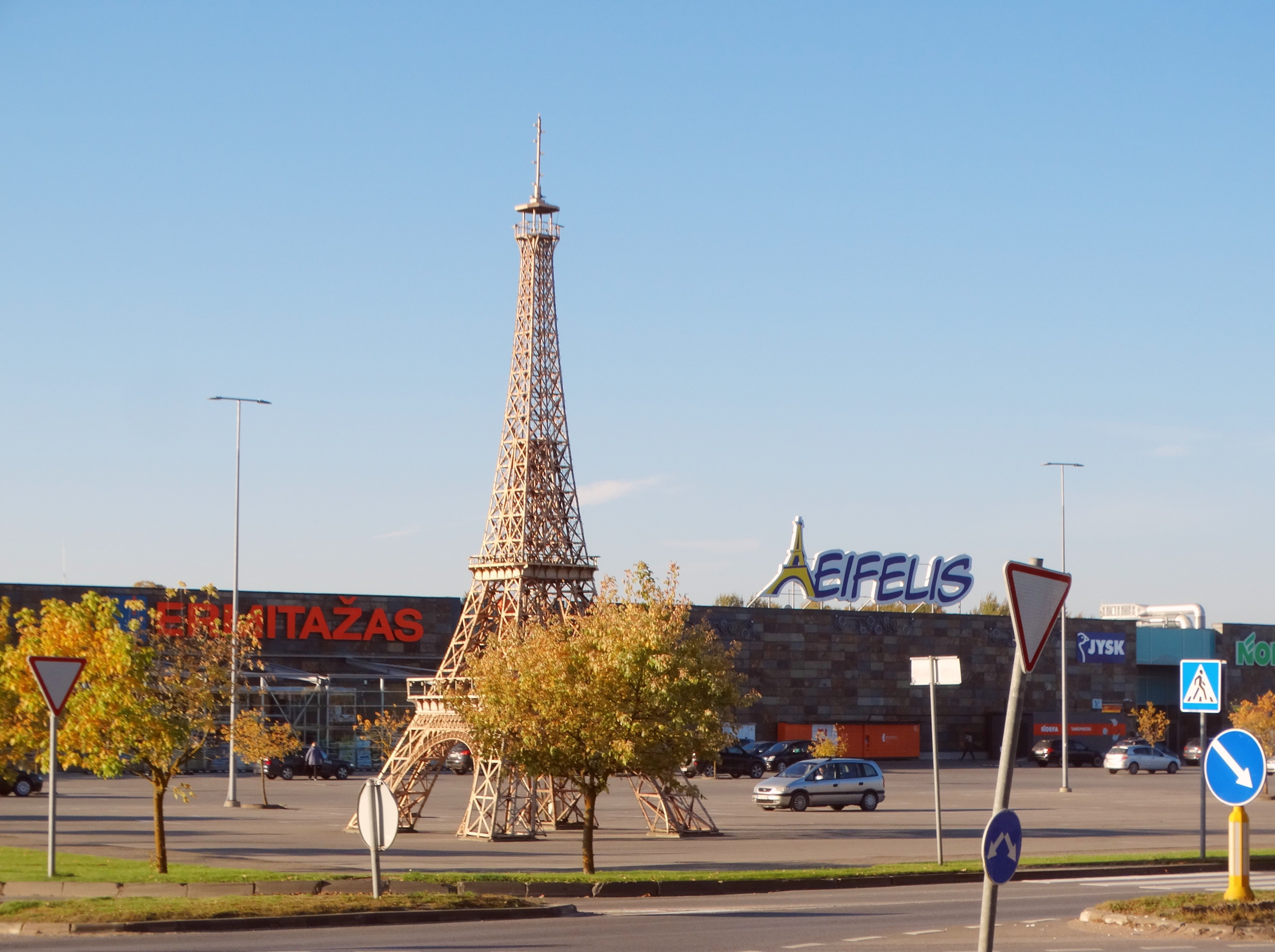
Shopping mall "Eifelis"

== See also ==
- Asteroid 248839 Mazeikiai named in honor of the city
