= Orlen Lietuva =

Subsidiary of Polish PKN Orlen

Coordinates: 56°23′22″N 22°10′17″E

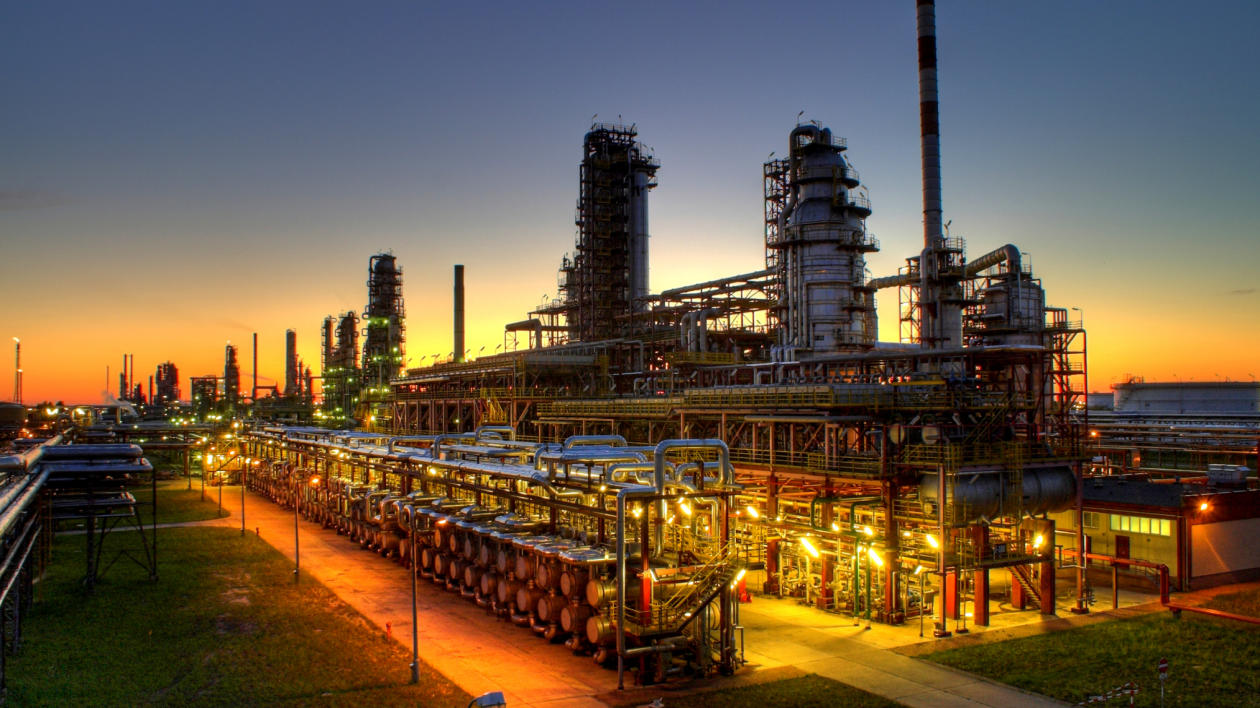
- Oil refinery near Mažeikiai
- Industry: Oil, petrol
- Founded: 24 January 1991
- Headquarters: Juodeikiai, Mažeikiai District Municipality, Lithuania
- Key people: Dariusz Zonenberg (CEO and chair of board)
- Revenue: ▼€5.3 billion (2025)
- Operating income: ▲€14 million (2025)
- Net income: ▲€24 million (2025)
- Number of employees: 1,543 (2025)
- Parent: Orlen
- Website: www.orlenlietuva.lt

Orlen Lietuva (former Mažeikių Nafta) is a Lithuanian subsidiary of the Polish Orlen SA that is in charge of the Mažeikiai Oil Refinery, the only oil refinery in the Baltic States, as well as oil production plants in the country. It also controls pipelines and the Būtingė oil terminal. Based on its 2025 revenue, Orlen Lietuva was the biggest company in Lithuania.

== Refinery ==
The Mažeikiai refinery, located near the town of Mažeikiai, has a design processing capacity of 15 million tons of sour crude oil per year. However, it is more efficient to process around 8 million tons of crude oil, while using the remaining capacity for processing other feedstock. Its monthly stable production levels are between 600 to 880kt, with at the moment ongoing modernization to increase that to over 1 million tonne. The modernization is expected to be completed in 2027. In 2025, the refinery processed 9.7 million tonnes of crude oil. A 42.2-megawatt solar farm is being constructed at the refinery to power its operations.

The production is roughly segregated into:

- 50% – diesels + kerosene;
- 30% – gasolines + liquefied petroleum gas;
- 20% – fuel oil + bitumen.

Historically, the primary feedstock has been Russian crude oil transported via the Druzhba pipeline through Biržai, however the relevant branch of this system has been closed in Russian territory since July 2006, ostensibly "for repairs". Crude oil is now being supplied by the Būtingė oil terminal (see below). The Mažeikiai refinery is the only oil refinery in the Baltic States.

== Pipeline system ==
Orlen Lietuva operates a system of pipelines with a total length of around 500 kilometers. This system includes two pump stations near Biržai, previously used to transport 15 million tons of crude oil a year, and another near Joniškis, crude oil pipelines to the Mažeikiai Refinery and Būtingė Terminal, a crude oil pipeline leading to Ventspils, and another products pipeline supplying diesel fuel to the same location. Construction of the pipelines in Lithuania started in 1966, with the first crude oil being put through them in 1968. In 1992, the company Naftotiekis was founded for the operation of Lithuanian pipelines, which became part of Mažeikių Nafta in 1998.

== Būtingė Marine Terminal ==
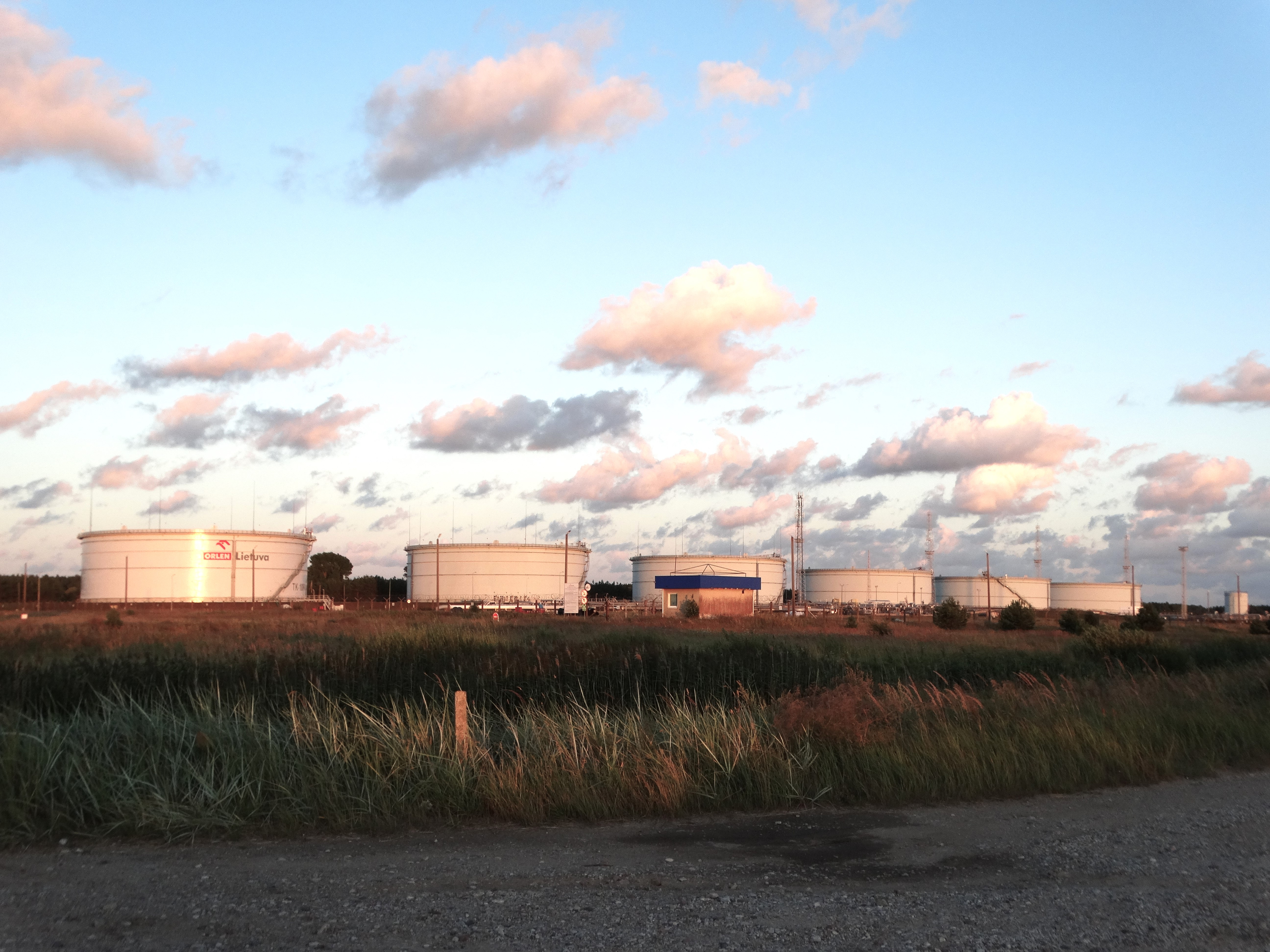
Oil tanks of Būtingė terminal

The Būtingė oil terminal is a facility owned by Orlen Lietuva, situated in an all-year-round ice-free area of the Baltic Sea on the Lithuanian coastline near the town of Būtingė, north of Šventoji. The project began in 1995 when the company Būtingės Nafta was established for the purpose of constructing and operating the Terminal. In 1998, Būtingės Nafta was merged into Mažeikių Nafta.

The terminal is set up as a bidirectional facility, with ships anchoring at a single buoy mooring 7.3 kilometres (4.5 mi) offshore in Lithuanian territorial waters with an offshore pipeline, onshore terminal equipment and six oil tanks holding 264,690 tones at Būtingė, and the crude oil pipeline that connects the facility with the Mažeikiai Refinery inland. The Terminal is set up to handle 14 million tons of product a year.

During the construction of the facility, an environmental monitoring program was introduced that includes tests of sea and ground waters. With the start of the terminal operations, an expanded environmental monitoring program was launched. This included a computer-based leak detection system.

The first tanker was loaded in Būtingė in the July 1999 - the Greek-flag Centaur took on board a shipment of 68,544 tons of YUKOS crude oil. The terminal handled its 1000th tanker by mid-2013, with 99% of handled crude oil being the Russian Export Blend Crude Oil. At the time it accumulated 57.7 million tons of imports, and nearly 37.7 million tons of exports.

== Privatization ==
Profit and loss account in mln. USD

The company was first privatized by the Lithuanian government in 1999, when it was bought by Williams Companies, a group based in the USA. Later, Williams ran into financial trouble and their stake in Mažeikių Nafta was bought by the Russian company Yukos. However, in 2003 Yukos ran afoul of the Russian authorities and was required to pay billions of dollars in taxes. Facing bankruptcy, Yukos began to sell off its assets, including Mažeikių Nafta.

Several potential buyers from Russia, Kazakhstan and Poland showed interest in acquiring the refinery, whose majority stakeholder was now Yukos International, a Yukos syndicate. After several months of talks the proposal from Polish company PKN Orlen was found most lucrative and chosen. Additionally, it was deemed most desirable by Lithuania, which has been aiming to avoid the refinery and infrastructure being bought out by Russian interests due to the national security concerns. To force the sale to Yukos for lower price, Russia has shut down the only land pipeline, which New York Times described as "tools for intimidation and blackmail".

The agreement between Orlen and Yukos International to buy out the latter's 53.7% stake in the company, was made in June 2006. Several weeks later, PKN Orlen signed a deal with the Lithuanian government to buy a further 30.66%. The European Union's regulatory authority approved the deal on November 7, after ruling that it would not significantly harm competition in the European economic area or any substantial part of it. The buyout was finalized on 15 December 2006, with US$1.492 billion paid by PKN Orlen to Yukos International, and US$851.8 million to the Lithuanian Government.

== Incidents ==
=== Druzhba pipeline Lithuanian branch shutdown ===
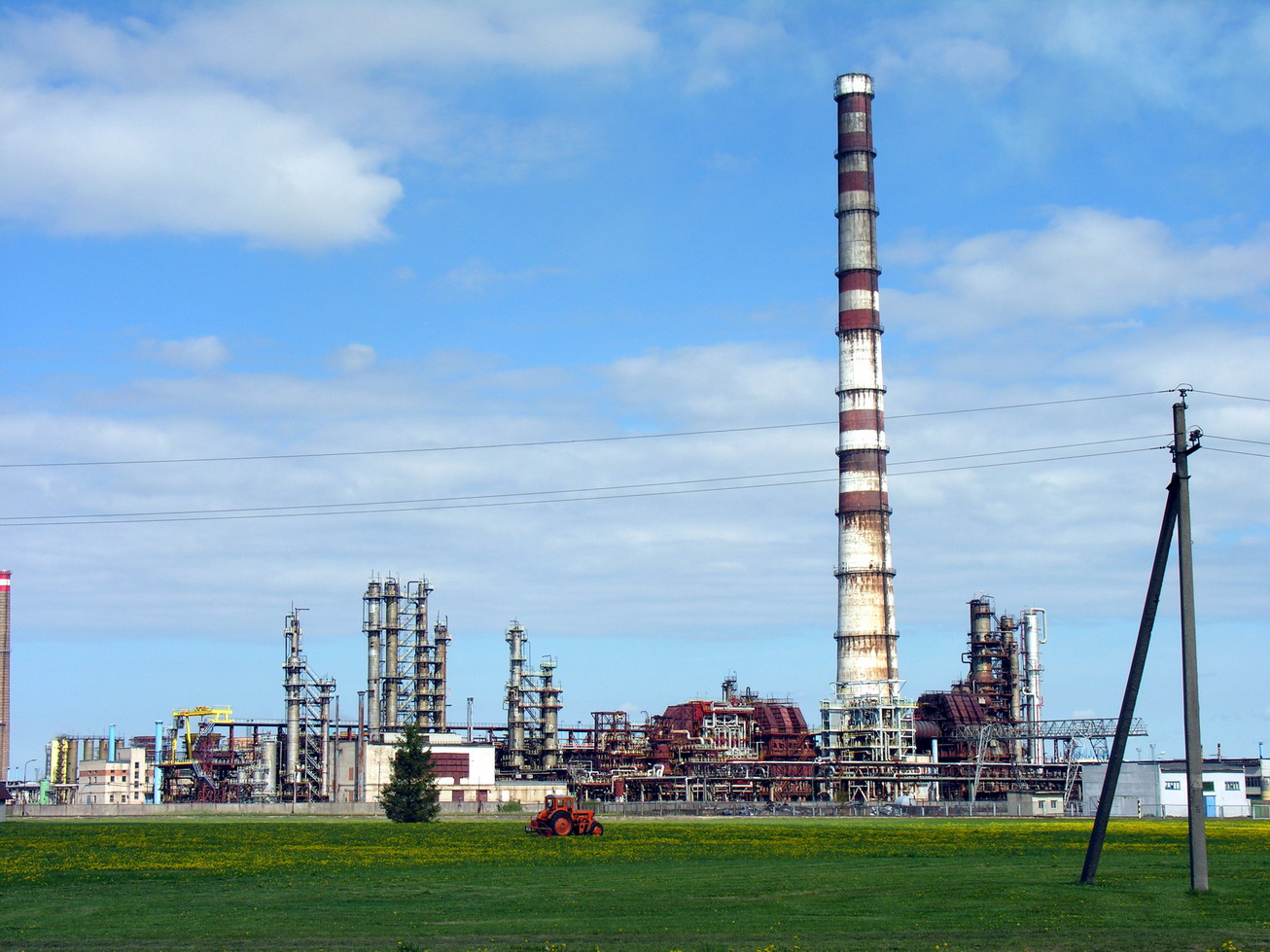
Mažeikiai oil refinery in 2006

On 29 July 2006 Russia shut down oil export to Mažeikių oil refinery in Lithuania after an oil spill on the Druzhba pipeline system occurred in Russia's Bryansk oblast, near the point where a line to Belarus and Lithuania branches off the main export pipeline. Transneft said it would need one year and nine months to repair the damaged section. Although Russia cited technical reasons for stopping oil deliveries to Lithuania, Lithuania claims that the oil supply was stopped in response to Lithuania selling the Mažeikių refinery to Polish company PKN Orlen in an effort to avoid the refinery and infrastructure being bought out by Russian interests. Russian crude oil is now being transshipped via the Būtingė oil terminal.

=== Fire ===
On October 12, 2006, a major fire erupted in the plant around 2:30 pm. The cause appears to have been a leak. The fire was extinguished after 8 pm the same day, although some spot fires were still being put out the next day. During the fire, a 50-meter height vacuum tower collapsed, oil products leaked out, and a series of explosions were heard; The blaze covered about 800 square meters at one point. 23 firefighting vehicles were brought to the scene of the accident and eyewitness accounts said that fires reached 150m in height and could be seen from several kilometers away. A black cloud of smoke could be seen from a great distance, and drifted towards the nearby Latvian border. There were no casualties among personnel. Damages incurred are estimated at 38 million Euro, as well as around 30 million in lost revenue due to production losses. While significant, when compared with the total output and profits of the plant, they are not as large as had been feared. Initially, after the fire, serious doubts were raised by various media over whether PKN Orlen would go through with the deal to buy the company (although these were immediately denied by Orlen representatives). In the end, the blaze did not stop the deal from going ahead. Suspicions were raised by various high-profile persons as to whether the fire was an accident, or industrial sabotage on the part of the Russian energy companies in revenge for not being offered to buy the company. The vice-leader of the Russian Duma, Konstantin Kosachev, stated that "instability will continue to plague the refinery until the Lithuanians finally realize which partners one should choose" only a few hours before the start of the blaze.
