= Būtingė =

Lithuanian Coastal Village

Coordinates: 56°02′N 21°07′E

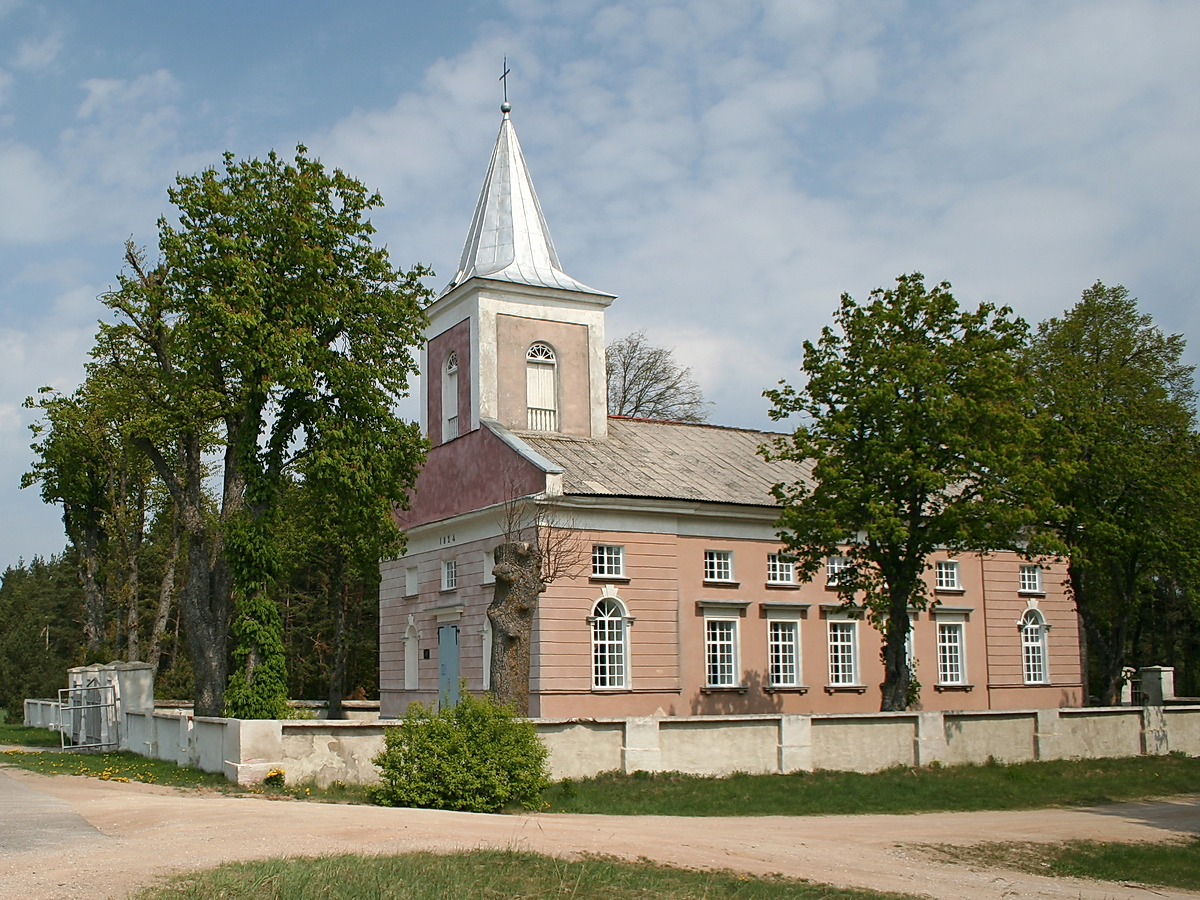
The church of Būtingė

Būtingė (German: Butendiekshof or Budendiekshof) is a small village at the coast of the Baltic Sea in the north of Lithuania, at the border to Latvia. It belongs to Palanga City Municipality, and is situated 17 km (11 mi) north of the town Palanga. The village has long time belonged to Livonia, and is a part of Lithuania since 1921.

The Būtingė oil terminal, a part of ORLEN Lietuva, has been in operation since 1999. The terminal is somewhat controversial because of fear of oil spills, which have occurred. Since July 2006 the Būtingė oil terminal is the only way for supplying ORLEN Lietuva (former Mažeikių Nafta) with oil, because the Russian partner state controlled Lukoil corporation has cut off the supply through the Druzhba pipeline from Russia.
