= Edmundas =

- Gender: Male

Origin
- Region of origin: Lithuania

Edmundas is a Lithuanian masculine given name and may refer to:

- Edmundas Antanas Rimša (b. 1948), Lithuanian historian, specialist of heraldics and sfragistics
- Edmundas Benetis (b. 1953), Lithuanian architect
