= Benetis =

- Lithuanian surname
- m.: Benetis
- f.: (unmarried): Benetytė
- f.: (married): Benetienė

Benetis is a Lithuanian surname. Notable people with the surname include:

- Edmundas Benetis
- Rimantas Benetis (born 1957), Lithuanian cardiac surgeon, rector of the Lithuanian University of Health Sciences
