= Jono Basanavičiaus Street, Palanga =

Street in Palanga, Lithuania

Jono Basanavičiaus Street
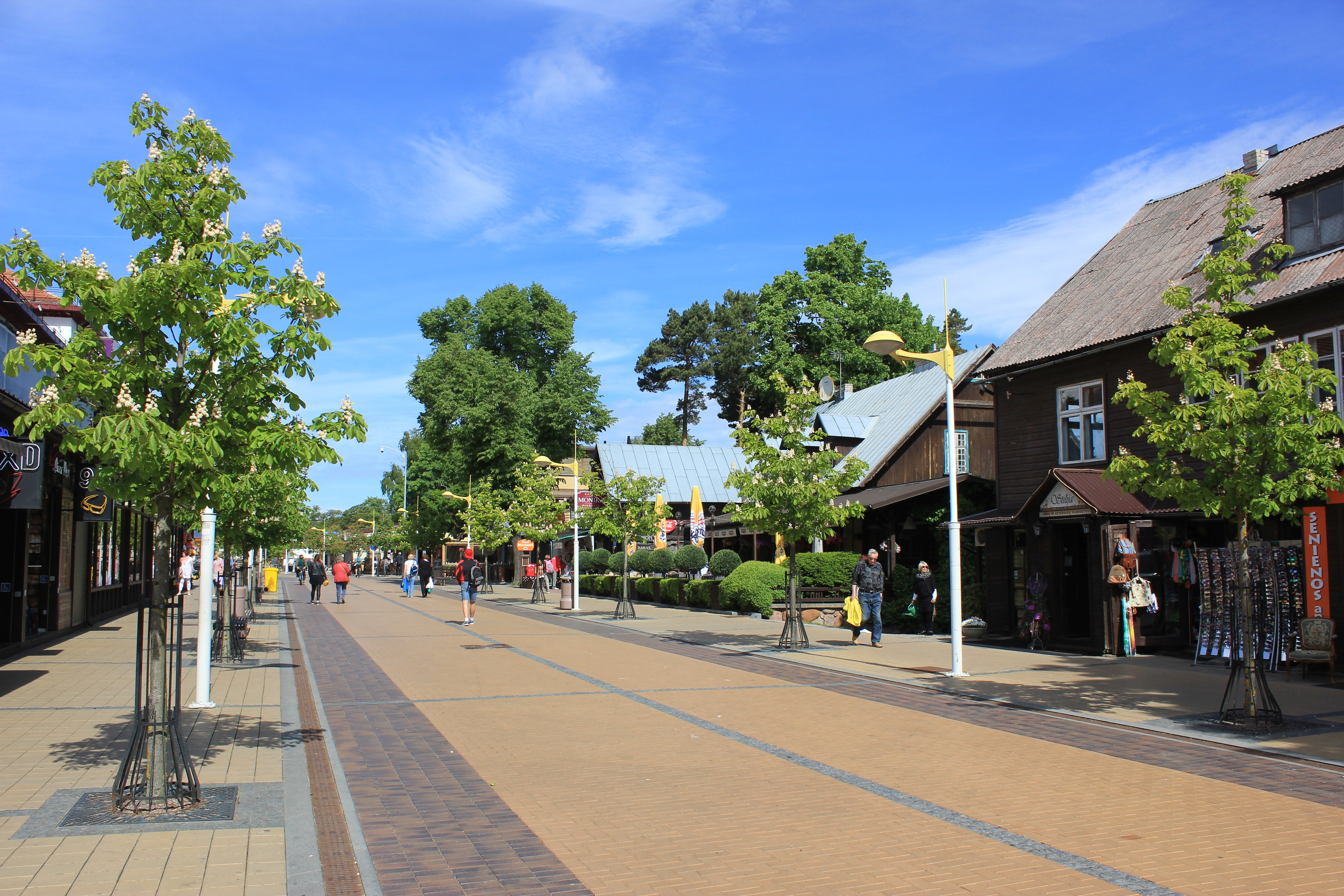
- Jono Basanavičiaus Street in 2017
- Native name: Jono Basanavičiaus gatvė (Lithuanian)
- Former name(s): Tiškevičiaus Street, Tiškevičiaus Boulevard
- Location: Palanga, Lithuania

Jono Basanavičiaus Street (Lithuanian: Jono Basanavičiaus gatvė) is a central street in Palanga, the most popular and biggest summer resort in Lithuania. It is named after Jonas Basanavičius, the chairman of the session that adopted the Act of Independence of Lithuania, who personally visited Palanga in 1924.

The pedestrian street has many restaurants, coffeehouses, entertainment facilities and lead to the Palanga Pier and Palanga Beach, thus it is exceptionally popular among tourists.

For the sake of safety of pedestrians, the riding with bicycles and scooters is prohibited in the street in summer (from June 1 to September 1).

== Gallery ==
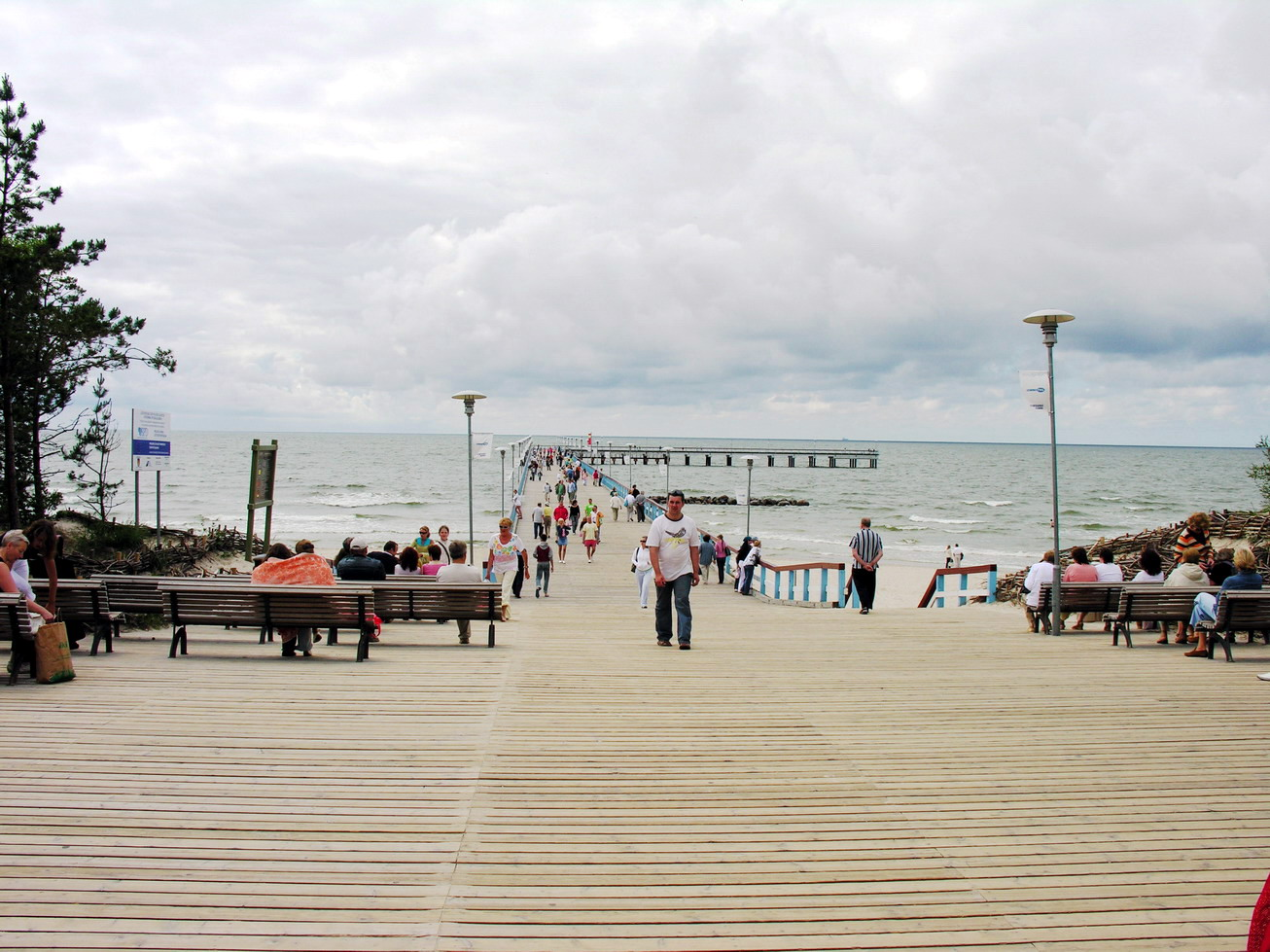
Entrance to the Palanga Pier at the end of the street

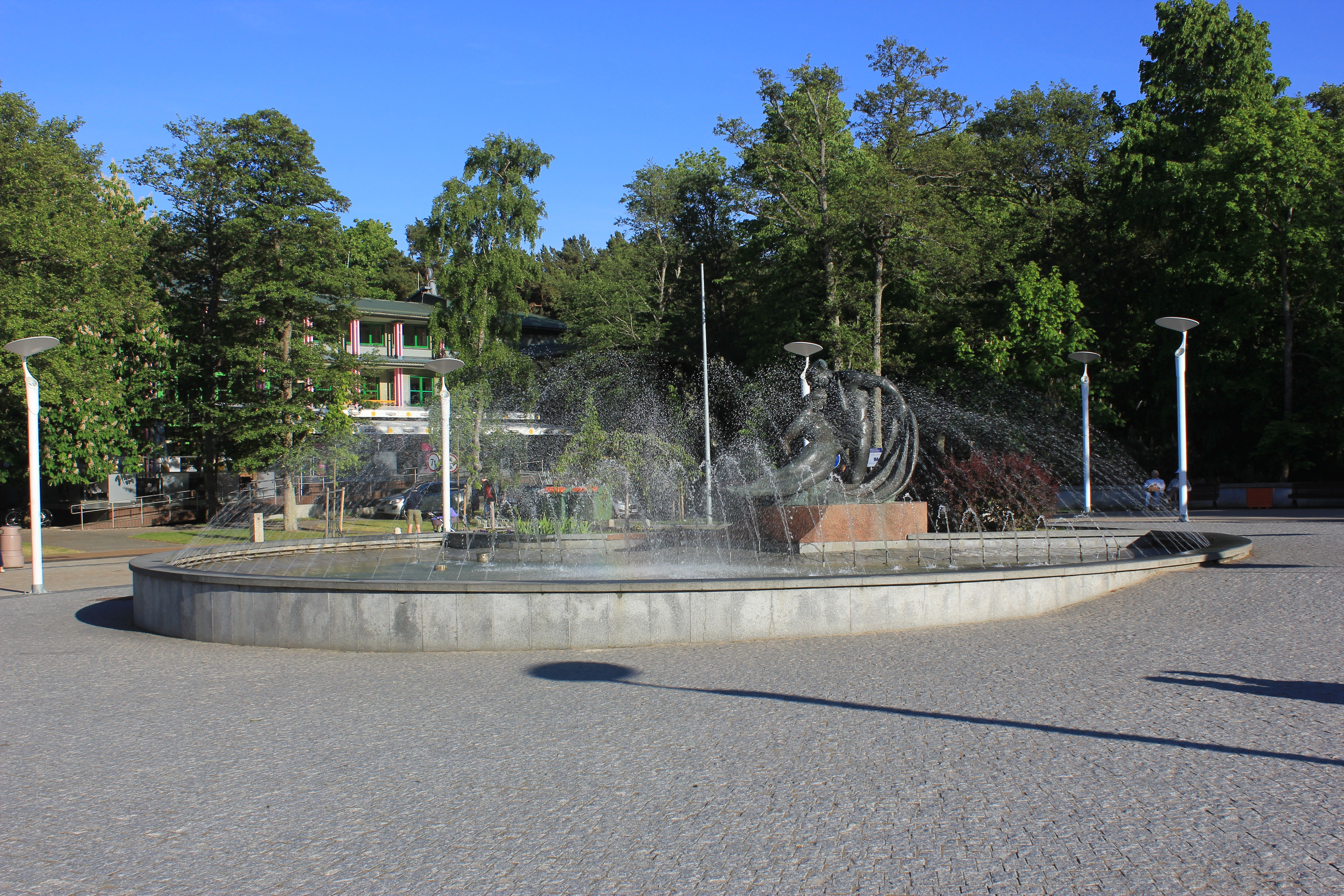
Jūratė and Kastytis Fountain

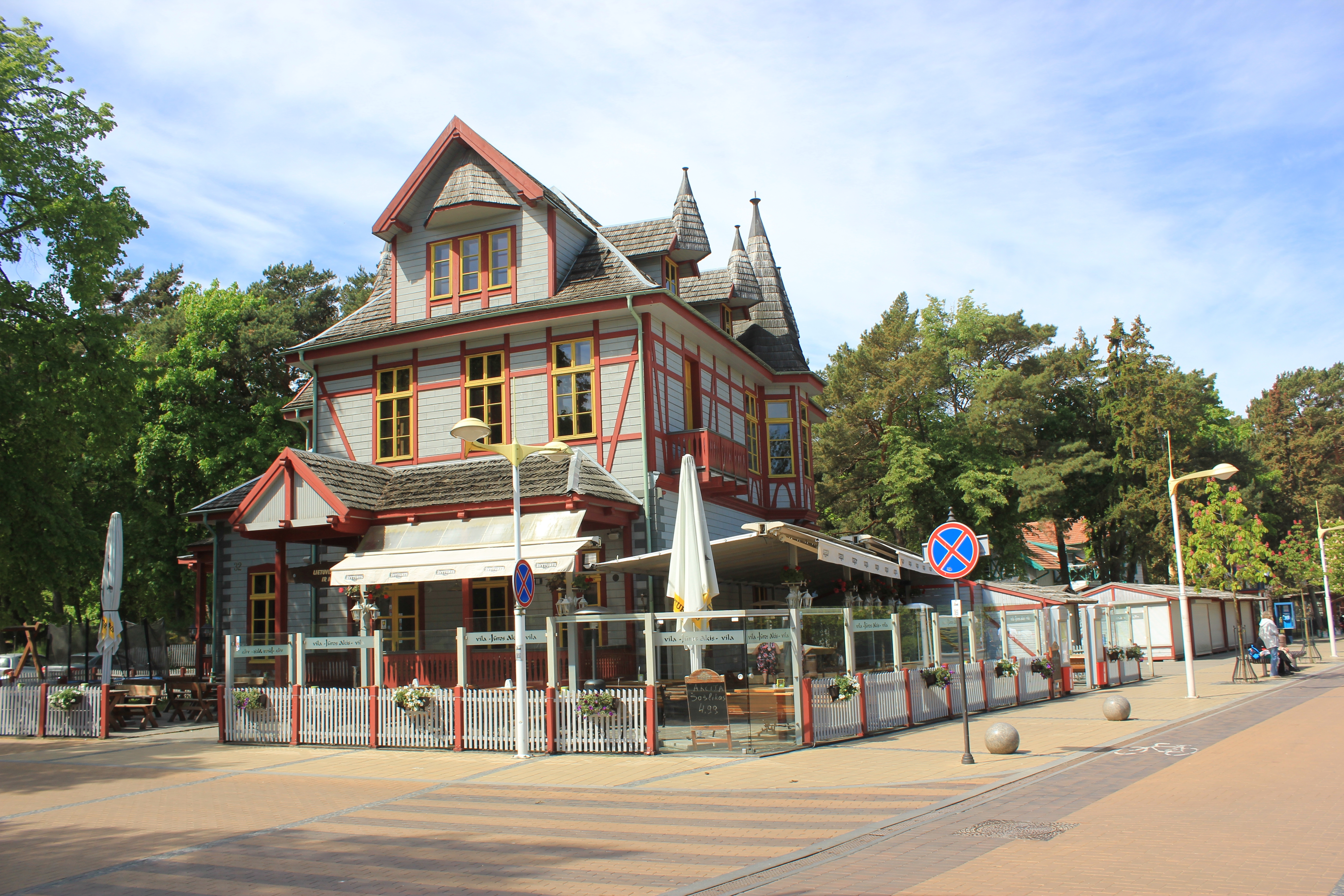
Old wooden villa in the street

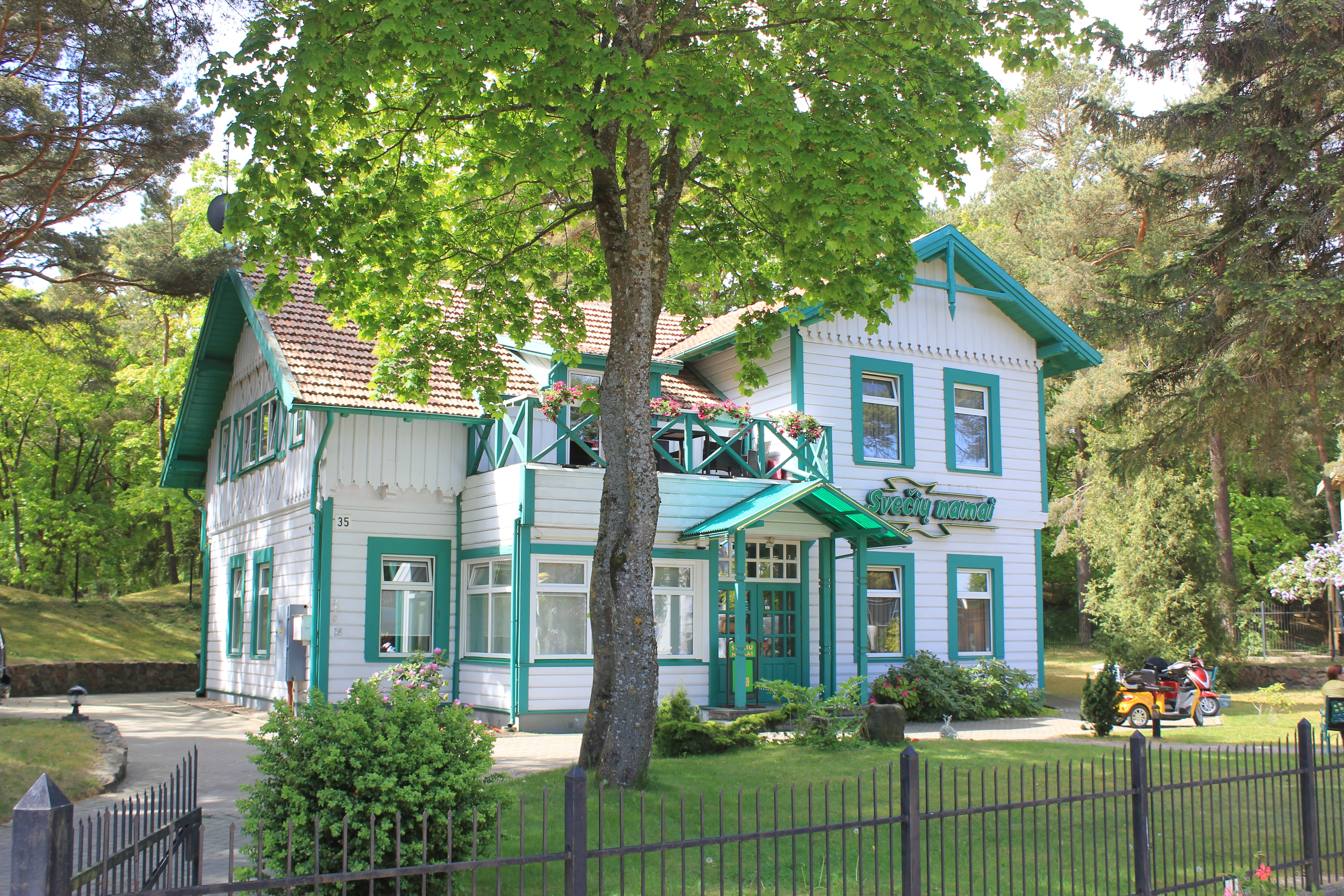
Old wooden villa in the street
