= Palanga =

Resort city in Samogitia, Lithuania

Palanga Palonga
- City
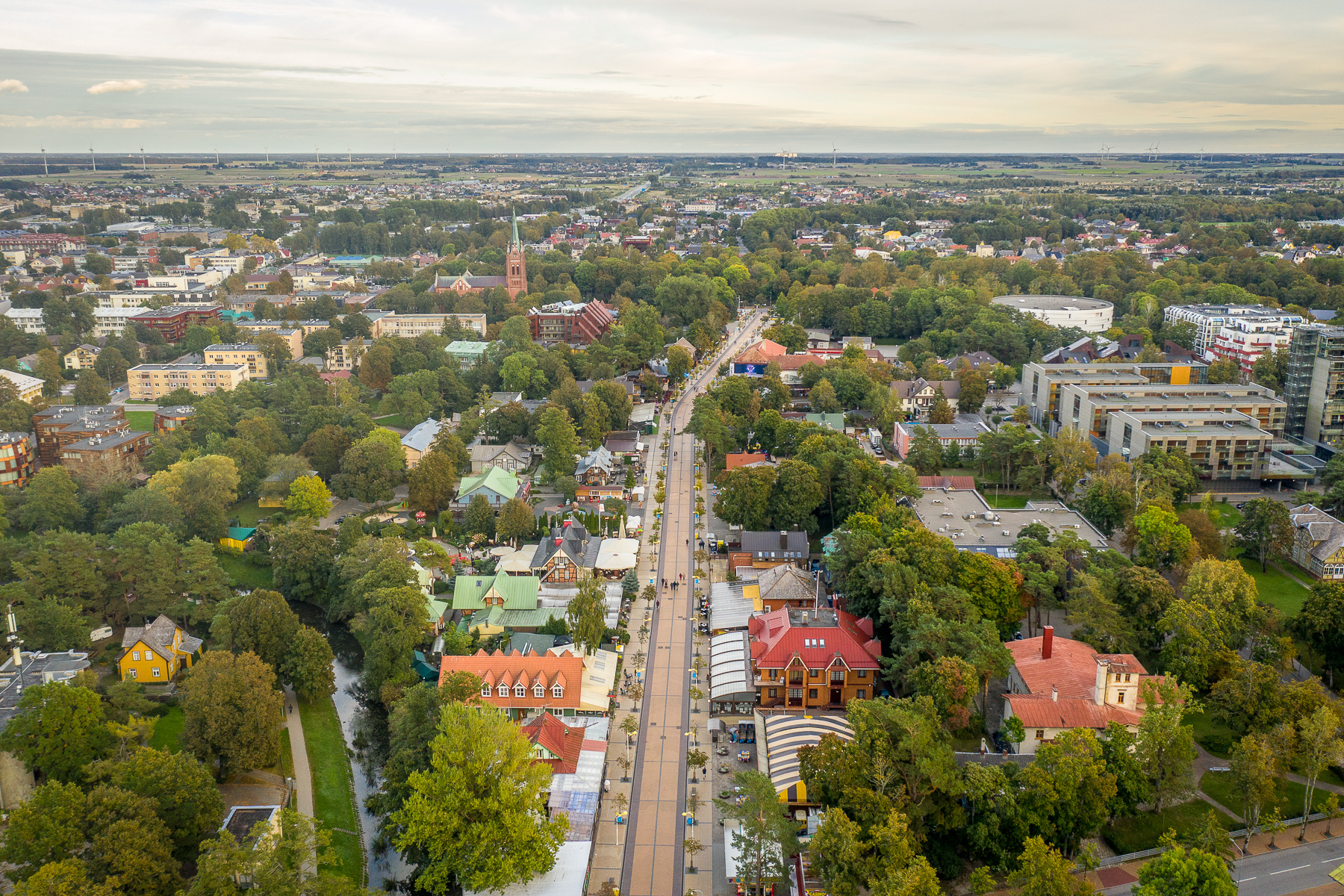
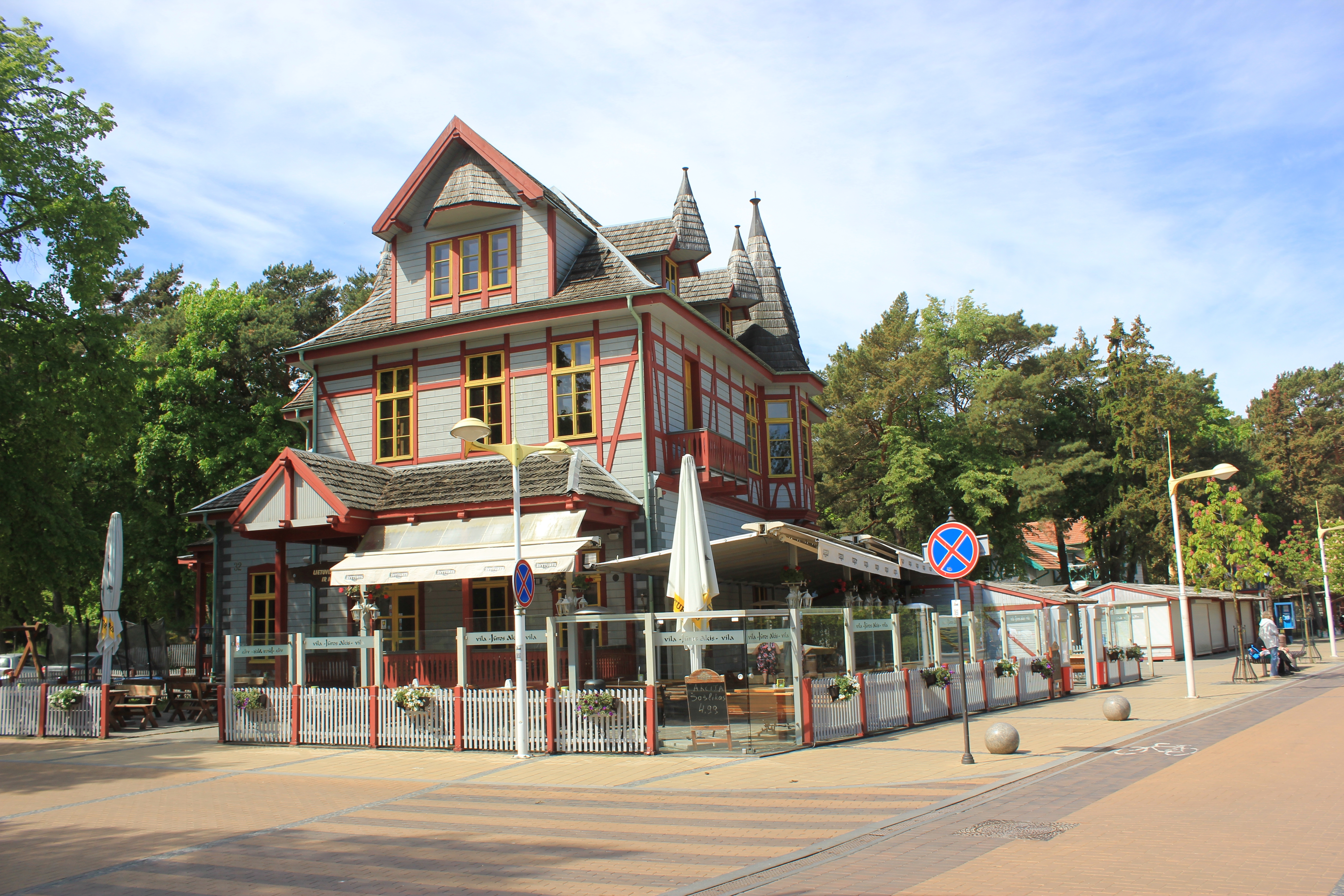
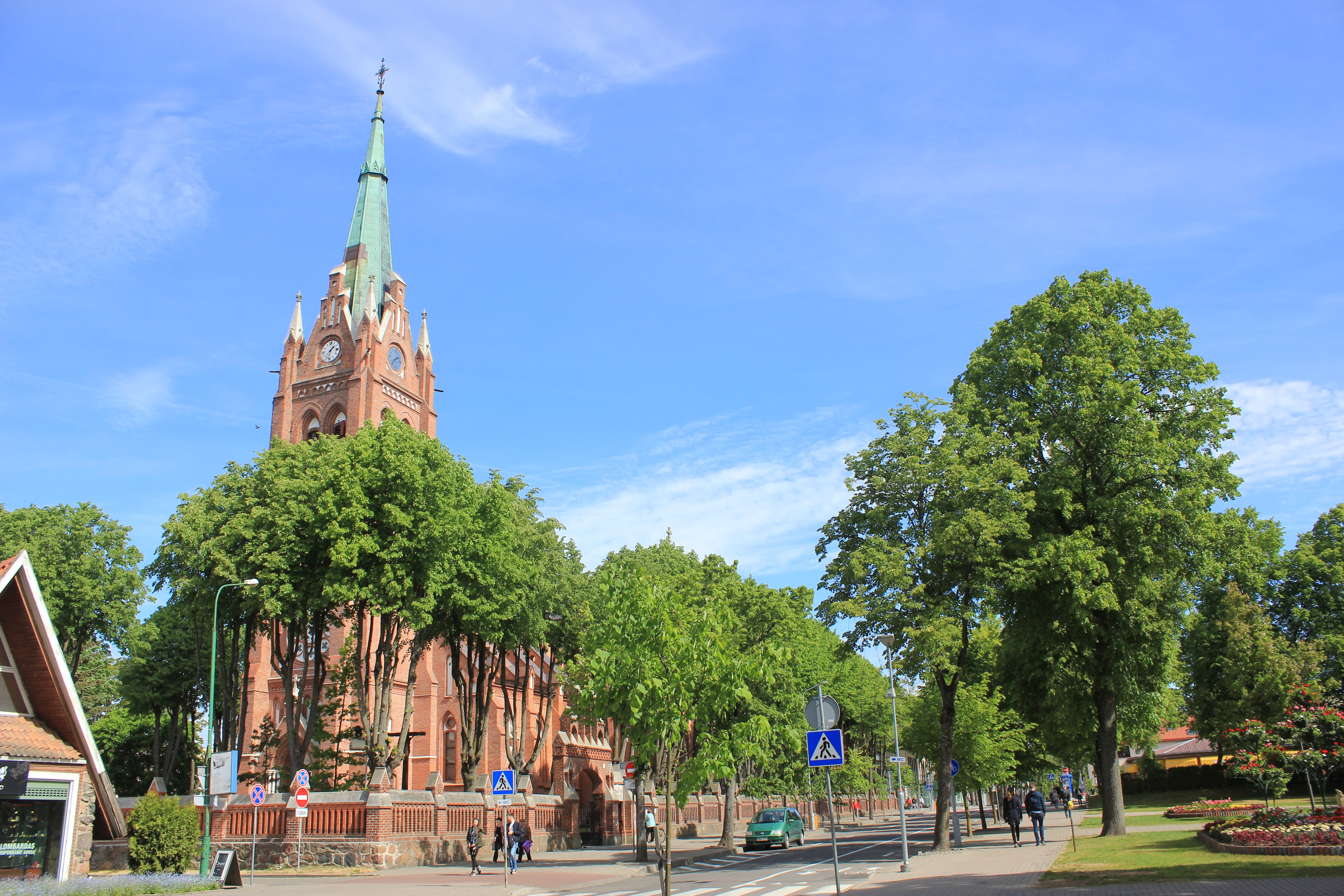
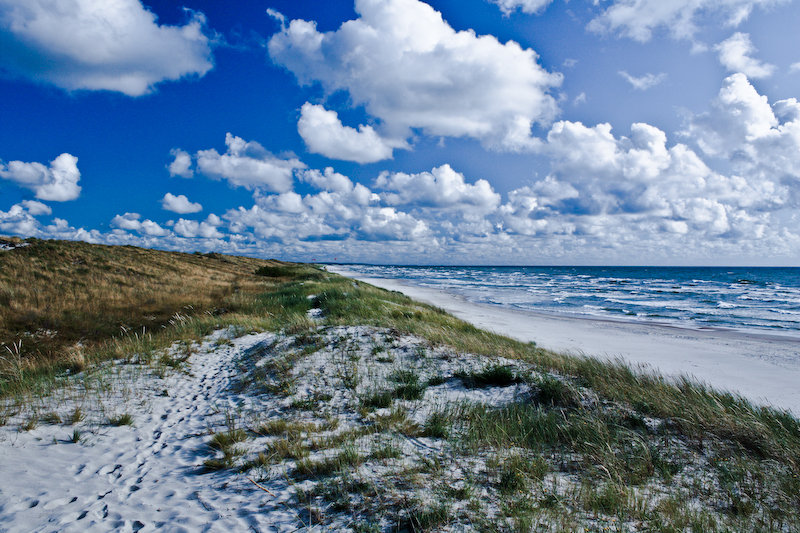
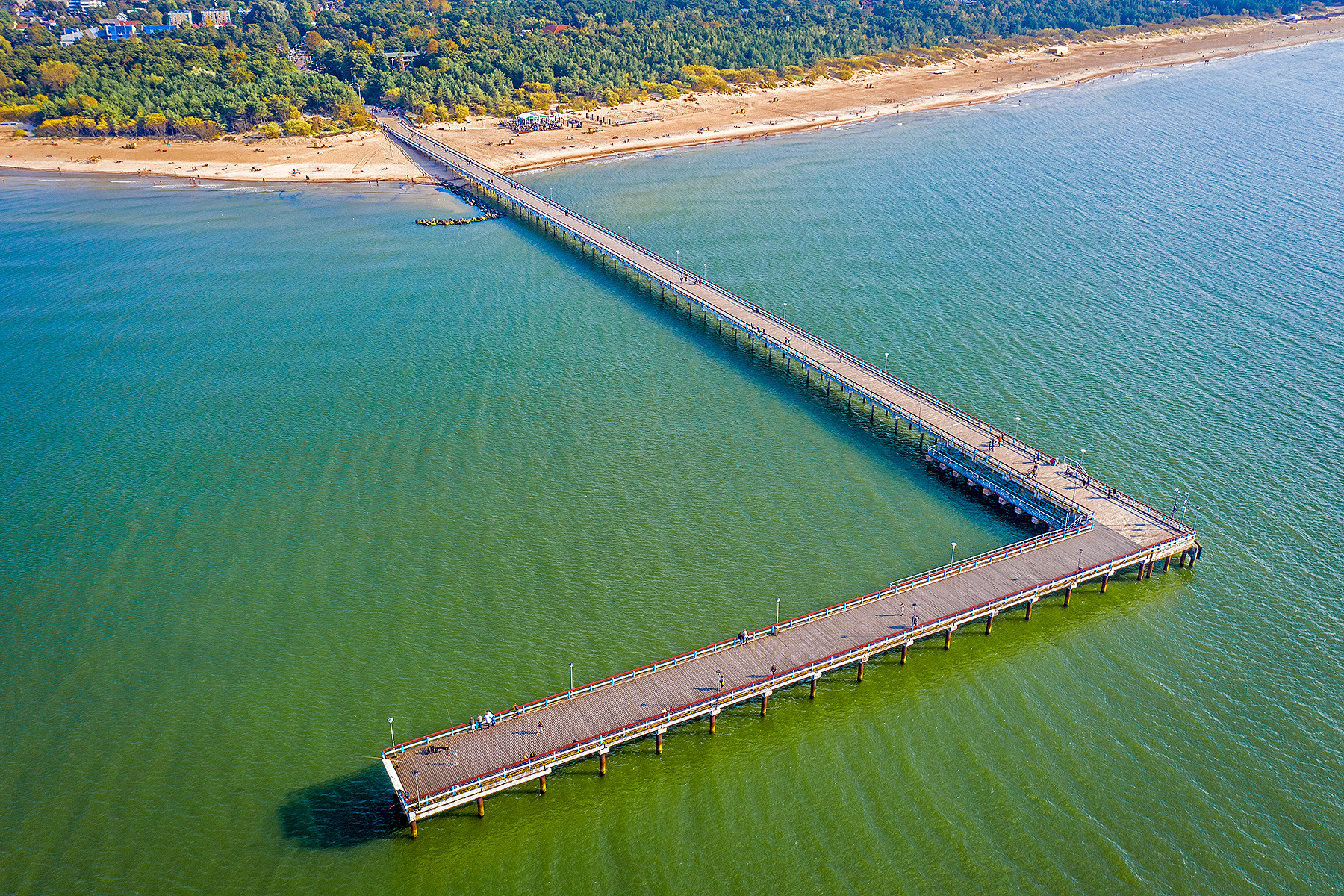
- Top to bottom, left to right: Jono Basanavičiaus Street, Old wooden resort villa, Church of the Assumption of the Blessed Virgin Mary, Palanga Beach, Palanga Pier

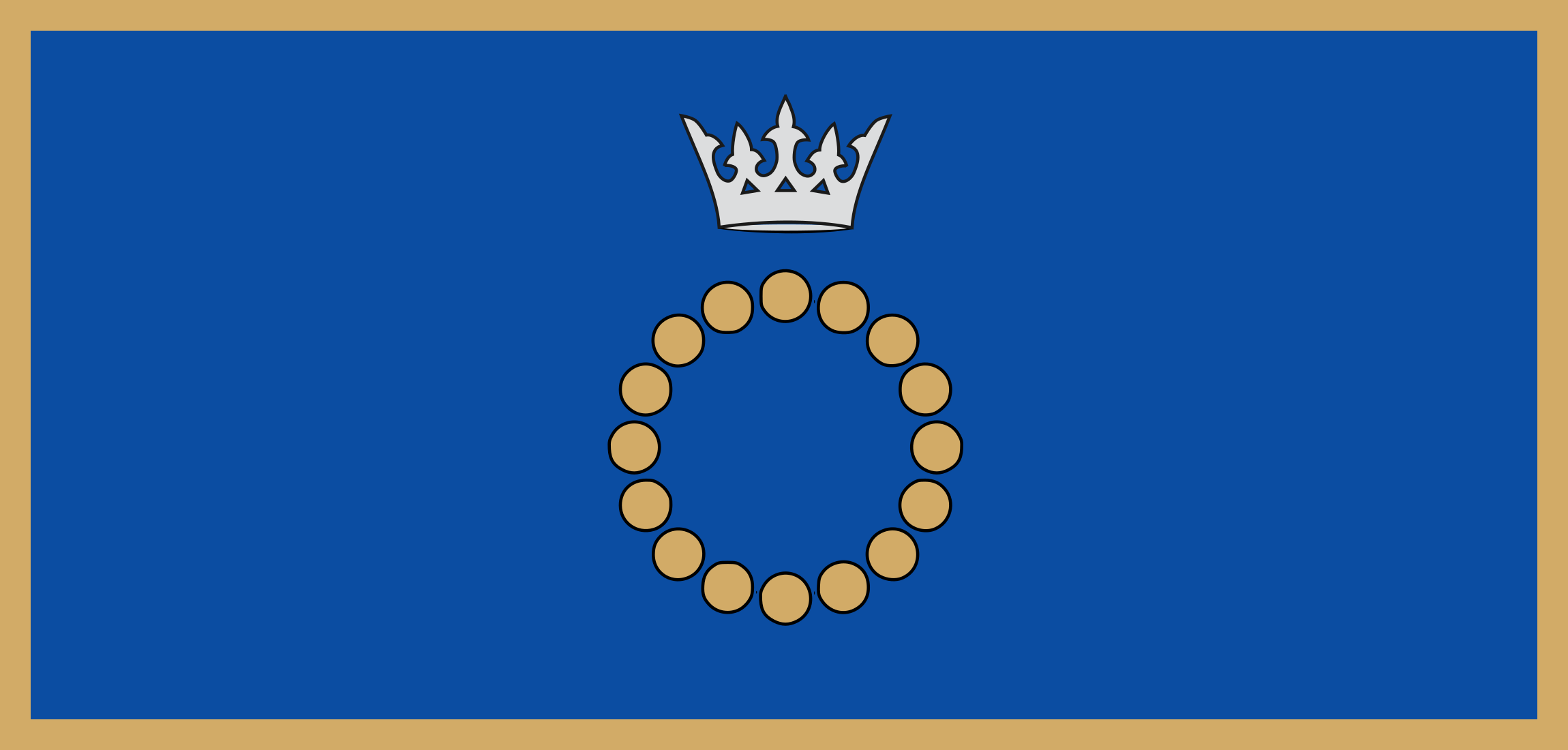
- Flag Coat of arms Brandmark
- Nickname: Vasaros sostinė (Summer Capital)
- Interactive map of Palanga
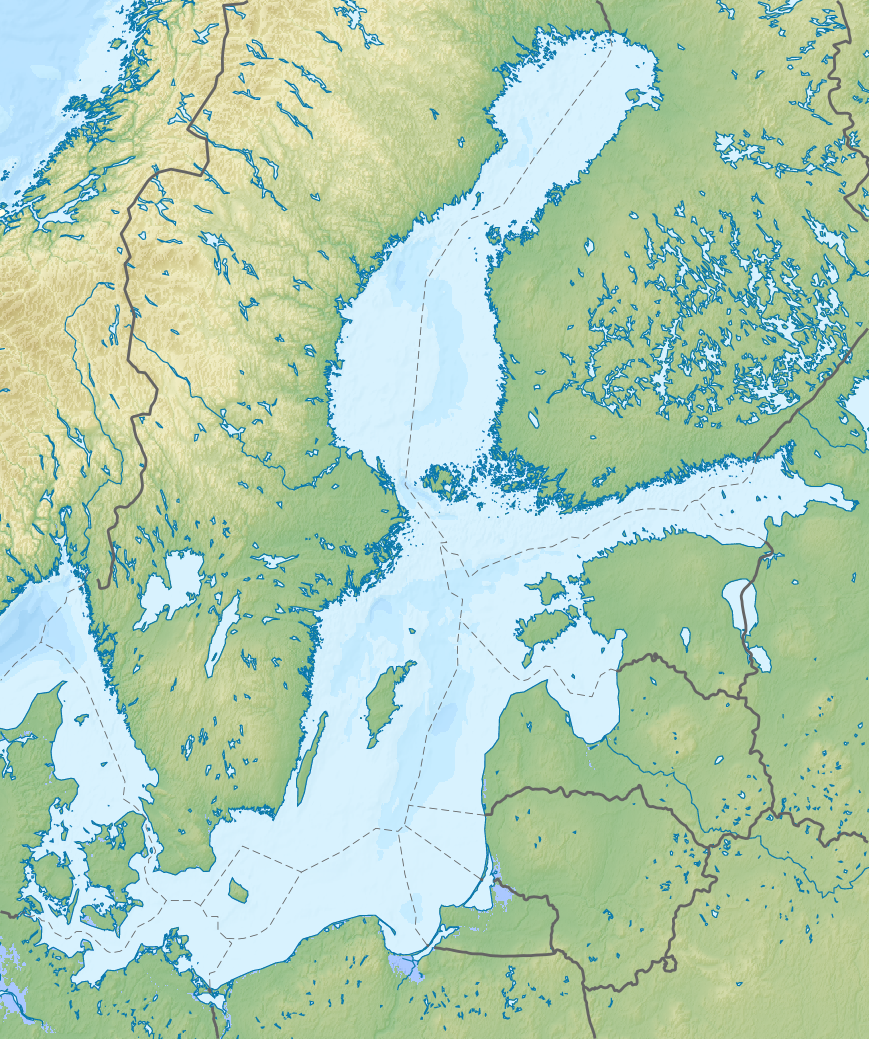
- Location of Palanga Palanga (Baltic Sea) Palanga (Europe)
- Coordinates: 55°55′N 21°4′E
- Country: Lithuania
- Ethnographic region: Samogitia
- County: Klaipėda County
- Municipality: Palanga city municipality
- First mentioned: 1161
- Granted city rights: 1791
- Elderships: Šventoji eldership

Government
  - Type: Mayor–council government
  - Body: City council
  - Mayor: Šarūnas Vaitkus (TS–LKD)

Area
  - Total: 79 km^{2} (31 sq mi)
- Elevation: 10 m (33 ft)

Population (2025)
  - Total: 18,551
  - Density: 230/km^{2} (610/sq mi)
- Demonym(s): Palangian(s) (English), palangiečiai or palangiškiai (Lithuanian)
- Time zone: UTC+2 (EET)
  - Summer (DST): UTC+3 (EEST)
- Postal code: LT-00001
- Dialing code: 370
- Website: palanga.lt

Palanga (Samogitian: Palonga) is a resort city in western Lithuania, on the shore of the Baltic Sea. The city's population as of January 2025 was 18,551.

Palanga is the busiest and the largest summer resort in Lithuania and has sandy beaches (18 km, 11 miles long and up to 300 metres, 1000 ft wide) and sand dunes.

Officially Palanga has the status of a city municipality and includes Šventoji, Nemirseta, Būtingė, Palanga International Airport and other settlements, which are considered as part of the city of Palanga.

== Etymology ==
The name of the town is likely of Curonian origin, as proposed by the linguist Kazimieras Būga. The primary argument is the suffix "-ng-", which is particularly distinctive of Curonian toponyms (Gandinga, Ablinga, Būtingė, etc.). The root pal-, furthermore, is also associated with the landscape of lowlands or marshes. This is exemplified by the Lithuanian palios, which translates to "large marsh", and the Latvian palas, meaning "marshy lake shore". These are ancient words with equivalents in other Indo-European languages, including Dacian pala, meaning "marsh, swamp, spit" and Latin palus, meaning "marsh". Therefore, the original meaning of the name Palanga may have been related to lowlands, marshes, flooded meadows, or similar terms.

In other languages Palanga is referred to as: German: Polangen; Polish: Połąga.

== Legend ==
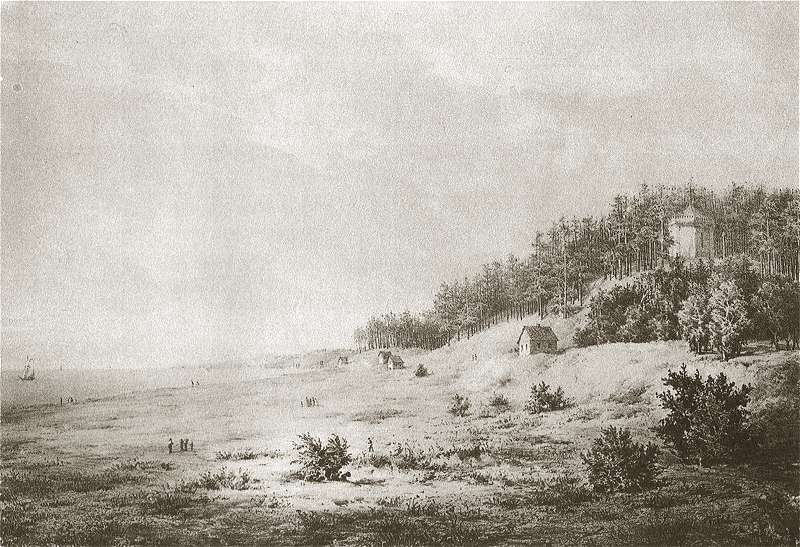
Birutės Hill (19th century painting) where Kęstutis met his wife Birutė, the mother of Lithuanian ruler and national hero Vytautas the Great

According to legend, there was a pagan shrine at the foot of a hill in Palanga where a beautiful priestess named Birutė used to tend the ceremonial fires. Having heard of Birutė's beauty, Kęstutis, the Grand Duke of Lithuania, came to make her his wife. The Lithuanian Bychowiec Chronicle records that Birutė "did not consent, and answered that she had promised the gods to remain a virgin as long as she lived.

Kęstutis then resorted to take her by force, and with great pomp brought her back to his capital, Trakai, where he invited his kinsmen and celebrated with a lavish wedding..." Kęstutis was later murdered and Birutė returned to Palanga and resumed serving at the shrine until her death. The legend claimed that she was buried in the hill which is now named after her.

== History ==
Not far from Šventoji, archaeologists discovered an encampment which indicates that the area was inhabited some 5,000 years ago. Between the 10th and 13th centuries Palanga had been one of the main settlements of Mēguva Land, inhabited by the Curonians. Situated upon the trail of the ancient Amber Road, it became a centre of trade and crafts.

In historical documents the name of Palanga was first mentioned in 1161 when King Valdemar I of Denmark disembarked there with his army and captured the castle of the Curonians.

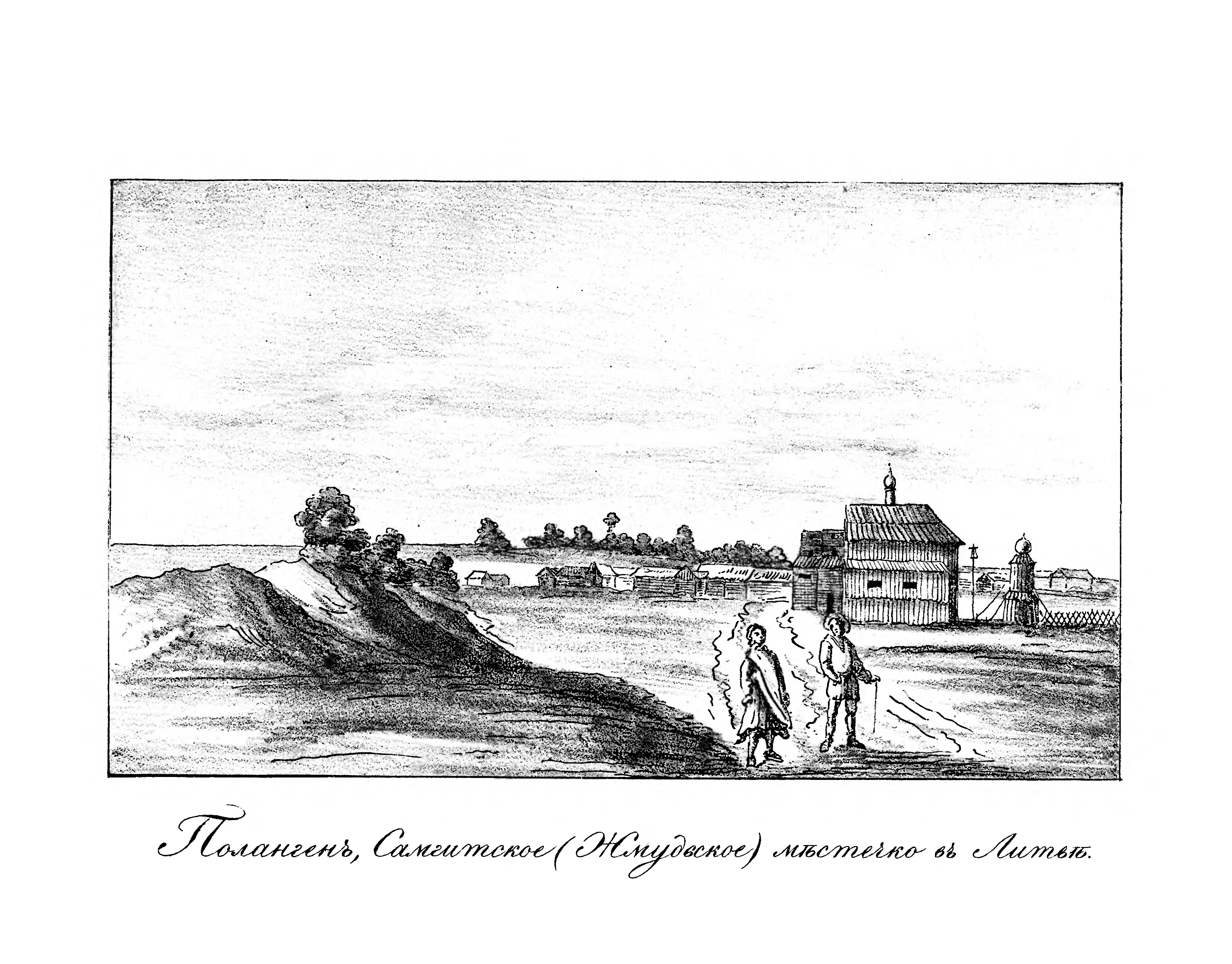
Palanga in 1661

Between the 13th and 15th centuries, the inhabitants of Palanga had to confront the Teutonic Knights in the south and the Livonian Brothers of the Sword in the north. Their adversaries were unable to achieve their goal of capturing the Lithuanian sea-coast from Klaipėda to Šventoji. Grand Duke Vytautas the Great considered granting Palanga to the Teutonic Knights, however Supreme Duke Jogaila prevented it. Eventually in 1422 Palanga passed to the Grand Duchy of Lithuania under the Treaty of Melno. In 1427 Jogaila saw sea for the first time in Palanga.

The first small wooden Catholic church in Palanga was built in ~1540 at the behest of Grand Duchess Anna Jagiellon.

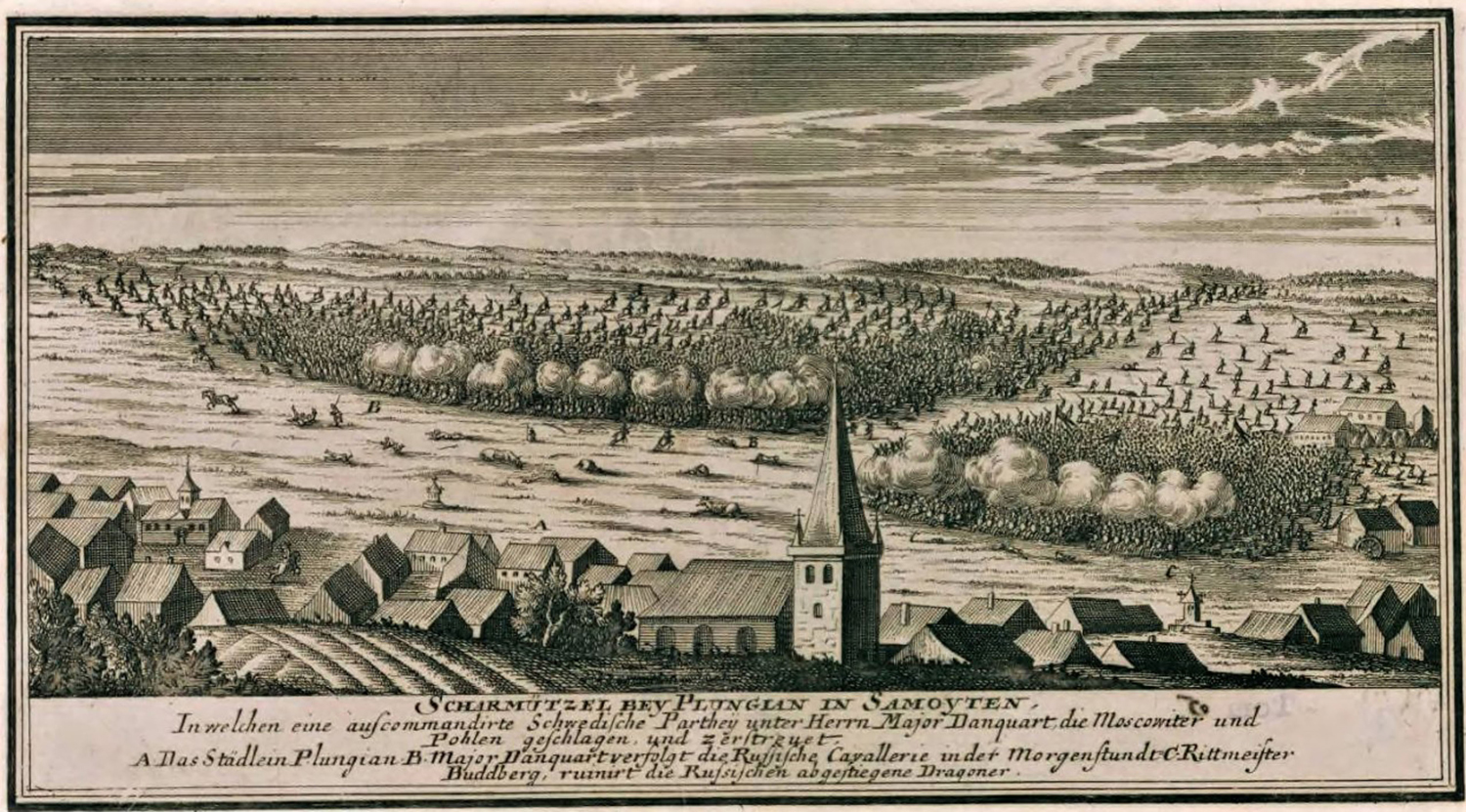
Battle of Palanga in 1705

The harbour of Šventoji gradually developed into a trading centre. British merchants established enterprises in Šventoji in 1685. During the Great Northern War, in which the Polish–Lithuanian Commonwealth allied with Saxony, Denmark and Russia against Sweden, the Swedish Army ravaged Palanga, destroyed the harbour at Šventoji, and blocked up the entrance with rocks in 1701.

After the Third Partition of Poland and Lithuania in 1795 the town became a part of the Russian Empire. In 1819 Palanga was transferred from the Vilna Governorate to Grobin County (Latvian: Grobiņa) of the Courland Governorate.

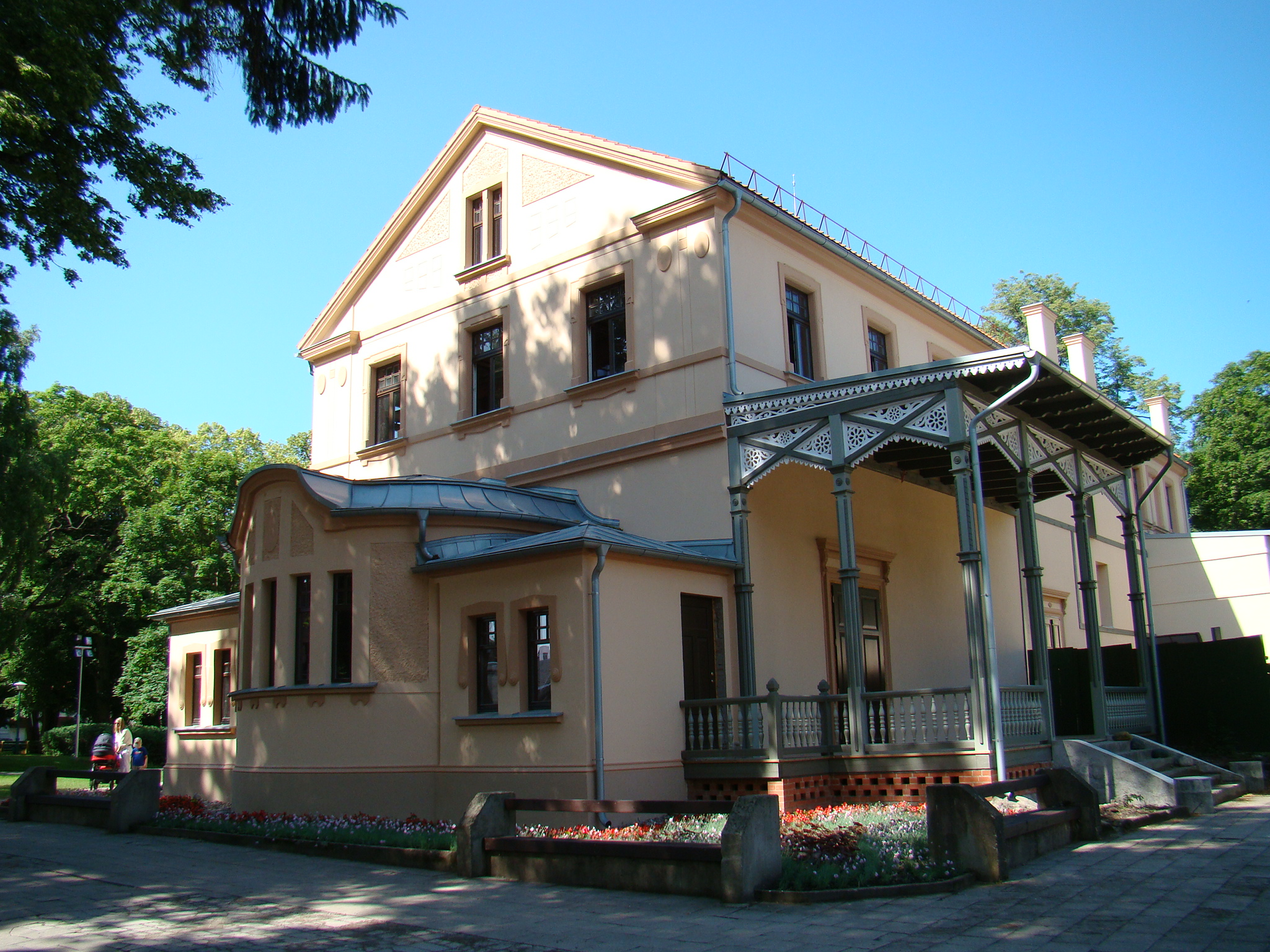
Kurhauzas (German: resort house)

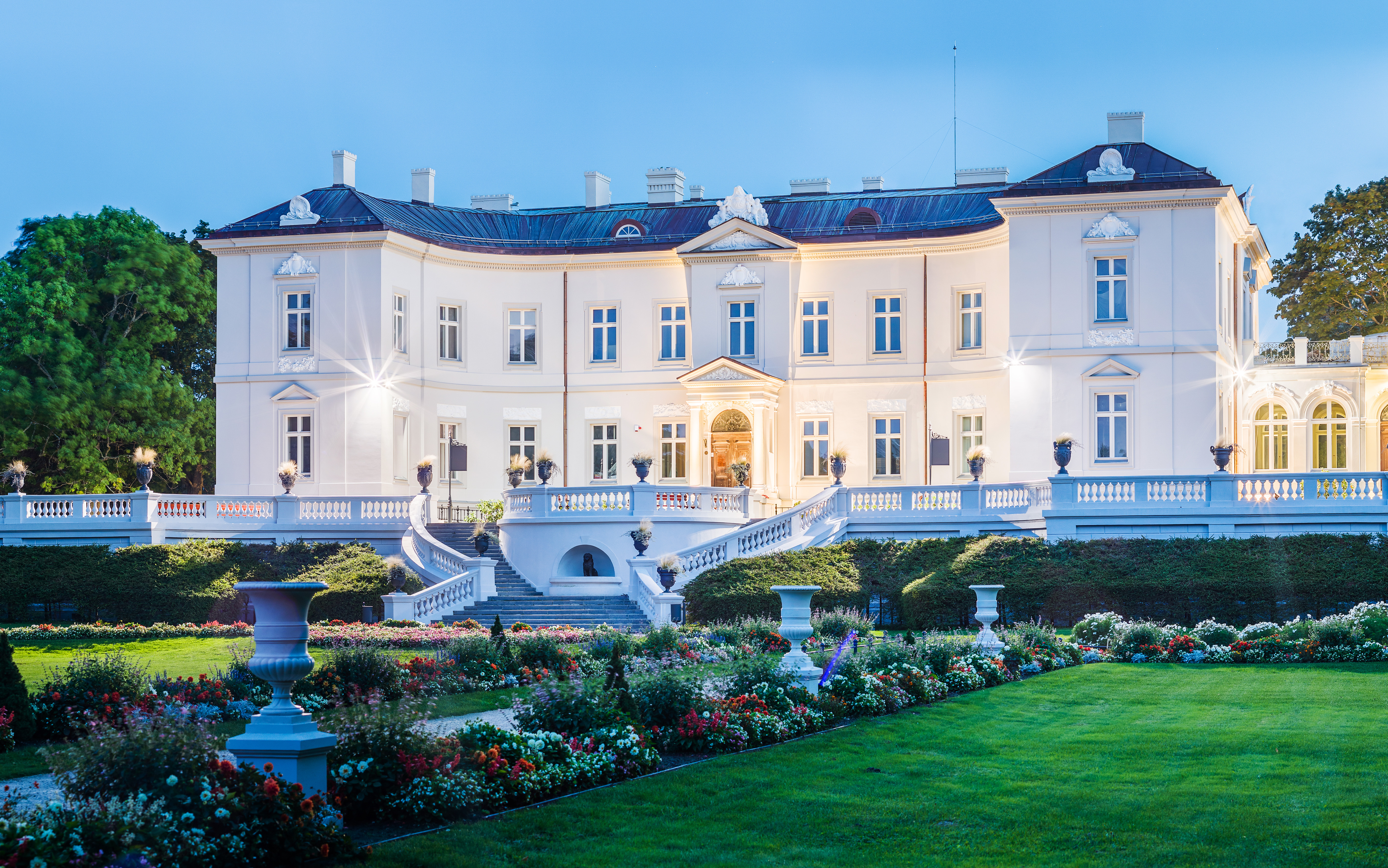
The Tiškevičiai Palace houses the Amber Museum

In 1824, the manor of Palanga was purchased by Count Michał Tyszkiewicz. His grandson Józef Tyszkiewicz built a pier and engaged ships to transport passengers and bricks to nearby Liepāja. Palanga began to develop as a resort in the early 19th century. The pier has been a favourite spot for taking a stroll and other recreation since 1892. Józef Tyszkiewiczs's son, Feliks Tyszkiewicz, commissioned the construction of the neo-Renaissance Tiškevičiai Palace, built by the famous German architect Franz Schwechten in 1897.

The French landscape architect Édouard André designed a large park around the palace, between 1897 and 1907. The palace became a favourite gathering place for concert performances. Amongst the good friends and associates of Feliks Tyszkiewicz was the notary, Jonas Kentra.

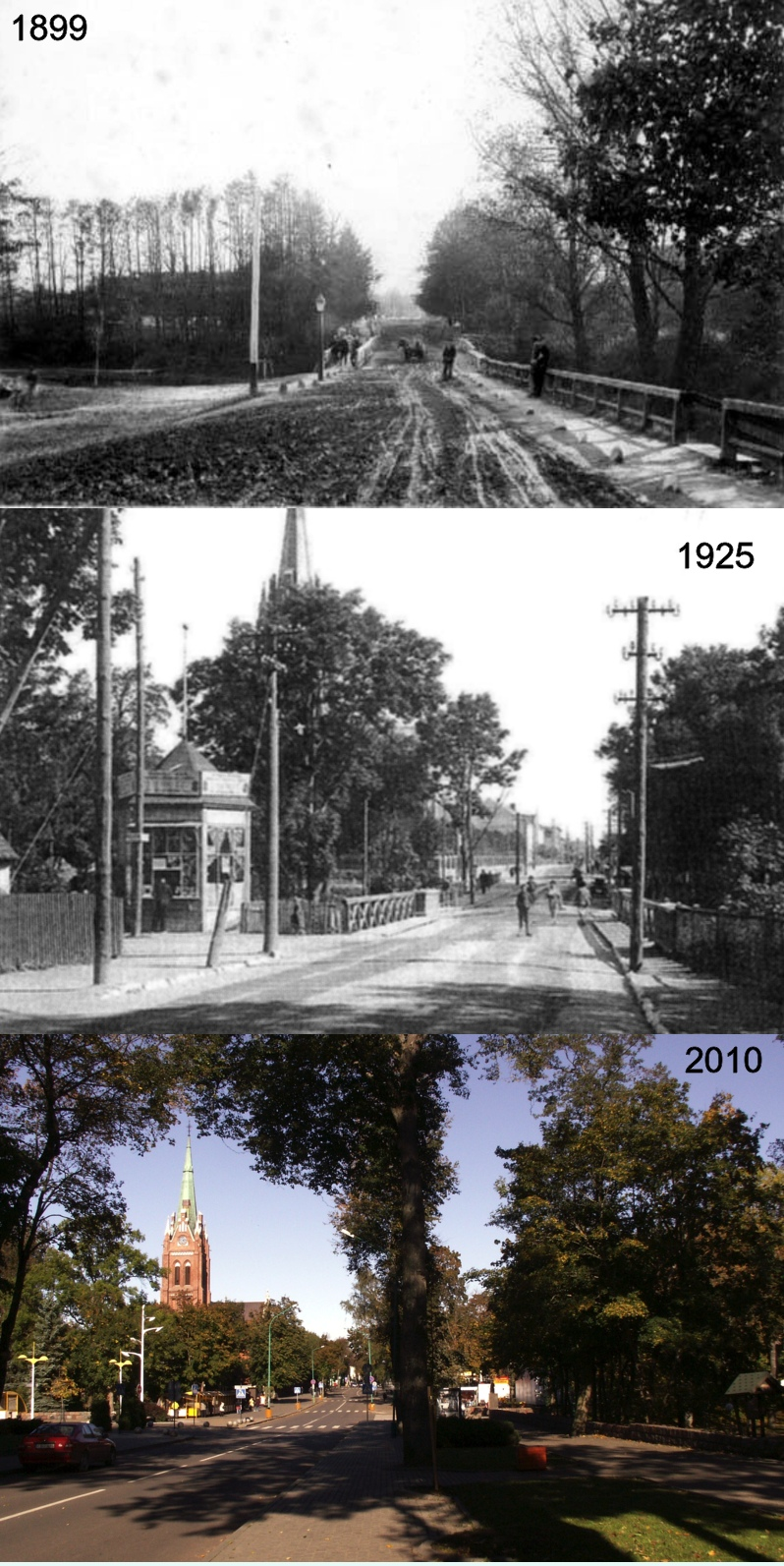
Liepojos-Vytauto streets 1899–1925–2010

Following the Lithuanian press ban of 1864, Palanga became an important location for the smuggling of Lithuanian publications from the west. The Rev. Marcijonas Jurgaitis, physician Liudas Vaineikis, and notary Jonas Kentra, played significant roles in this activity. After Kentra obtained official permission, a public performance featuring the comedy, America in the Bathhouse (Amerika pirtyje), was performed in the Lithuanian language. This had previously not been permitted. However, later the Tsarist authorities deported Vaineikis and twenty-five other people to Siberia in 1901.

In 1919, after the breakup of the Russian Empire, Palanga temporarily became a part of Latvia, like the rest of the Courland Governorate. Since this time, Palanga (together with some other areas) was part of territorial dispute with Latvia. After unsuccessful negotiations it was decided to invoke an international arbitration. In 1921, after Lithuanian exchange of its Aknysta town, Brunava Parish and some other villages with Latvia, Palanga was peacefully transferred to Lithuania following a Lithuanian-Latvian treaty and giving Lithuania access to the sea. In 1926, there was still a significant Latvian minority. A popular among Lithuanians saying of the event at the time was "we exchanged our land with out land".

During World War II, the town was occupied by the Soviet Union from 1940, then by Nazi Germany from 1941, then again by the Soviet Union from 1944.

Before World War II, nearly half the population of the town was Jewish. The production of decorative objects and jewellery made from amber found on the seashore, for which Palanga is famous, was formerly a Jewish industry. Many Jews also earned their livelihood by providing various services for summer vacationers. Between the world wars Jews were active in local government, serving on the city council as mayor or deputy mayor. The deteriorating economy resulting from antisemitism caused many to immigrate to South Africa, the United States, and Palestine. Soon after the outbreak of the German-Soviet war on June 22, 1941, Palanga was occupied by the Germans and all the Jews were concentrated at the bus station. The males aged 13 and above were taken outside the town and were forced to dig pits that they were later shot into, in total 111 were killed. The women and children were held for a month in the synagogue, and then executed.

The Tiškevičiai Palace's park was converted into a botanical garden in 1960. Today it contains two hundred different types of trees and shrubs, including an oak tree planted by President Antanas Smetona. The palace, now the Palanga Amber Museum, has an extensive collection of amber jewellery and other artifacts. Symphonic concerts as well as other musical festivals and events take place in the summer, usually in the evening.

== Location ==
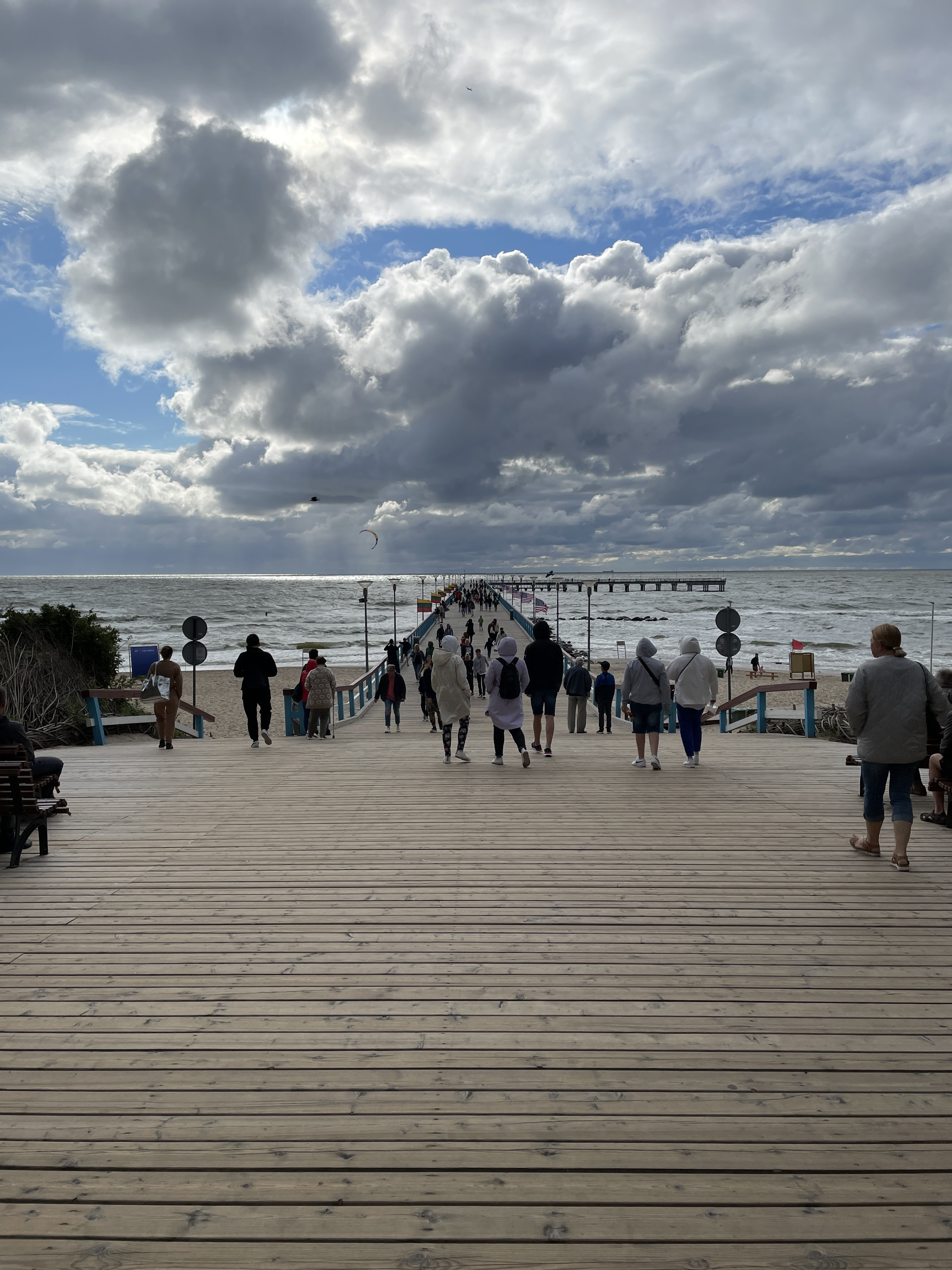
The pier in Palanga

Palanga is a resort city through which the Šventoji and Rąžė (Samogitian: Ronžē) rivers flow into the Baltic Sea. Rąžė was formerly known as Alanga and gave Palanga its name: Palanga, which literally means on the Alanga River. The Palanga municipality extends 24 kilometres from Nemirseta in the south to the Latvian border in the north. Palanga is subdivided into Nemirseta, Vanagupė, Kunigiškiai, Manciškiai, and Šventoji – five neighbouring fishing villages which were united into one city following administrative changes to the area. After the Klaipėda Region was ceded to Germany in March 1939, Nemirseta was the northernmost village of East Prussia; conversely Palanga was a border checkpoint between Russian-occupied Lithuania and Germany.

== Transportation ==
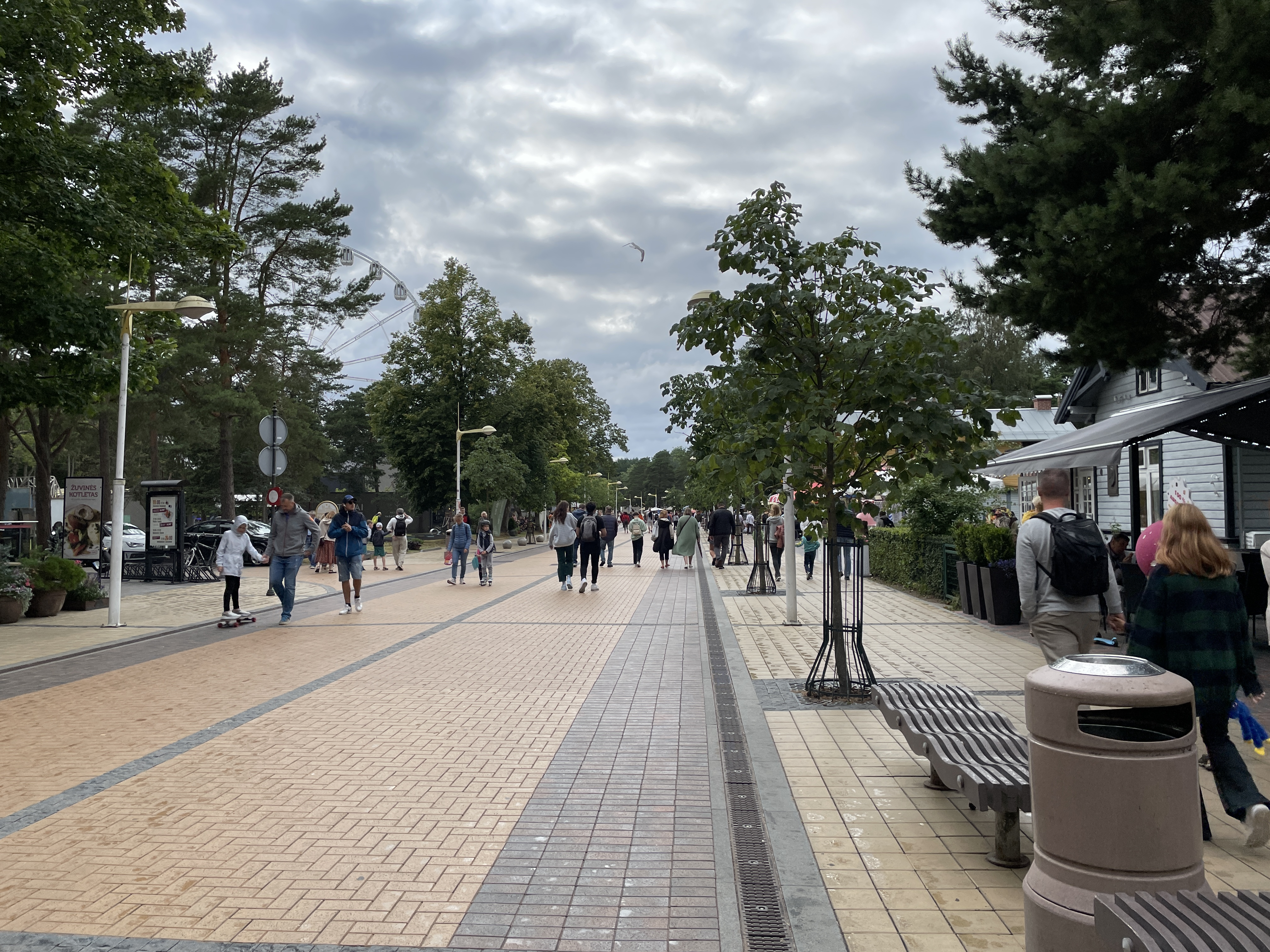
Basanavičius Street in Palanga

The municipality is accessed by roads from Klaipėda and Šiauliai. There is no railway in the municipality (the closest rail connection is in Kretinga, the capital of the Kretinga district municipality). Palanga's International Airport, the third largest in Lithuania, offers connecting flights to Scandinavia, Germany, Ireland, United Kingdom, Poland and to the biggest city in Baltic States - Riga, Latvia. The airport is located between Palanga and Šventoji, and it handles more flights in the summer season including Antalya, Milan, Barcelona due to the resort nature of the municipality.

== Educational institutions ==
=== Schools ===
- Palanga Old Gymnasium (High School) (for students from 14 to 19)
- Palanga Vladas Jurgutis Progymnasium (for students from 6 to 14)
- Baltic School (for students from 6 to 14)

=== Art schools ===
- Palanga Stasys Vainiūnas Art School

=== Preschools ===
- Nykštukas
- Žilvinas
- Gintarėlis
- Ąžuoliukas

== Places of interest ==
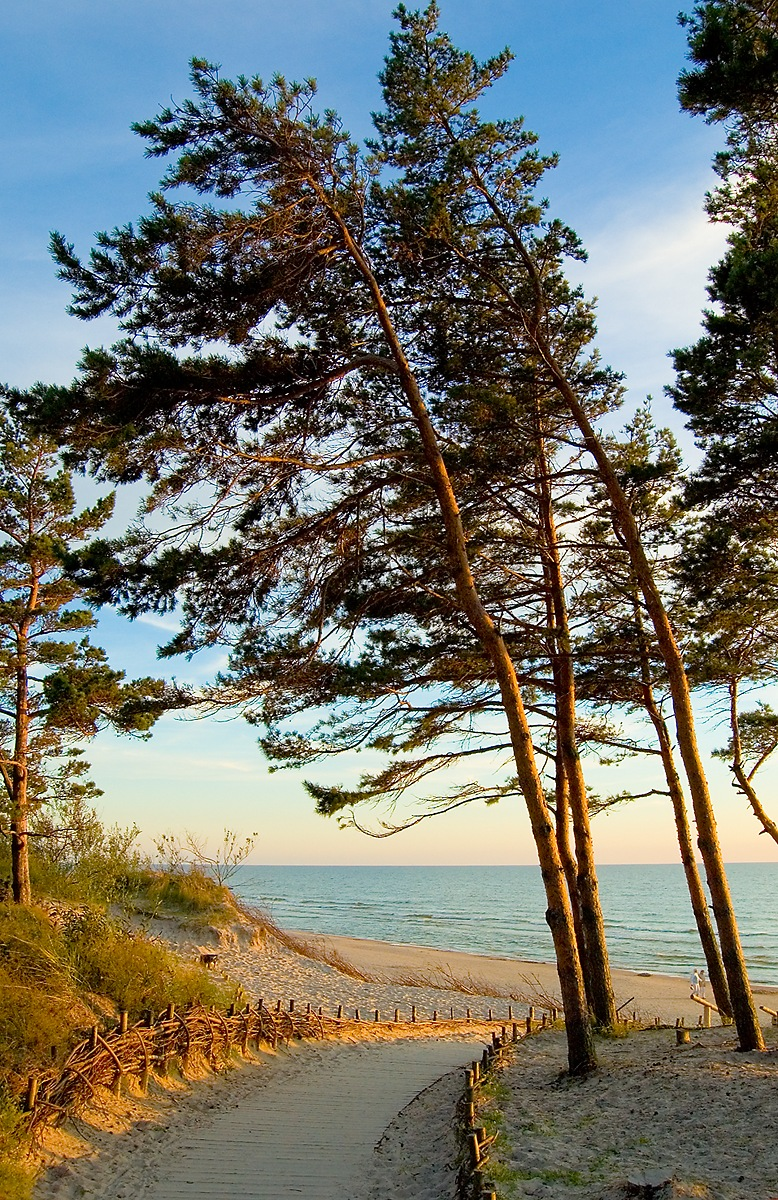
Path heading to the beach

Palanga Concert Hall

In the summer, many tourists come to visit and stay in Palanga, both for its beaches and to enjoy the maritime atmosphere. There is a carnival centred on Jonas Basanavičius Street, which is a pedestrian-only thoroughfare during the high season. There are dozens of restaurants, bars, rides, and other forms of entertainment. A new observation wheel opened in ~2021 scaling 40 meters. It is claimed its to be the tallest wheel in all of the baltic states. At the end of Jonas Basanavičius Street is Palanga Pier, a wooden structure extending about 470 meters into the Baltic Sea.

The aforementioned Palanga Amber Museum is open to the public, as are as the museum's extensive botanical gardens. Anaičiai Ethnographic Cemetery holds a collection of 19th- and early 20th-century graves. In the Sculpture Garden, one can find 28 contemporary statues by artists from Armenia, Estonia, Latvia, Lithuania and Ukraine.

Also found in Palanga is one of the oldest operating pharmacies in Lithuania. It was established in the mid-19th century.

Of interest is Villa Anapilis built in 1898 and recently restored to its interwar state. Its name refers to the Anapilis mountain, allegedly the place of the afterlife in Lithuanian pagan mythology.

== Notable people ==
- Birutė (died 1382) was the second wife of Kęstutis, Grand Duke of Lithuania, and mother of Vytautas the Great
- Julius Brutzkus (1870–1951) a Lithuanian Jewish historian, scholar, and politician.
- Boris Brutskus (1874–1938) a Russian economist, forced into exile by the Bolshevik government in 1922
- Vladas Jurgutis (1885 in Joskaudai near Palanga – 1966 in Vilnius) a Lithuanian priest, economist, and professor
- Liudvikas Narcizas Rasimavičius (born 1938) a Lithuanian politician. In 1990 he was among those who signed the Act of the Re-Establishment of the State of Lithuania
- Edmundas Benetis (born 1953) a Lithuanian architect
- Raimundas Palaitis (born 1957) a Lithuanian politician, Minister of the Interior from 2008 to 2012
- Indrė Šerpytytė (born 1983) a Lithuanian artist in London, works with photography, sculpture, installation and painting
- Renaldas Seibutis (born 1985) a Lithuanian professional basketball player
- Karolis Laukzemis (born 1992) a Lithuanian professional footballer

== Twin towns – sister cities ==
Palanga is twinned with:

- Bergen auf Rügen, Germany
- Bucha, Ukraine
- Eilat, Israel
- Jūrmala, Latvia
- (Georgia (country)) Kobuleti, Georgia
- Liepāja, Latvia
- Simrishamn, Sweden
- Ustka, Poland

The city was previously twinned with:

- Chernyakhovsk, Russia
- Primorye, Russia
- Svetlogorsk, Russia
- Svetlogorsky District, Russia

== See also ==
- Ošupis
- Latvians in Lithuania
