= Ošupis =

Coordinates: 55°58′45″N 21°04′16″E

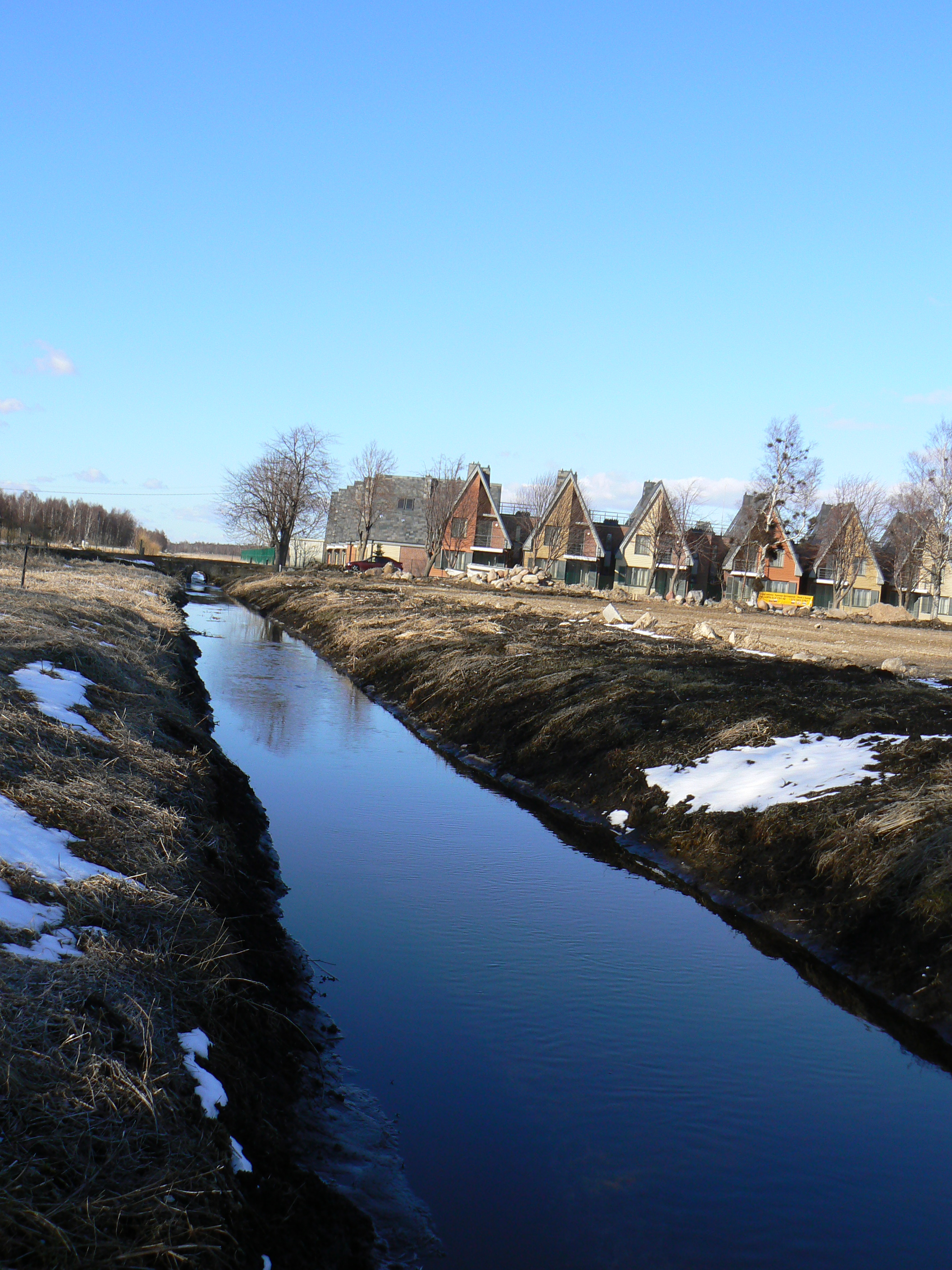
- Ošupis to the east from Užkanavė

Location
- Country: Lithuania

Physical characteristics
- Source
  - location: Kontininkai, Palanga, Lithuania
  - elevation: 5.7 m (6.2 yd)
- Mouth
  - location: Baltic Sea (Užkanavė, Palanga, Lithuania)
- Length: 5.4 km (3.4 mi)
- Basin size: 7.5 km^{2} (2.9 sq mi)

The Ošupis is a stream in the west of Lithuania in the municipality Palanga in Klaipėda County in Samogitia. The total length of the stream is 5.4 kilometres (3.4 mi) and the drainage basin area is 7.5 square kilometres (2.9 sq mi).

It begins in Kontininkai (in the district of Palanga). It flows at first to the north then from the village Užkanavė to the west and afterward joins the stream Kaniavosis and flows into the Baltic Sea near Užkanavė (north of Palanga).

== Etymology ==
Ošupis is composed from the Lithuanian words ošti meaning "foam" and upė meaning "river".
