= Palanga Pier =

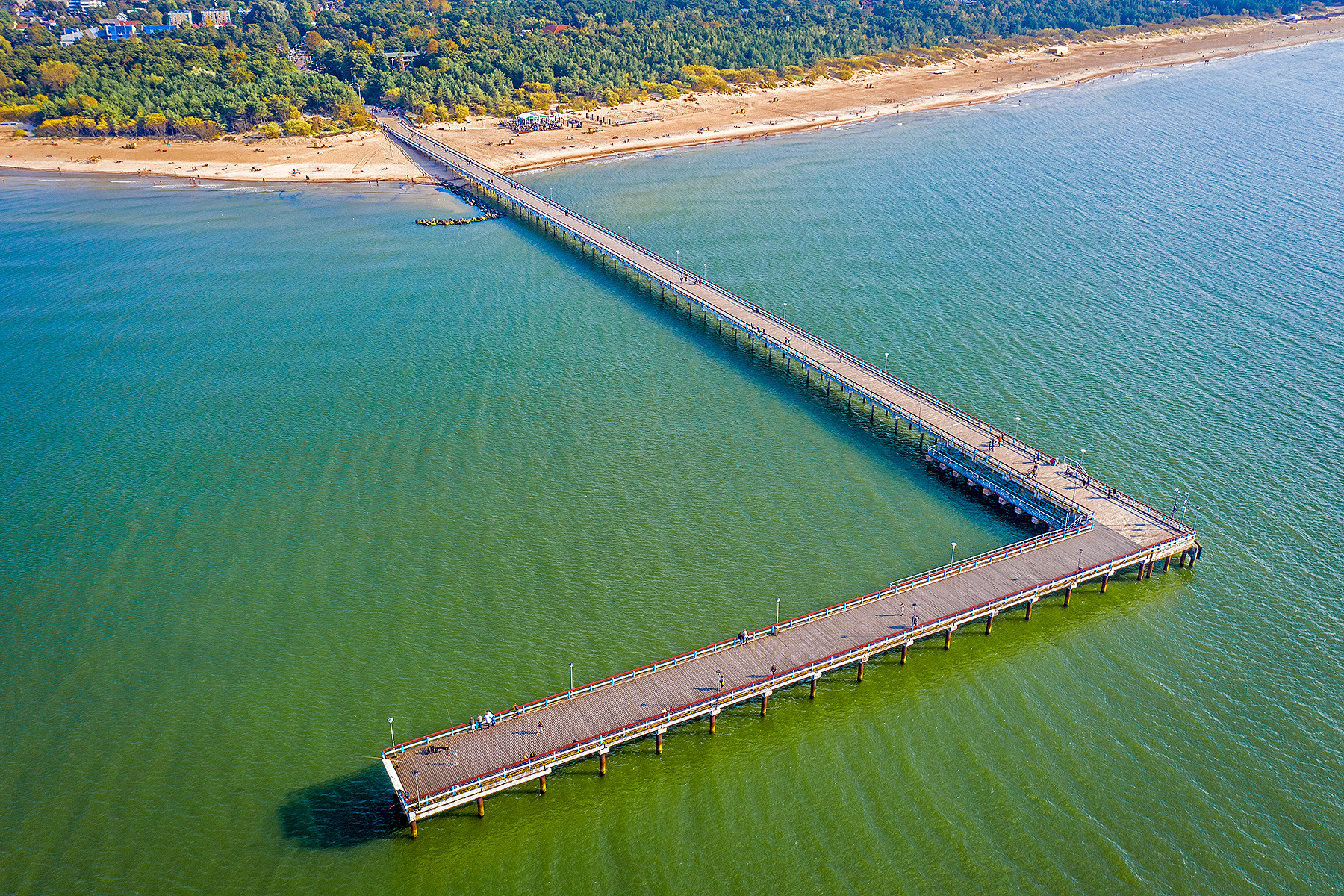
- Palanga Pier in autumn
- Type: Pleasure Pier
- Location: Palanga, Lithuania
- Coordinates: 55°55′13″N 21°02′46″E
- Official name: Palangos tiltas (Lithuanian)

Characteristics
- Construction: 1589, 1882, 1998
- Total length: 470 metres (1,540 ft)

History
- Opening date: 1998 (the latest reconstruction)

Palanga Pier (Lithuanian: Palangos tiltas) is a wooden pier to the Baltic Sea located in Palanga, the most popular and biggest summer resort in Lithuania.

== History ==
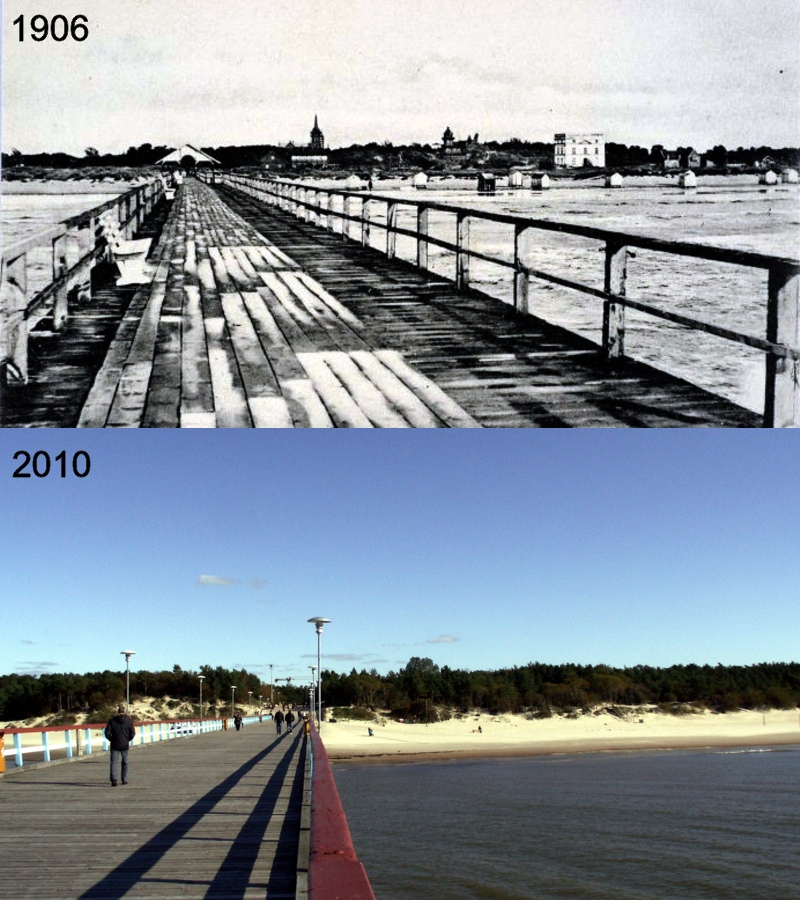
Palanga Pier in 1906 and in 2010

In 1589 Grand Duke Sigismund III Vasa granted the right to expand the Port of Palanga to the English people, who built a bridge to the sea, installed a stone jetty and prepared the seabed for the development of maritime transport.

In 1882 Juozapas Tiškevičius II supervised the construction of a new Palanga Pier with a length of 380 metres. It was primarily dedicated for exporting bricks, however, during summer time it was used for walks. It had an attic (Italian: altana) in the beginning of the pier for protecting pedestrians from rain and was connected to a tram line. Since 1892 it was dedicated for the use of pedestrians only and become a popular sea-side destination for walks.

In 1998 the latest reconstruction of the Palanga Pier was completed, and the renewed pier's length became 470 metres.

== Gallery ==
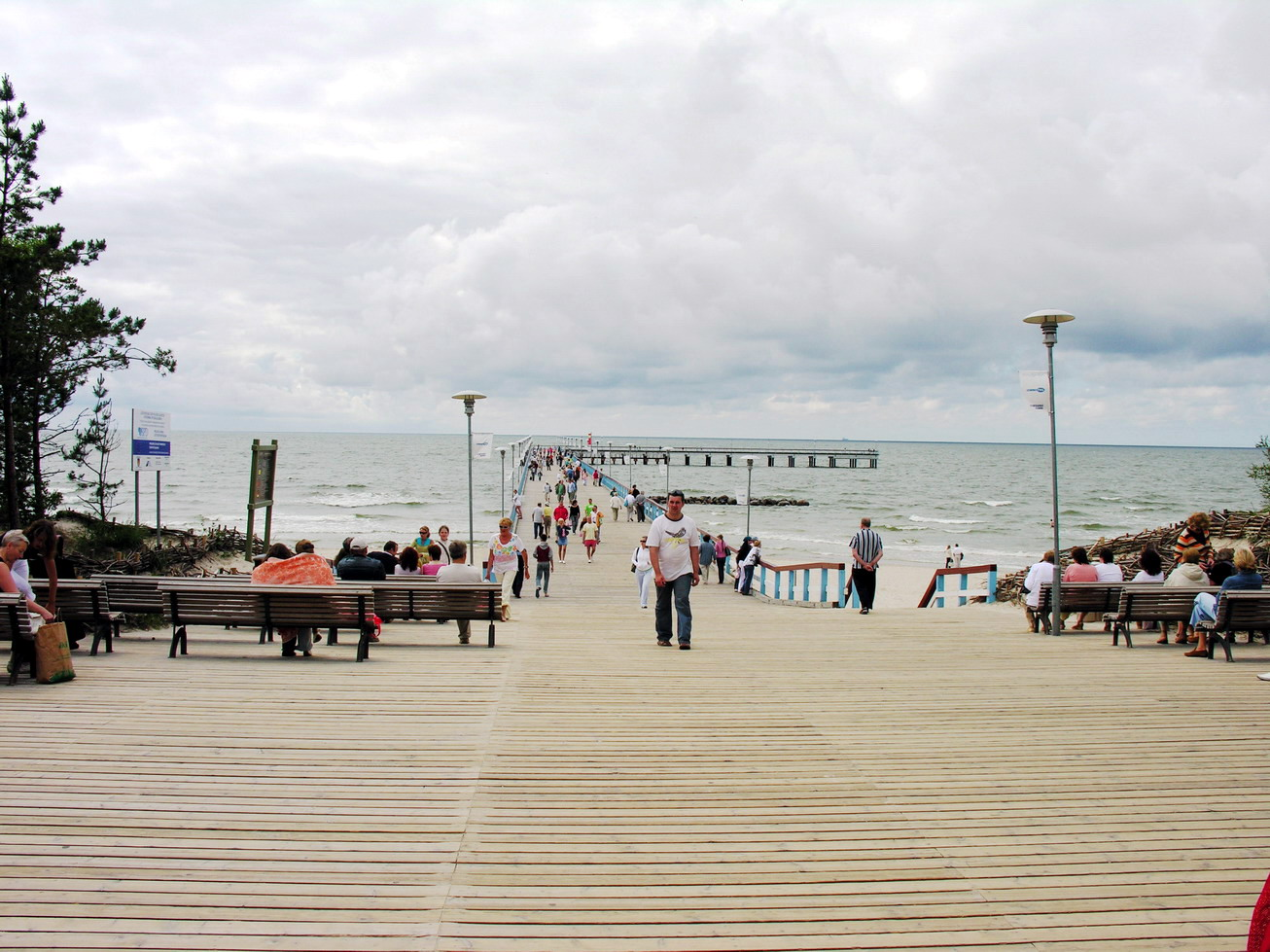
Entrance to the pier from the central Jono Basanavičiaus Street

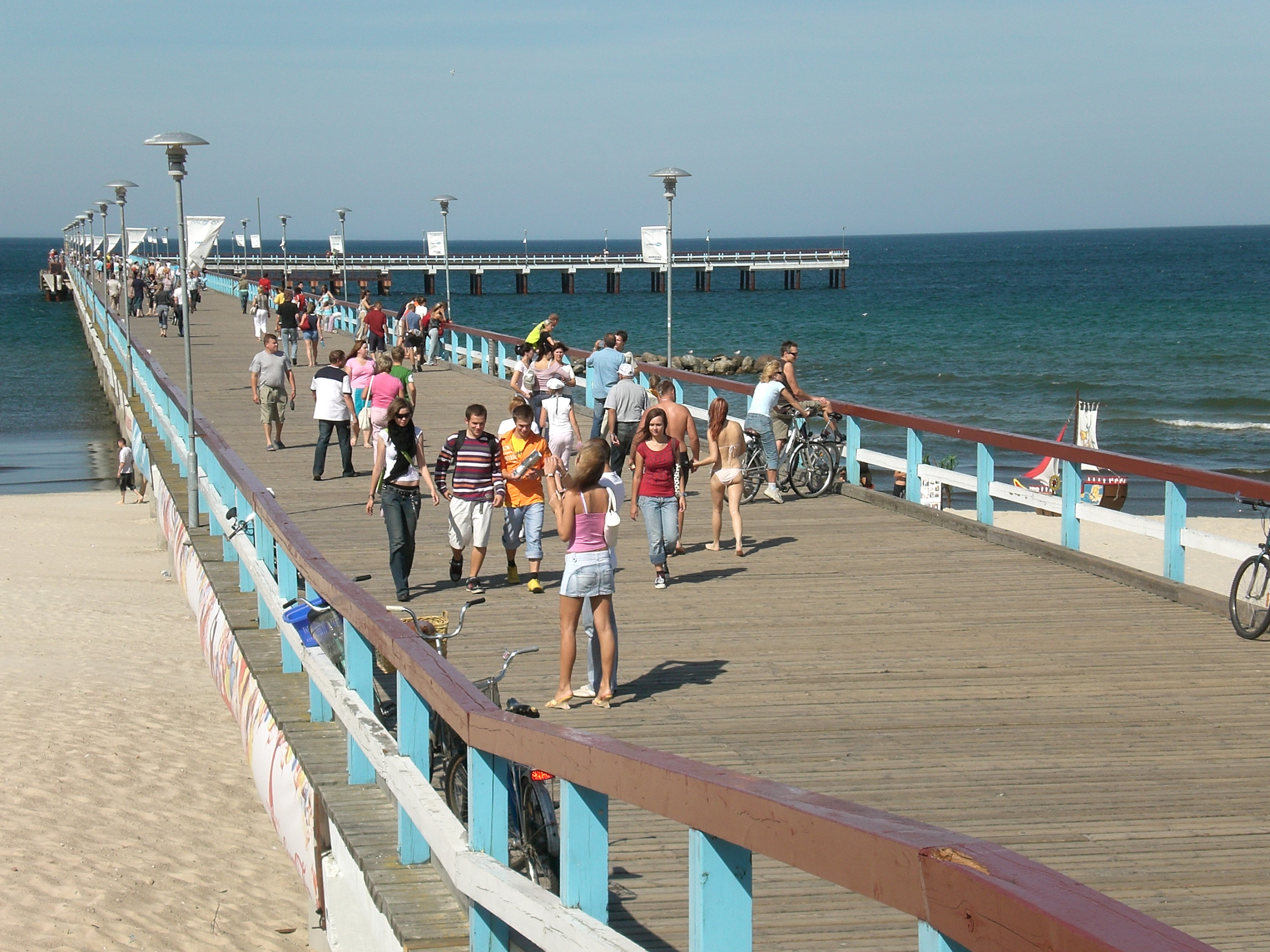
Pedestrians and bicycle drivers on the pier

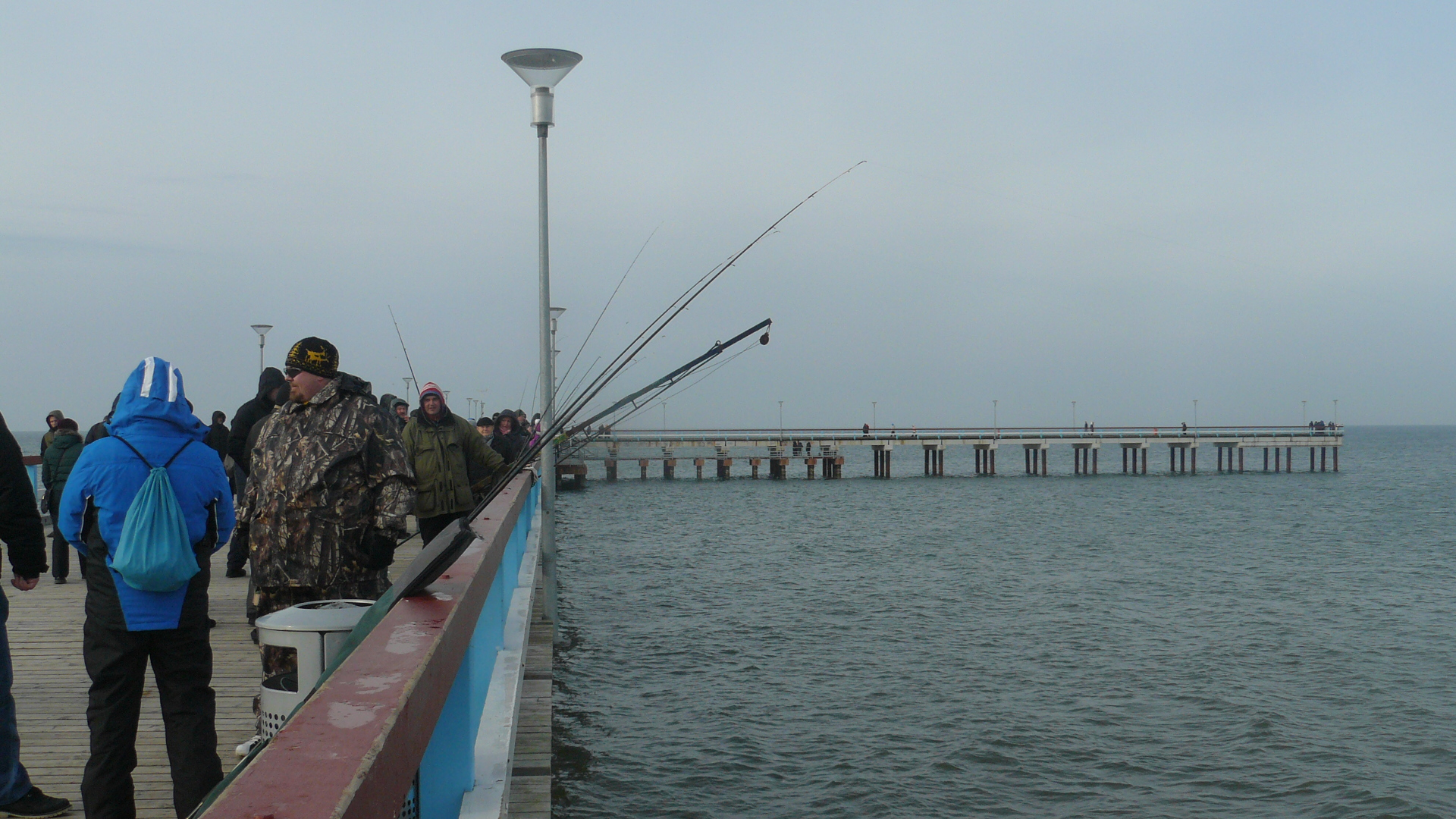
Fishermen on the pier

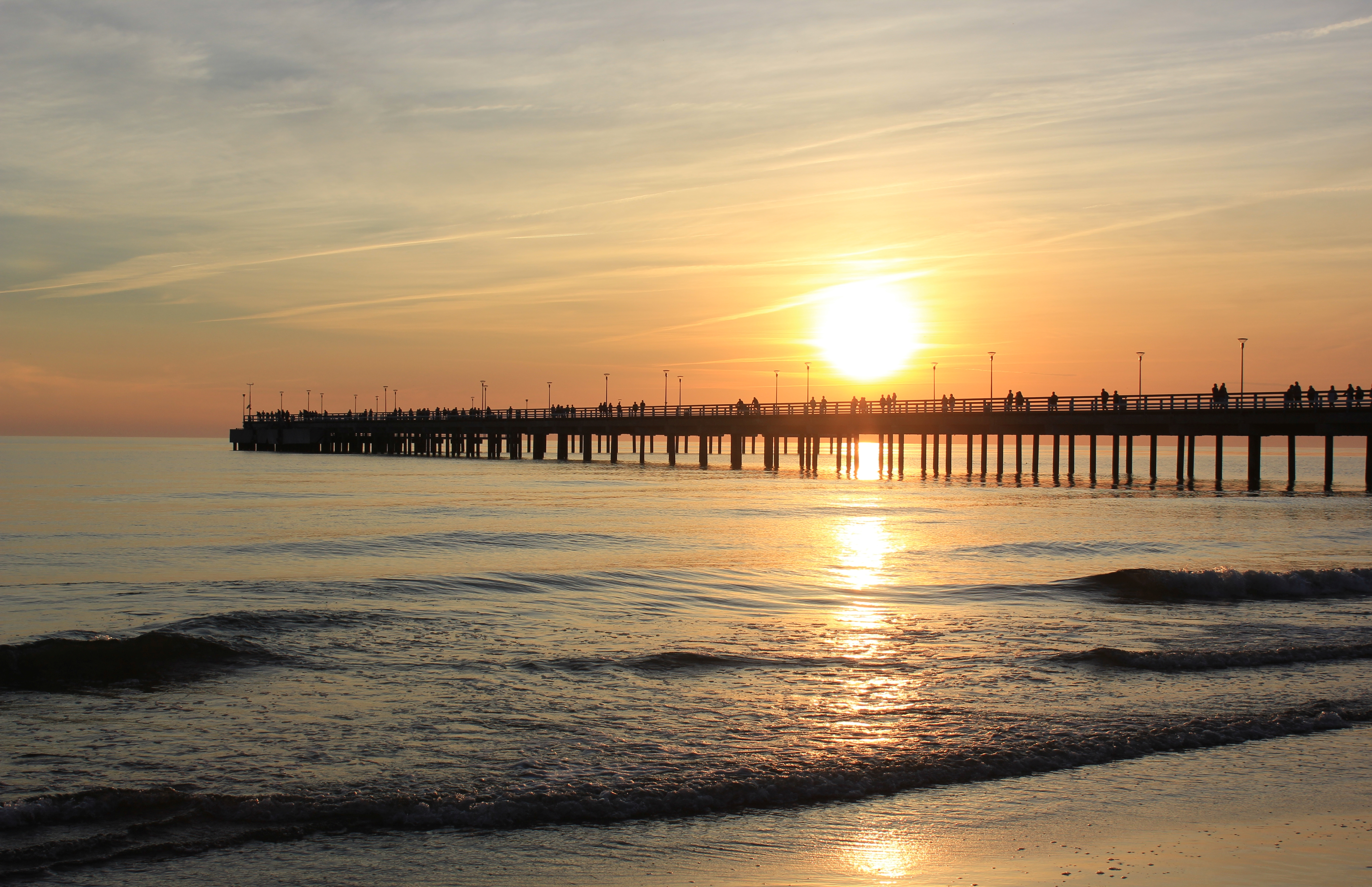
Sunset near the pier

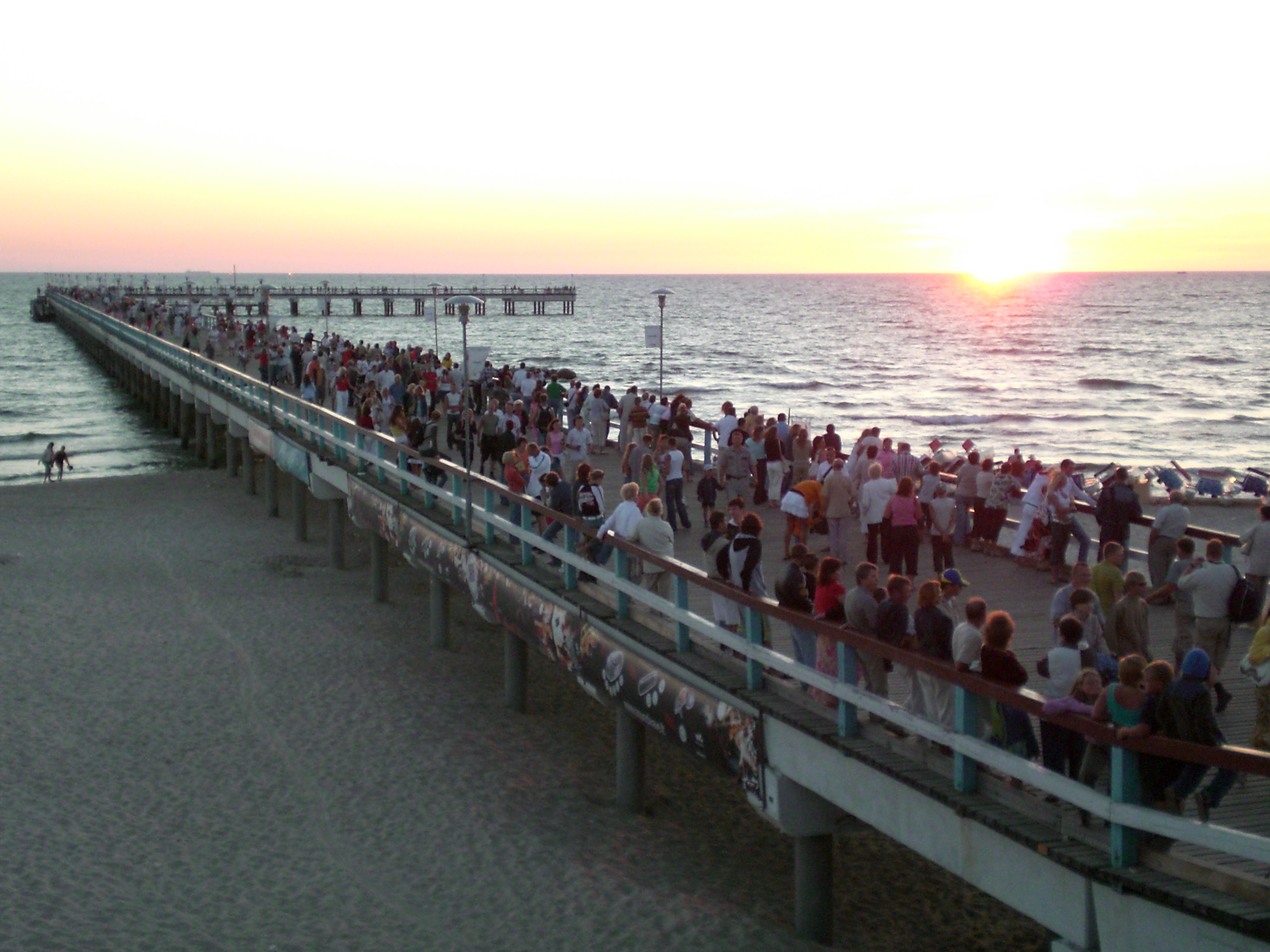
Pedestrians observing twilight on the pier

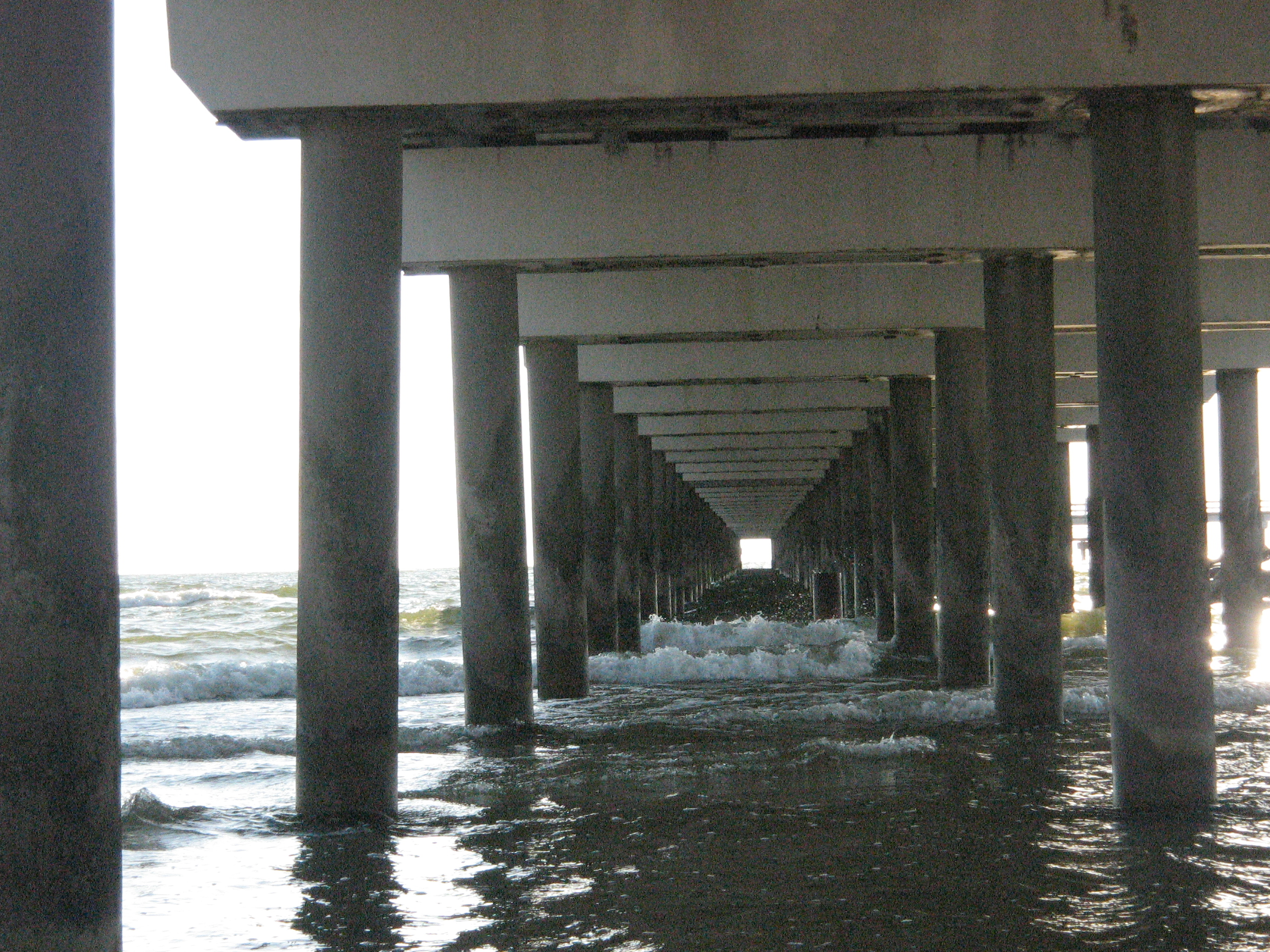
Under the pier
