= Edmundas Benetis =

Lithuanian architect (born 1953)

Edmundas Benetis (born 12 August 1953 in Palanga) is a Lithuanian architect.
