= 2023 deaths in the United States (July–September) =

- Decades: 2000s; 2010s; 2020s; 2030s
- See also: History of the United States (2016–present); Timeline of United States history (2010–present); List of years in the United States

The following notable deaths in the United States occurred in July–September 2023. Names are reported under the date of death, in alphabetical order as set out in WP:NAMESORT. A typical entry reports information in the following sequence: Name, age, country of citizenship at birth and subsequent nationality (if applicable), what subject was noted for, year of birth (if known), and reference.

== July ==
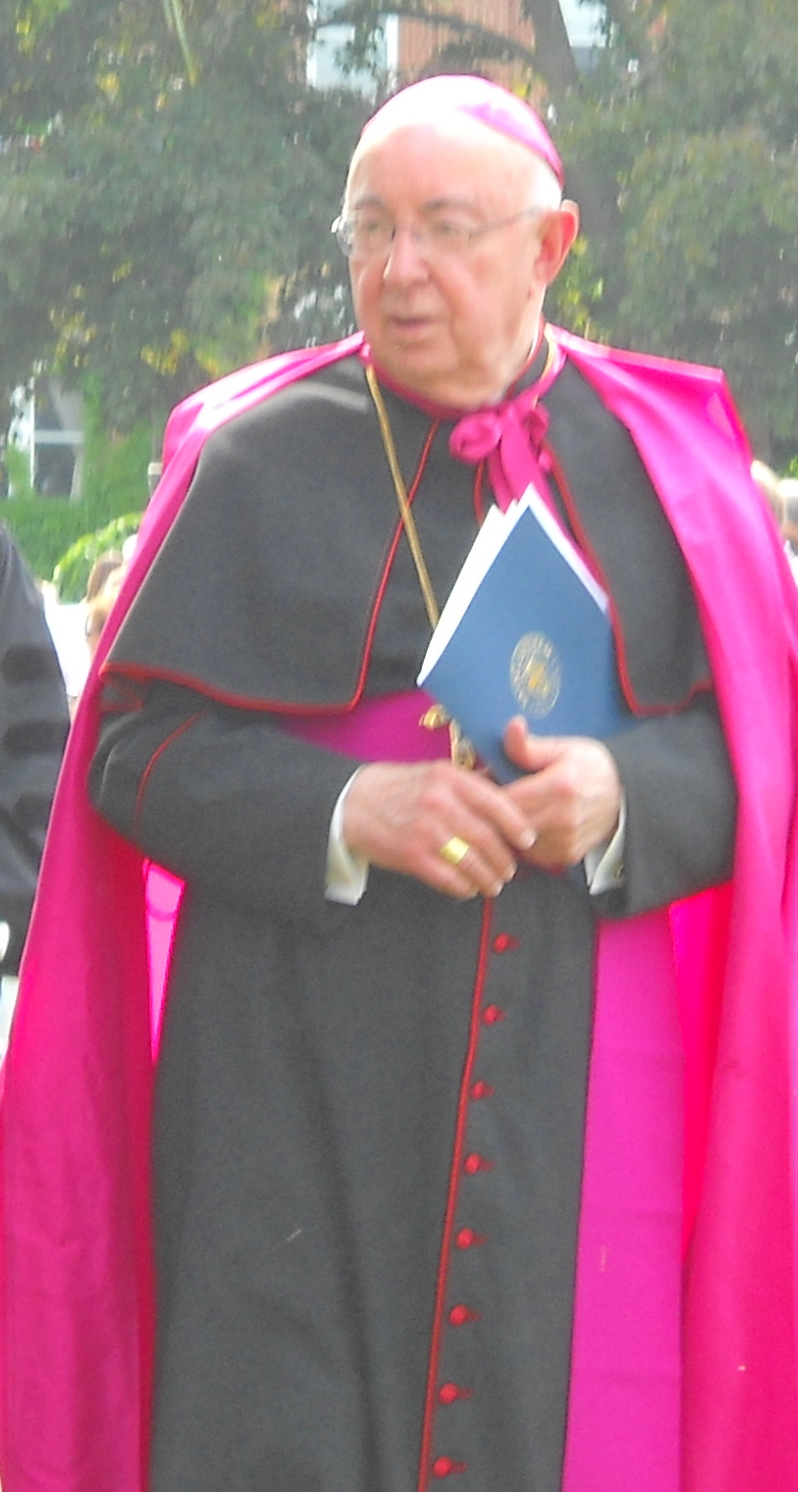
Joseph John Gerry

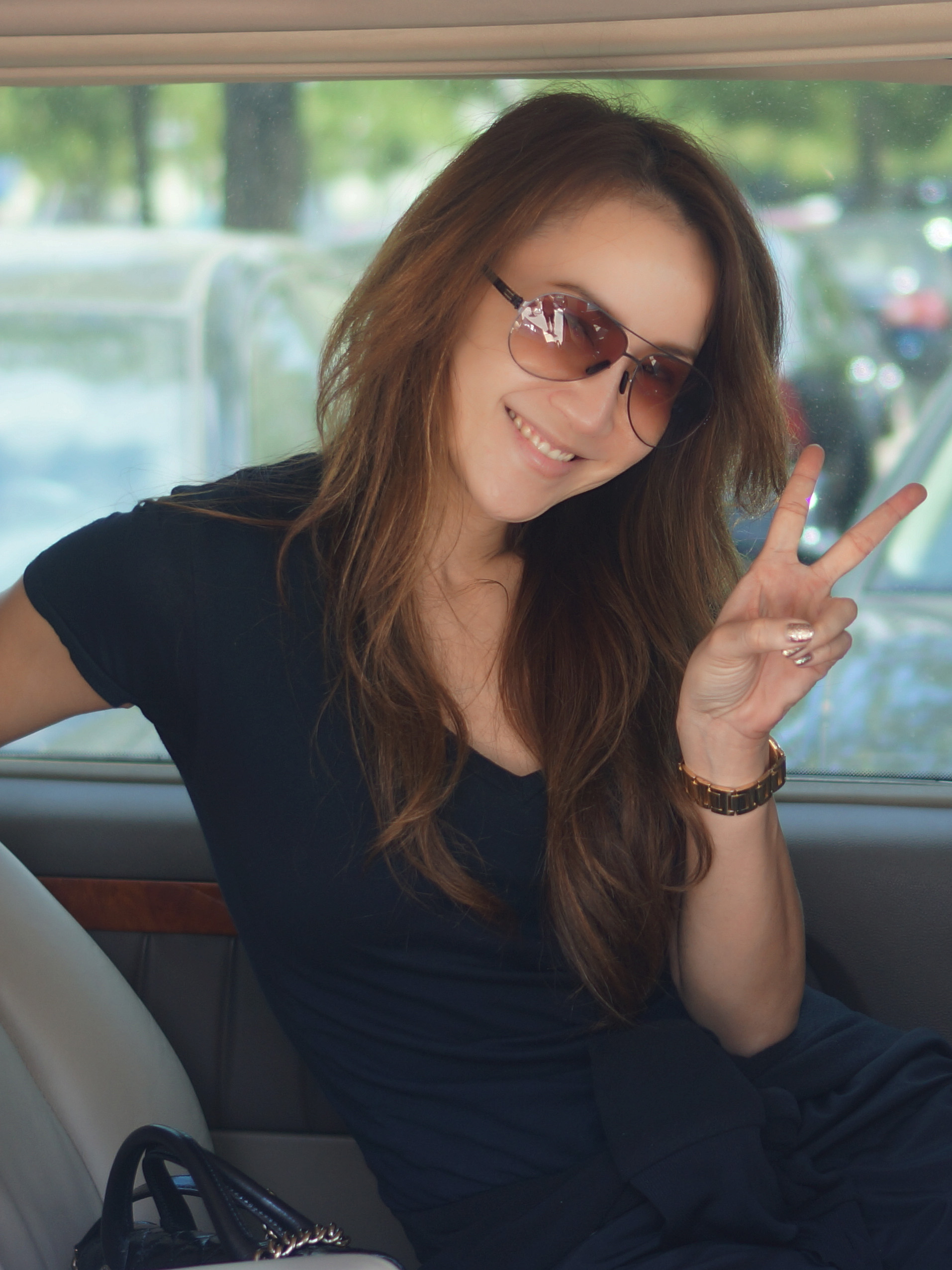
Coco Lee

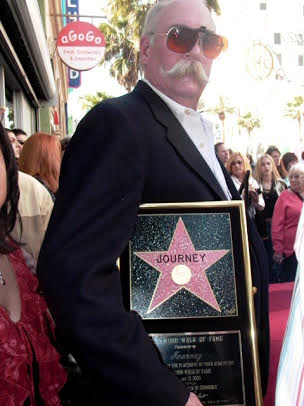
George Tickner

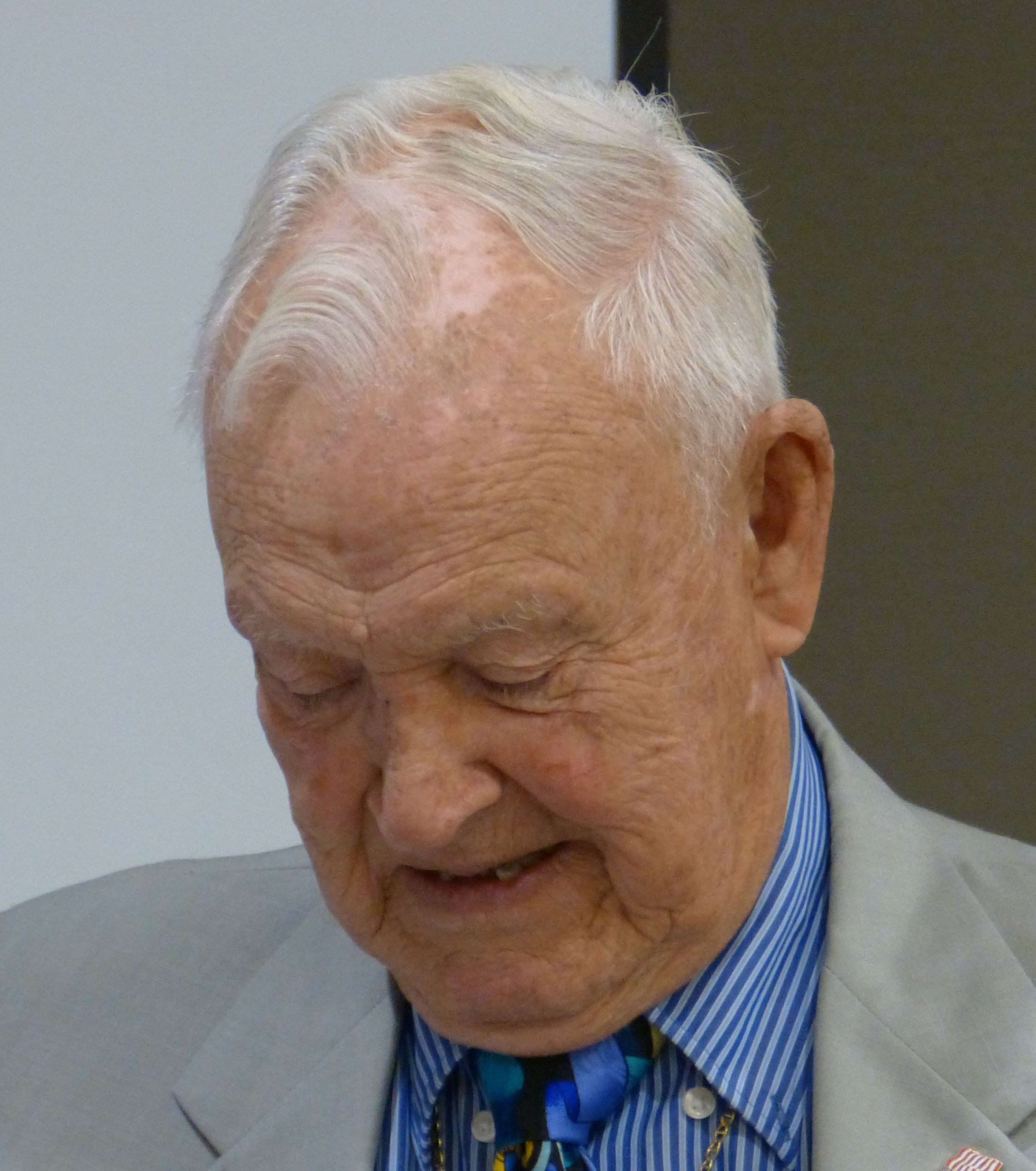
Jimmy Weldon

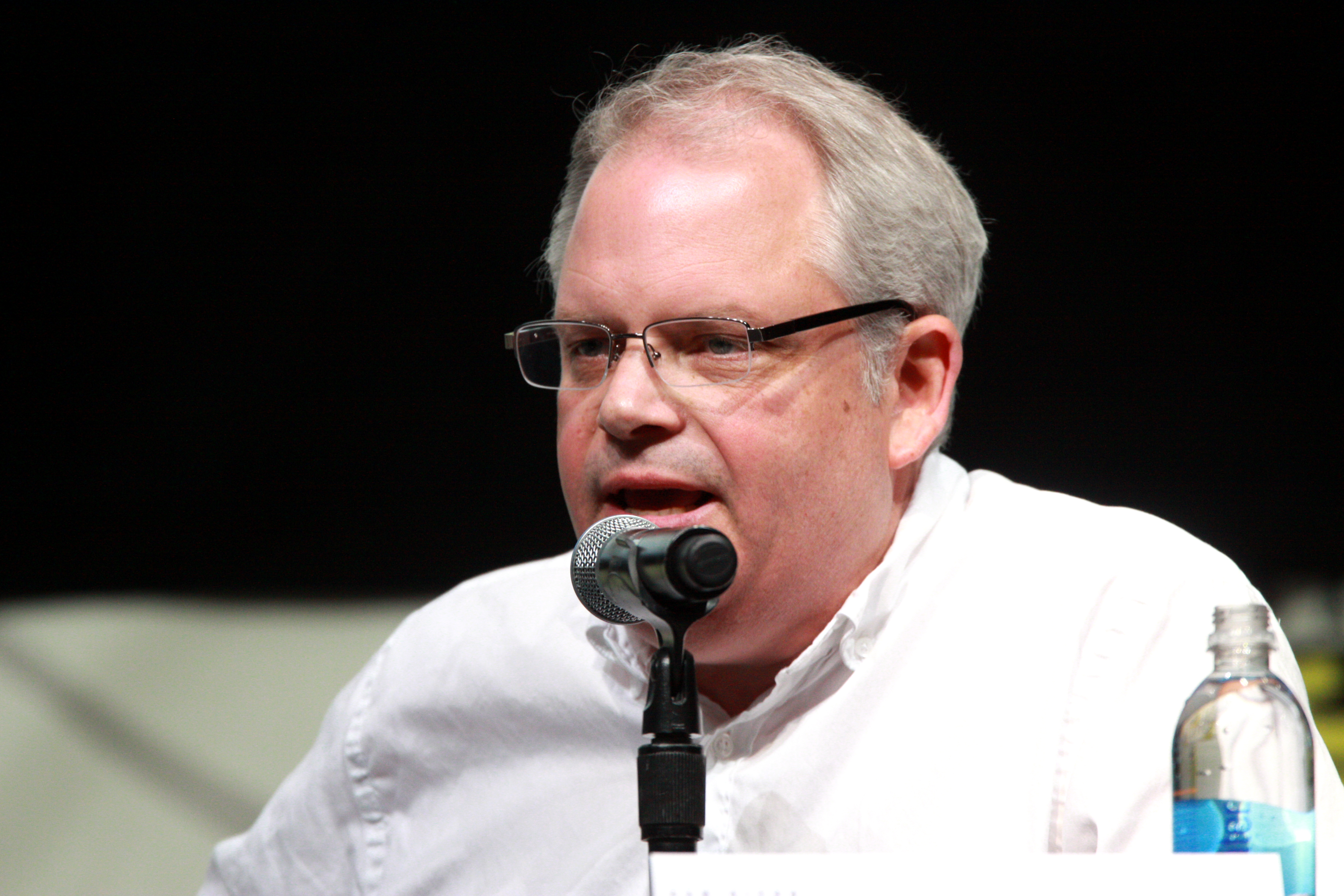
Manny Coto

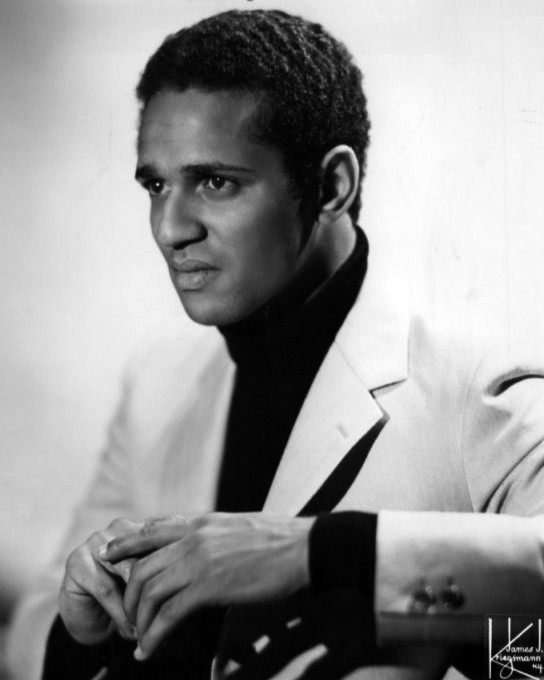
André Watts

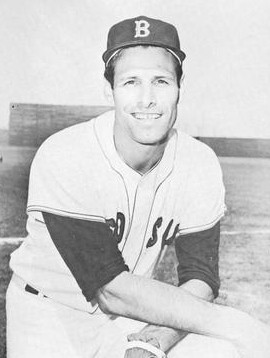
Ed Bressoud

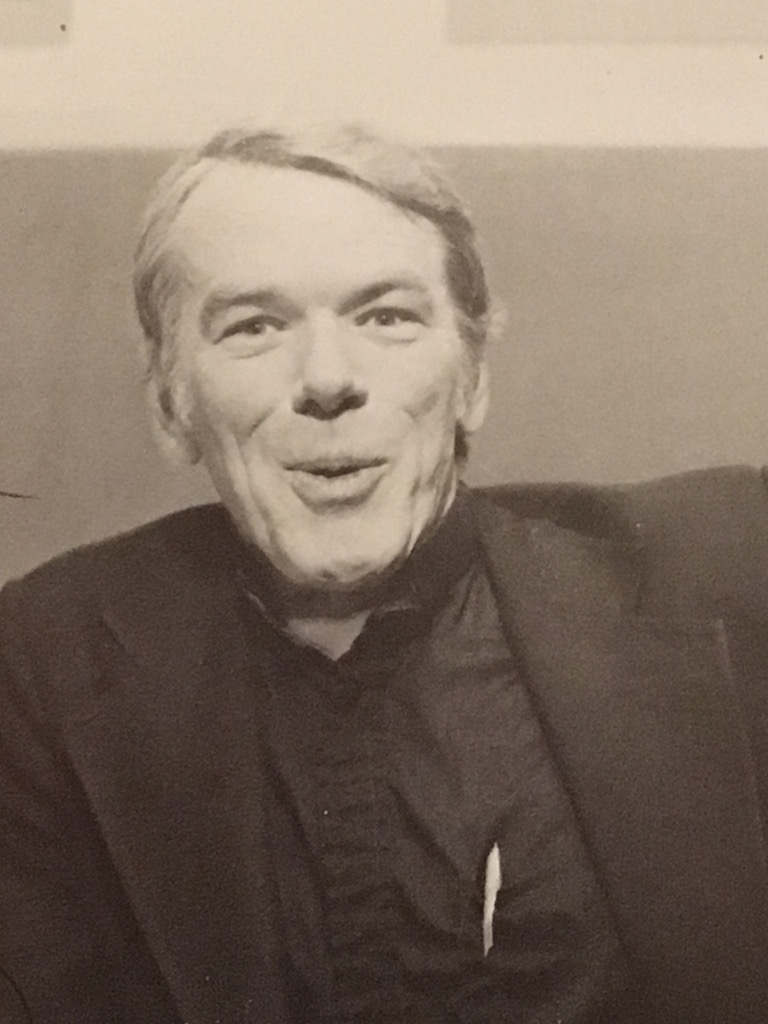
William O'Malley

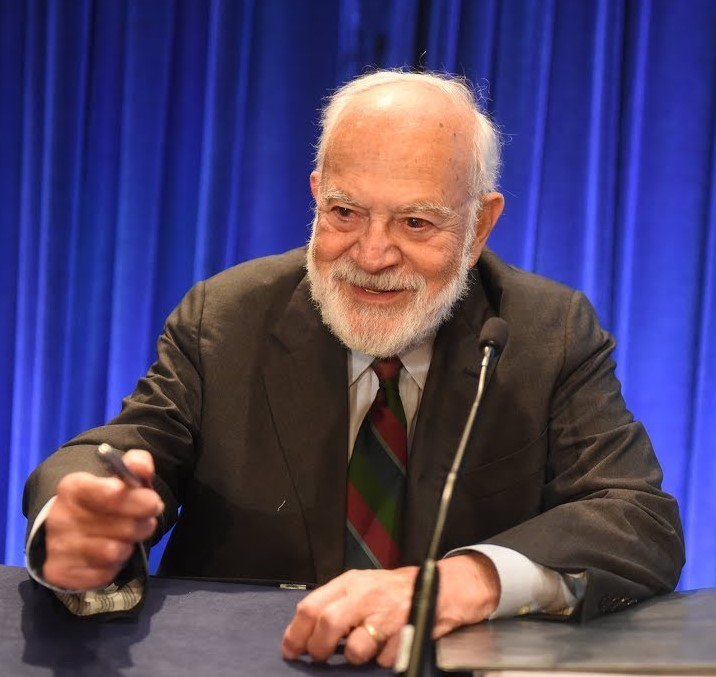
Harry Frankfurt

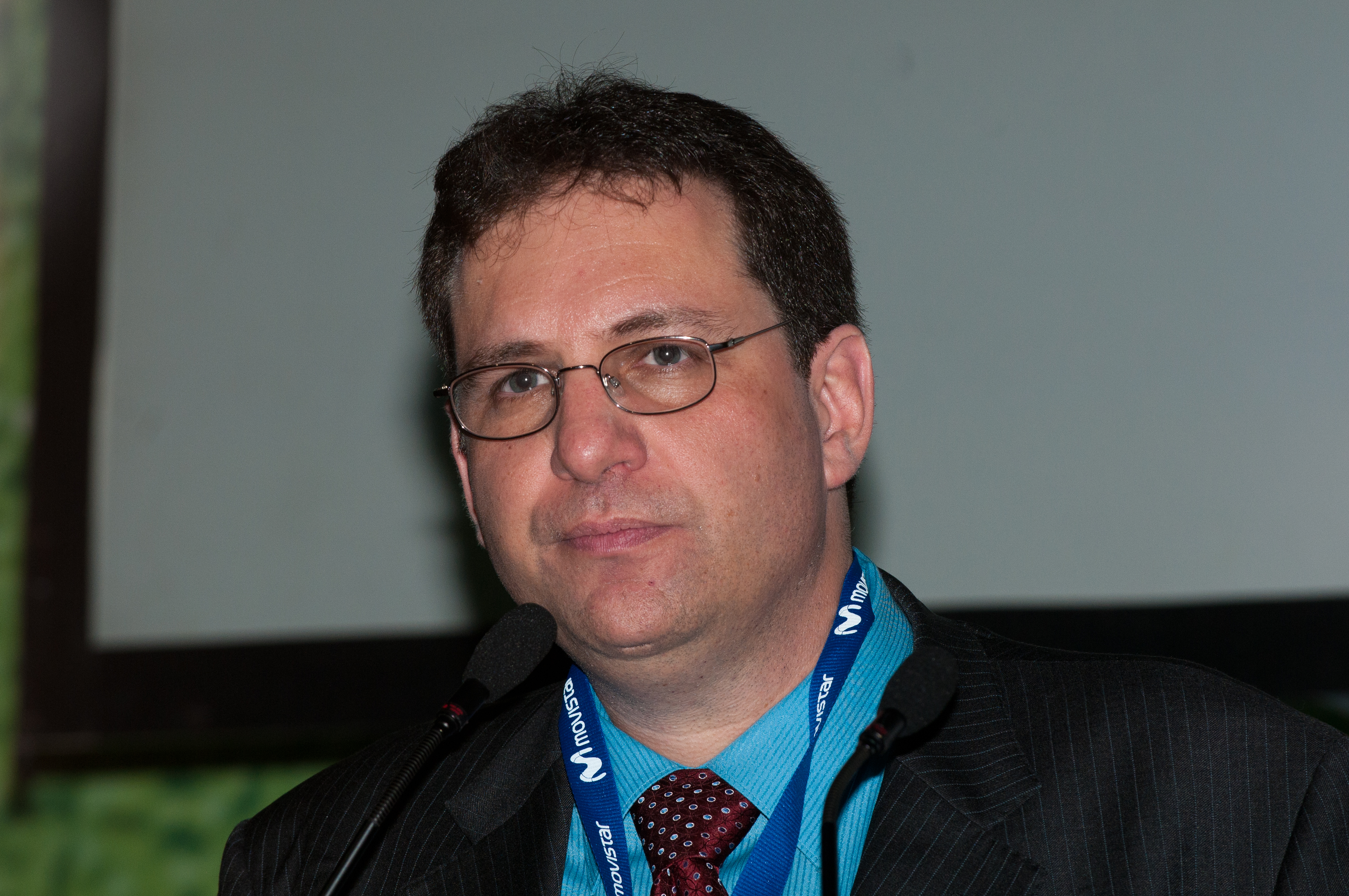
Kevin Mitnick

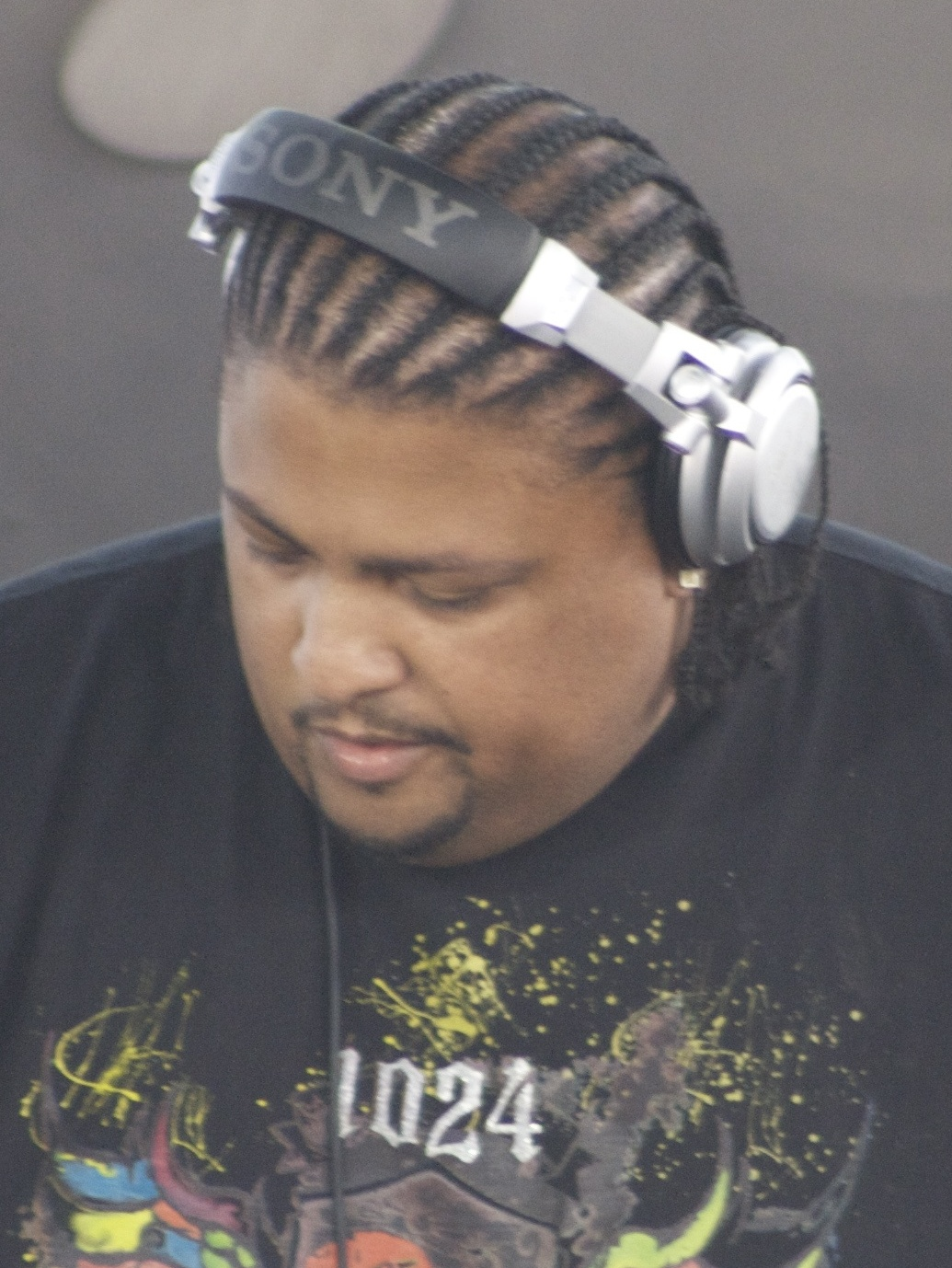
DJ Deeon

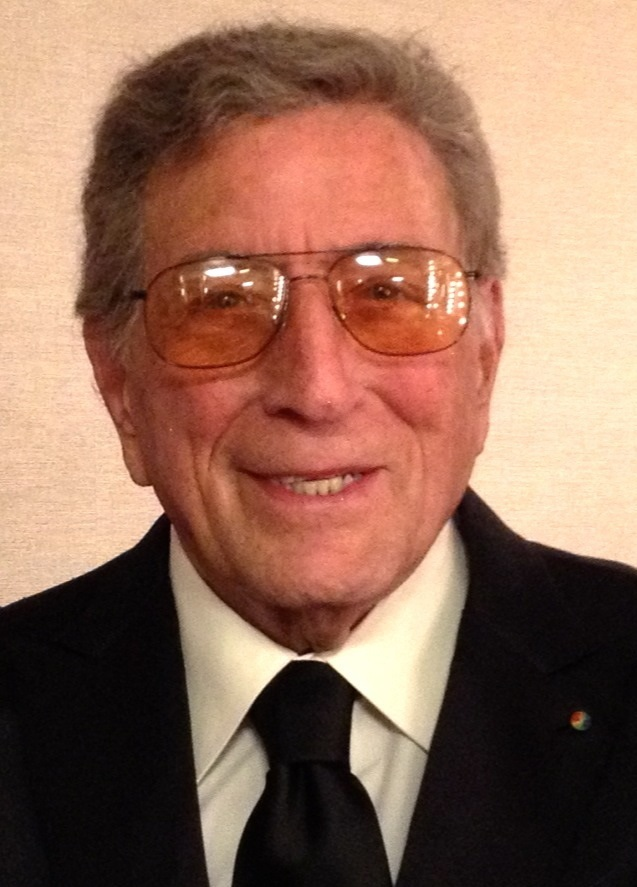
Tony Bennett

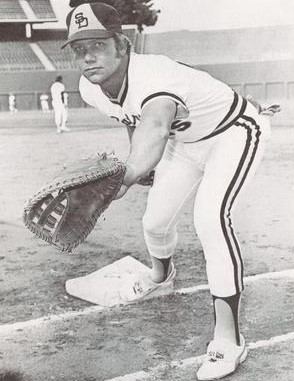
Mike Ivie

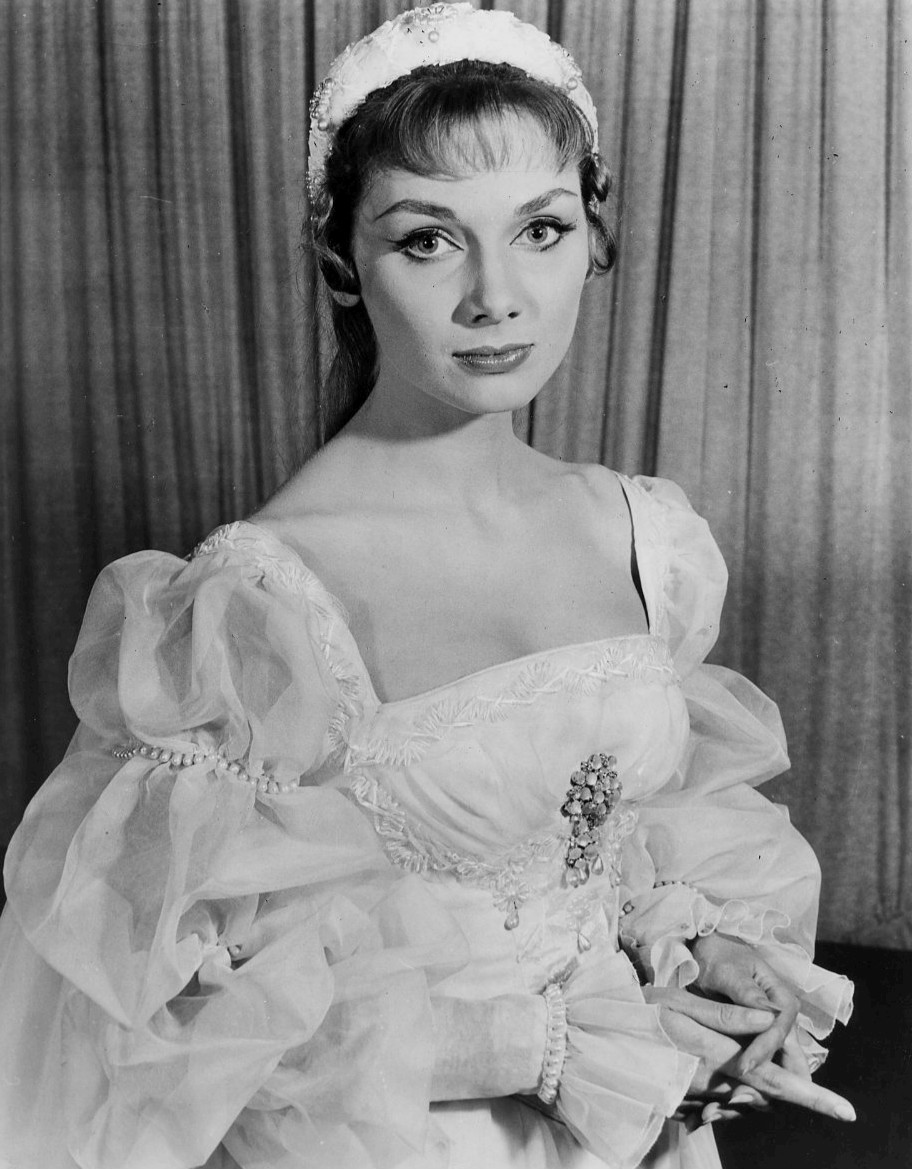
Inga Swenson

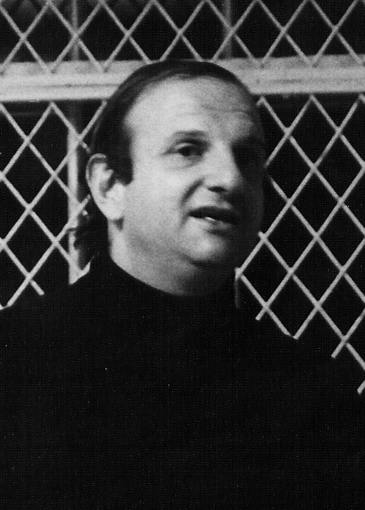
Bo Goldman

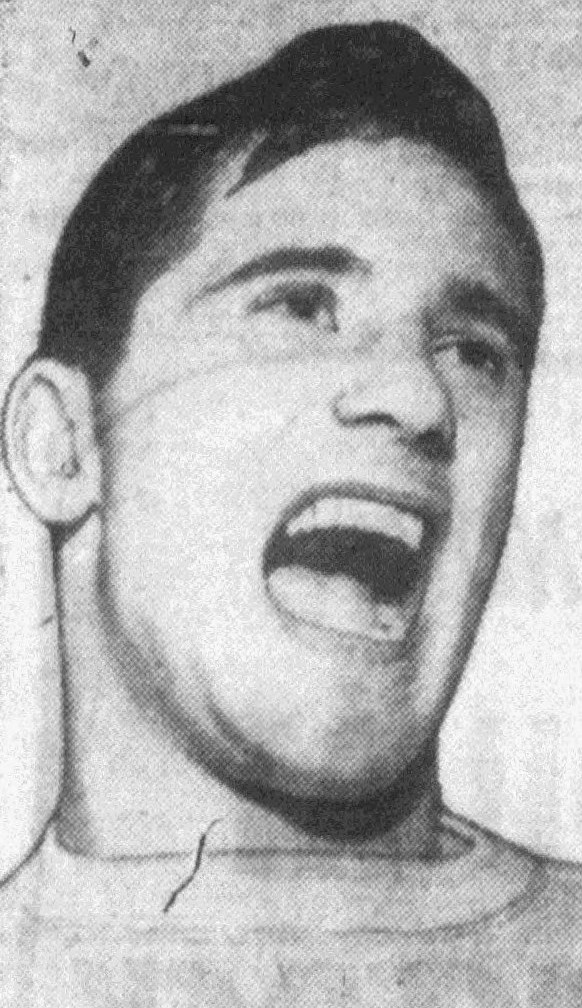
Johnny Lujack

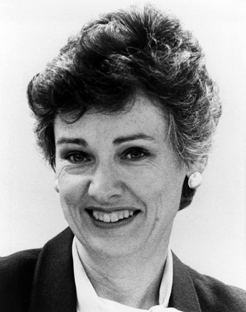
Patricia A. Goldman

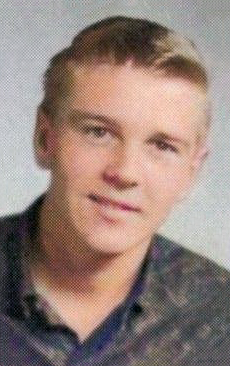
Randy Meisner

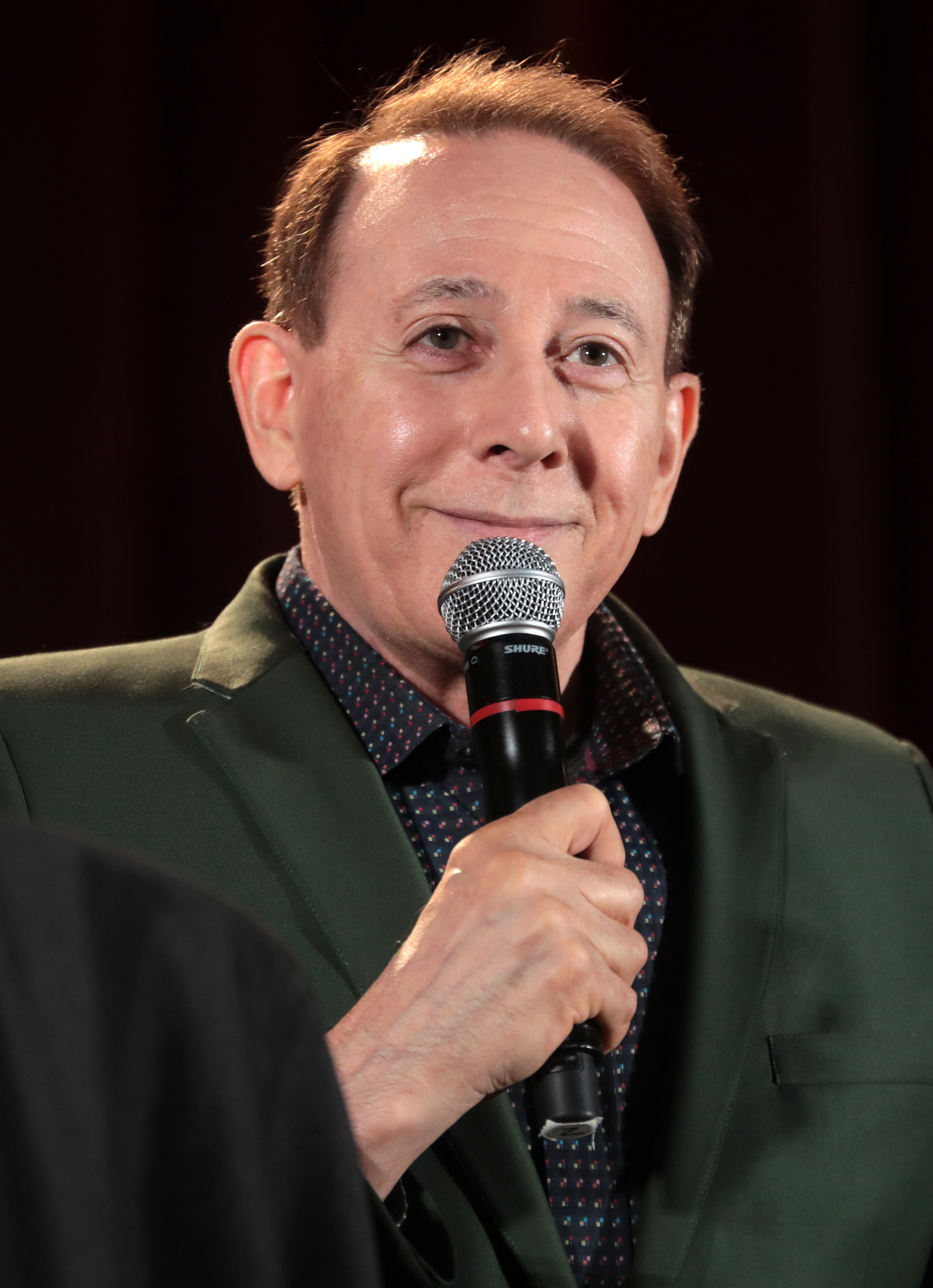
Paul Reubens

- July 1
  - Frank Field, 100, television meteorologist (WNBC) (b. 1923)
  - Robert Lieberman, 75, film and television director (All I Want for Christmas, Fire in the Sky, D3: The Mighty Ducks) (b. 1947)
  - Christopher H. Sterling, 80, media historian (b. 1943)
  - Lawrence Turman, 96, film producer (The Graduate, The Thing, The River Wild) (b. 1926)
- July 2
  - Joseph John Gerry, 94, Roman Catholic prelate, bishop of Portland (1989–2004) and auxiliary bishop of Manchester (1986–1989) (b. 1928)
  - Susan Love, 75, surgeon (b. 1948)
  - Minnie Bruce Pratt, 76, writer and activist (b. 1946)
  - James A. Sharp Jr., 90, politician, mayor of Flint, Michigan (1983–1987) (b. 1933)
- July 3
  - Vicki Anderson, 83, soul singer (b. 1939)
  - Catherine Burks-Brooks, 83, civil rights activist (b. 1939)
  - James Dobbins, 81, diplomat, ambassador to the European Union (1991–1993) and Afghanistan (2001–2002) (b, 1942)
  - Antwun Echols, 52, middleweight boxer (b. 1971)
  - Cecil Exum, 60, basketball player (North Melbourne Giants, Melbourne Tigers, Geelong Supercats) (b. 1962)
  - Lincoln Mayorga, 86, pianist and arranger (b. 1937)
  - Don Reinhoudt, 78, weightlifter (b. 1945)
  - Vince Tobin, 79, football coach (Arizona Cardinals) (b. 1943)
- July 4
  - George Aghajanian, 91, psychiatrist (b. 1932)
  - John Berylson, 70, businessman and association football chairman (Millwall) (b. 1953)
  - Kristaps Keggi, 88, Latvian-born orthopedic surgeon (b. 1934)
  - Fred Willis, 75, football player (Cincinnati Bengals, Houston Oilers) (b. 1947)
- July 5
  - Marvin S. Arrington Sr., 82, politician and jurist, president of the Atlanta City Council (1980–1997) and Fulton County superior court judge (2002–2012) (b. 1941)
  - Coco Lee, 48, Hong Kong-born singer-songwriter (Singer) (b. 1975)
  - Jack Rains, 85, attorney, secretary of state of Texas (1987–1989) (b. 1937)
  - George Tickner, 76, rock guitarist (Journey, Frumious Bandersnatch) (b. 1946) (death announced on this date)
- July 6
  - Jeffrey Carlson, 48, actor (All My Children, The Goat, or Who Is Sylvia?, Hitch) (b. 1975)
  - Johnie Cooks, 64, football player (Baltimore / Indianapolis Colts, New York Giants, Cleveland Browns) (b. 1958)
  - Francis R. Dillon, 83, Air Force general, commander of the OSI (1988–1993) (b. 1939)
  - Gene Gaines, 85, football player (Ottawa Rough Riders, Montreal Alouettes) and coach (Winnipeg Blue Bombers) (b. 1938)
  - George W. Jackson, 98, politician, member of the Pennsylvania House of Representatives (1981–1990) (b. 1924)
  - Peter Nero, 89, pianist and conductor (Philly Pops), Grammy winner (1962, 1963) (b. 1934)
  - Joop Sanders, 101, Dutch-born painter and educator (b. 1921)
  - Mutulu Shakur, 72, convicted robber and murderer (1981 Brink's robbery) (b. 1950)
  - Dick Sheridan, 81, football coach (Furman Paladins, NC State Wolfpack) (b. 1941)
  - Stephen M. Silverman, 71, journalist (New York Post, Time Inc.) (b. 1951)
  - Caleb Southern, 53, musician and computer scientist (b. 1969)
  - Marlena Spieler, 74, food writer (Bon Appétit, Saveur, San Francisco Chronicle) (b. 1949)
  - Jimmy Weldon, 99, voice actor (The Yogi Bear Show, Challenge of the Superfriends, Shirt Tales), ventriloquist and television host (b. 1923)
- July 7
  - Oscar Brashear, 78, jazz trumpeter (b. 1944)
  - Mary Ann Hoberman, 92, author and poet (b. 1930)
  - Nikki McCray, 51, Hall of Fame basketball player (Washington Mystics, Indiana Fever) and coach (Old Dominion Lady Monarchs, Mississippi State Bulldogs) (b. 1971)
- July 8
  - Gary Allen, 63, football player (Houston Oilers, Dallas Cowboys, Calgary Stampeders) (b. 1960)
  - Bryan Collins, 58, football coach (LIU Sharks) (b. 1965)
  - Greg Cook, 72, singer (The Unifics) (b. 1951)
  - Tara Heiss, 66, Hall of Fame basketball player (Maryland Terrapins) (b. 1956)
  - Judith Liebman, 86, operations researcher and engineer (b. 1936)
  - Renault Robinson, 80, police officer (b. 1942)
  - Bill Shipp, 89, author and journalist (The Atlanta Constitution) (b. 1933)
  - Evelyn M. Witkin, 102, geneticist (b. 1921)
  - Melvin Wulf, 95, lawyer (b. 1927)
  - Juris Zarins, 78, German-born archaeologist (b. 1945)
- July 9
  - Joe Campbell, 68, football player (New Orleans Saints, Oakland Raiders, Tampa Bay Buccaneers) (b. 1955)
  - Manny Coto, 62, Cuban-born television writer, director and producer (Star Trek: Enterprise, 24, Dexter) (b. 1961)
  - Charlie Daniels, 83, politician, Arkansas commissioner of state lands (1985–2003), secretary of state (2003–2011), and state auditor (2011–2015) (b, 1939)
  - Andrea Evans, 66, actress (One Life to Live, The Young and the Restless, Passions) (b. 1957)
  - Kenton Forsythe, 78, audio engineer and inventor (b. 1944)
  - Lee Hedges, 93, high school football coach (Captain Shreve High School) (b. 1929)
  - Roy Herron, 69, politician, member of the Tennessee House of Representatives (1987–1997) and Senate (1997–2013) (b. 1953)
  - Mikala Jones, 44, surfer (b. 1979)
  - Henry Kamm, 98, German-born journalist (The New York Times), Pulitzer Prize winner (1978) (b. 1925)
  - Benno C. Schmidt Jr., 81, law scholar, president of Yale University (1986–1992) (b. 1942)
  - Leroy W. Stutz, 84, Air Force officer, pilot, and prisoner of war (b. 1939)
- July 10
  - Randy Fullmer, 73, animator (Who Framed Roger Rabbit) and producer (The Emperor's New Groove, Chicken Little) (b. 1950)
  - Al Giordano, 63, journalist (Narco News) and political commentator (b. 1959)
  - Richard G. Hovannisian, 90, historian and professor (b. 1932)
  - Sally Kempton, 80, spiritual writer (b. 1943)
  - Manny the Frenchie, 12, French Bulldog (b. 2011) (death announced on this date)
  - Bob Segarini, 77, American-Canadian musician and radio presenter (b. 1945)
  - JoAnn Watson, 72, pastor and politician, member of the Detroit City Council (2003–2013) (b. 1951)
- July 11
  - Gaea Pelefoti Failautusi, 83, American Samoan politician, senator (1995–1999) (b. 1939) (death announced on this date)
  - Dakota Fred Hurt, 80, television personality (Gold Rush: White Water) (b, 1943)
  - Mantaur, 55, professional wrestler (WWF) (b. 1968)
  - C. R. Roberts, 87, football player (Toronto Argonauts, San Francisco 49ers) (b. 1936)
- July 12
  - André Watts, 77, pianist and academic, Grammy Award winner (1964), Avery Fisher Prize recipient (1988) (b. 1946)
  - An Yin, 64, Chinese-born geologist (b. 1959)
- July 13
  - Ed Bressoud, 91, baseball player (New York / San Francisco Giants, Boston Red Sox, St. Louis Cardinals) (b. 1932)
  - Josephine Chaplin, 74, actress (The Canterbury Tales, Escape to the Sun, Nuits Rouges) (b. 1949)
  - Mike Endsley, 61, politician, member of the Wisconsin State Assembly (2011–2015) (b. 1962)
  - Carlin Glynn, 83, actress (The Best Little Whorehouse in Texas, Three Days of the Condor, The Trip to Bountiful) (b. 1940)
  - Edward Hume, 87, television and film writer (The Day After, Barnaby Jones, The Streets of San Francisco) (b. 1936)
  - Justin Peacock, 52, television writer and producer (Suits, The Lincoln Lawyer, Alert: Missing Persons Unit) (b. 1971)
  - Bill Reynolds, 78, sports journalist (The Providence Journal) (b. 1945)
- July 14
  - Bernard Bachrach, 84, historian (b. 1939)
  - Nick Benedict, 77, actor (All My Children, The Young and the Restless, Days of Our Lives) (b. 1946)
  - Dianne Chambless, 75, clinical psychologist (b. 1948)
  - Anthony Meo, drummer (Biohazard) (death announced on this date)
  - Nancy Pyle, 85, politician (b. 1938)
  - Hettie Simmons Love, 100, minority female college student, first African-American to earn an MBA from an Ivy League university (b. 1922)
  - Beverly Moss Spatt, 99, public official and preservationist, chair of the New York City Landmarks Preservation Commission (1970–1974) (b. 1924)
- July 15
  - Darrel Aschbacher, 88, football player (San Francisco 49ers, Philadelphia Eagles, Saskatchewan Roughriders) (b. 1935)
  - Julius Crosslin, 39, football player (Dallas Cowboys) (b. 1983)
  - Dave Currey, 80, football coach (Long Beach State 49ers, Cincinnati Bearcats) (b. 1943)
  - John R. Manz, 77, Roman Catholic prelate, auxiliary bishop of Chicago (1996–2021) (b. 1945)
  - William O'Malley, 91, Roman Catholic priest and actor (The Exorcist) (b. 1931)
  - James Zagel, 82, judge of the United States District Court for the Northern District of Illinois and novelist (b. 1941)
- July 16
  - Elise Finch, 51, meteorologist (b. 1972)
  - Harry Frankfurt, 94, philosopher (b. 1929)
  - Funny Cide, 23, Thoroughbred racehorse (b. 2000)
  - SunRay Kelley, 71, builder (b. 1951)
  - Neil Maune, 62, football player (Notre Dame Fighting Irish) (b. 1961)
  - Richard Henry Mills, 93, jurist, judge of the U.S. District Court for Central Illinois (since 1985) (b. 1929)
  - Kevin Mitnick, 59, computer security consultant, author and convicted hacker (b. 1953)
  - Angelo Mozilo, 84, banker and financial CEO (Countrywide Financial) (b. 1938)
- July 17
  - Jerry Bradley, 83, music executive (Wanted! The Outlaws) (b. 1940)
  - DJ Deeon, 56, dance music DJ and producer (b. 1966)
  - Stuart Epperson, 86, evangelical and businessman, co-founder of Salem Media Group (b. 1936)
  - Walt Groller, 92, polka musician (b. 1931)
  - Sue Marx, 92, documentary film director and producer (Young at Heart), Oscar winner (1987) (b. 1930)
- July 18
  - Miller Farr, 80, football player (Houston Oilers, St. Louis Cardinals, San Diego Chargers) (b. 1943)
  - Richard W. Goldberg, 95, jurist, judge of the United States Court of International Trade (since 1991) (b. 1927)
  - Lew Perkins, 78, athletic director (Wichita State Shockers, UConn Huskies, Kansas Jayhawks) (b. 1945)
  - Martha Saxton, 77, historian (b. 1945)
  - Stu Silver, 76, screenwriter (Throw Momma from the Train) and television writer (Soap, Webster) (b. 1947)
  - Larry Yellen, 80, baseball player (Houston Colt .45s) (b. 1943)
- July 19
  - Frank Cody, 75, record producer, A&R and radio executive (KTWV) (b. 1948)
  - Alex Etheridge, 13, child (b. 2009/2010)
  - James Reston Jr., 82, journalist (b. 1941)
  - Eleanor Vadala, 99, chemist and materials engineer (b. 1923)
  - Dedric Willoughby, 49, basketball player (Chicago Bulls) (b. 1974)
  - Jean Fagan Yellin, 92, historian and author (b. 1930)
- July 20
  - Bill Geddie, 68, television producer (The View) (b. 1955)
  - Myron Goldfinger, 90, architect (b. 1933)
  - Patricia T. Holland, 81, Latter-day Saints writer and leader (b. 1942)
- July 21
  - Tony Bennett, 96, jazz and traditional pop singer ("I Left My Heart in San Francisco", "Rags to Riches", "Because of You") (b. 1926)
  - Jerome Coopersmith, 97, dramatist (Hawaii Five-O, Baker Street, The Apple Tree) (b. 1925)
  - Mike Ivie, 70, baseball player (Detroit Tigers, San Francisco Giants, San Diego Padres, Houston Astros) (b. 1952)
  - Neal Langford, 50, bass guitarist (The Shins) (b. 1973)
- July 22
  - Aaron Cicourel, 94, sociologist (b. 1928)
  - Miles Feinstein, 82, attorney (b. 1941)
  - Lelia Goldoni, 86, actress (Shadows, Hysteria, Alice Doesn't Live Here Anymore) (b. 1936)
  - Russell H. Greenan, 97, author (It Happened in Boston?) (b. 1925)
  - Larry Ray, 65, former MLB baseball player (Houston Astros) (b. 1958)
  - Arthur Rubin, 97, singer and actor (The Patty Duke Show, The Producers) (b. 1926)
  - Roger Sprung, 92, folk musician (b. 1930)
- July 23
  - Earl I. Anzai, 81, politician, attorney general of Hawaii (1999–2002) (b. 1941)
  - Pamela Blair, 73, actress (A Chorus Line, Loving, All My Children) (b. 1949)
  - Brent Budowsky, 71, journalist, political opinion writer and columnist for The Hill (b. 1952)
  - Dorothy Goodman, 97, educator (b. 1926)
  - Leo Richardson, 91, basketball (Savannah State, Buffalo Bulls) and football coach (Savannah State) (b. 1931)
  - Inga Swenson, 90, actress (Soap, Benson, North and South) (b. 1932)
- July 24
  - Brad Houser, 62, musician (Edie Brickell & New Bohemians, Critters Buggin) (b. 1960)
  - Jesse Lott, 80, visual artist (b. 1943) (death announced on this date)
  - Virginia Mahan, 74, American politician, member of the West Virginia House of Delegates (1997–2012) (b. 1949).
  - Charles W. Misner, 91, physicist (Gravitation) (b. 1932)
  - Dan Morrison, 75, baseball umpire (b. 1948)
  - Ronald Numbers, 81, science historian (The Creationists) (b. 1942)
- July 25
  - Julian Barry, 92, screenwriter and playwright (Lenny, Rhinoceros, The River) (b. 1930)
  - Earl Buford, 81, police officer, Pittsburgh police chief (1992–1995) (1941/1942)
  - Bo Goldman, 90, screenwriter (One Flew Over the Cuckoo's Nest, Melvin and Howard, Scent of a Woman), Oscar winner (1975, 1980) (b. 1932)
  - Roy Harrisville, 101, theologian (b. 1922)
  - Johnny Lujack, 98, football player (Chicago Bears), 1947 Heisman Trophy winner (b. 1925)
  - Anthony Potts, 59, major general (b. 1963/1964)
  - Tommy Seigler, 84, professional wrestler (b. 1938)
  - Rocky Wirtz, 70, businessman, owner of the Chicago Blackhawks (since 2007) and president of Wirtz Corporation (since 2007) (b. 1952)
- July 26
  - Jonathan Cuneo, 70, lawyer (b. 1952)
  - Patricia A. Goldman, 81, public official and women's rights advocate (b. 1942)
  - Curtis Graves, 84, politician, member of the Texas House of Representatives (1967–1973) (b. 1938)
  - James Harvey, 35, bassist (Goatwhore) (b. 1987/1988)
  - Henry Logan, 77, basketball player (Oakland Oaks/Washington Caps) (b. 1946)
  - Mark Lowery, 66, politician, treasurer of Arkansas (since 2023) and member of the Arkansas House of Representatives (2013–2023) (b. 1957)
  - Randy Meisner, 77, Hall of Fame musician (Eagles, Poco) and songwriter ("Take It to the Limit"), Grammy winner (1976, 1978) (b. 1946)
  - Alan Schoen, 98, physicist and computer scientist (Gyroid) (b. 1924)
  - Helen Williams, 87, fashion model (b. 1935)
- July 27
  - Beatle Bob, 70, dancer (b. 1953)
  - Mike Giddings, 89, football coach (San Francisco 49ers) (b. 1933)
  - Gary Glenn, 65, politician, member of the Michigan House of Representatives (2015–2018) (b. 1958)
  - Ruth W. Greenfield, 99, concert pianist and teacher (b. 1923)
  - Keith Waldrop, 90, poet (b. 1932)
  - Douglas S. Wright, 75, politician, mayor of Topeka, Kansas (1983–1989) (b. 1948)
- July 28
  - Louis DeLuca, 89, politician, member of the Connecticut State Senate (1991–2007) (b. 1933)
- July 29
  - Marc Gilpin, 56, actor (Jaws 2, The Legend of the Lone Ranger, Earthbound) (b. 1966)
  - Thomas Goltz, 68, writer and journalist (b. 1954)
  - O'Shae Sibley, 28, gay man (b. 1994/1995)
  - Nancy Van de Vate, 92, composer (b. 1930)
  - Ben Wilson, 84, football player (Los Angeles Rams, Green Bay Packers) (b. 1939)
  - George Wilson, 81, basketball player (Cincinnati Royals, Chicago Bulls, Seattle SuperSonics) (b. 1942)
- July 30
  - Betty Ann Bruno, 91, journalist (KTVU) and actress (The Wizard of Oz, The Hurricane) (b. 1931)
  - Paul Reubens, 70, actor (Pee-wee's Big Adventure, Pee-wee's Playhouse, The Nightmare Before Christmas, Blow) (b. 1952)
- July 31
  - Angus Cloud, 25, actor (Euphoria, North Hollywood, The Line), accidental drug overdose (b. 1998)
  - Carol Duvall, 97, television host (The Carol Duvall Show) (b. 1926)
  - Jim Larkin, 74, journalist and publisher (Phoenix New Times) (b. 1949)
  - Roberto Cintli Rodríguez, 69, Mexican-born columnist, author, and academic (Mexican American studies) (b. 1953/1954)

== August ==
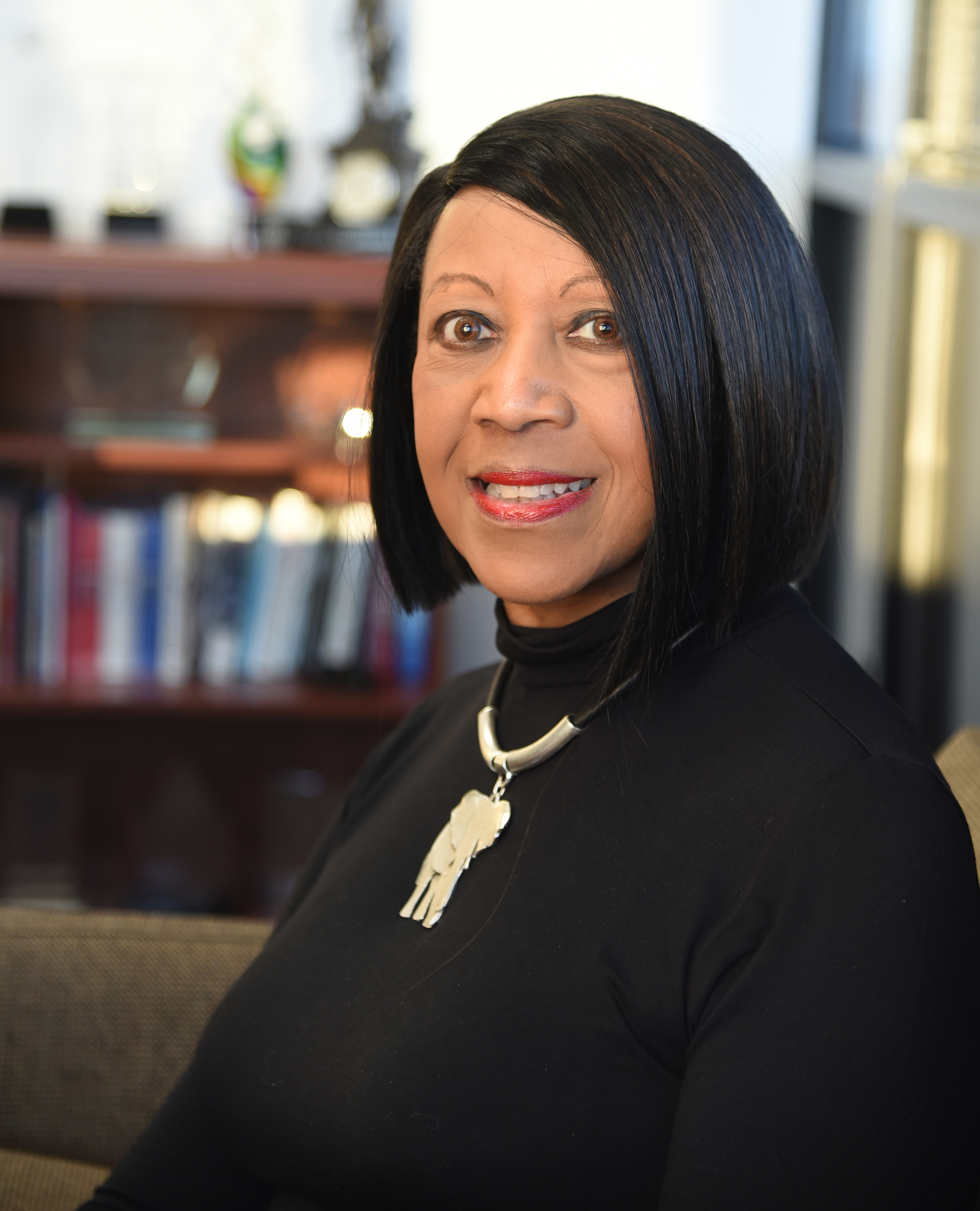
Sheila Oliver

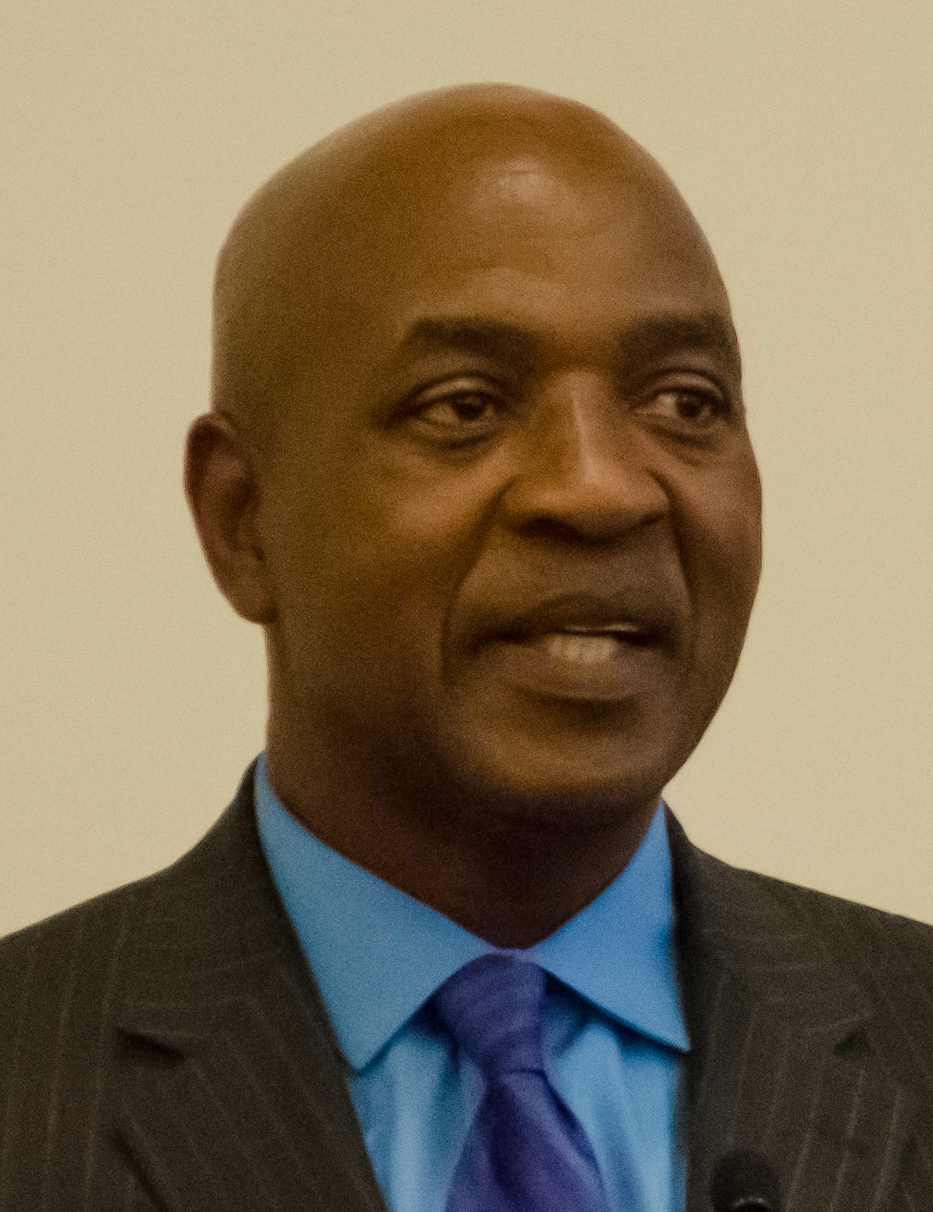
Charles Ogletree

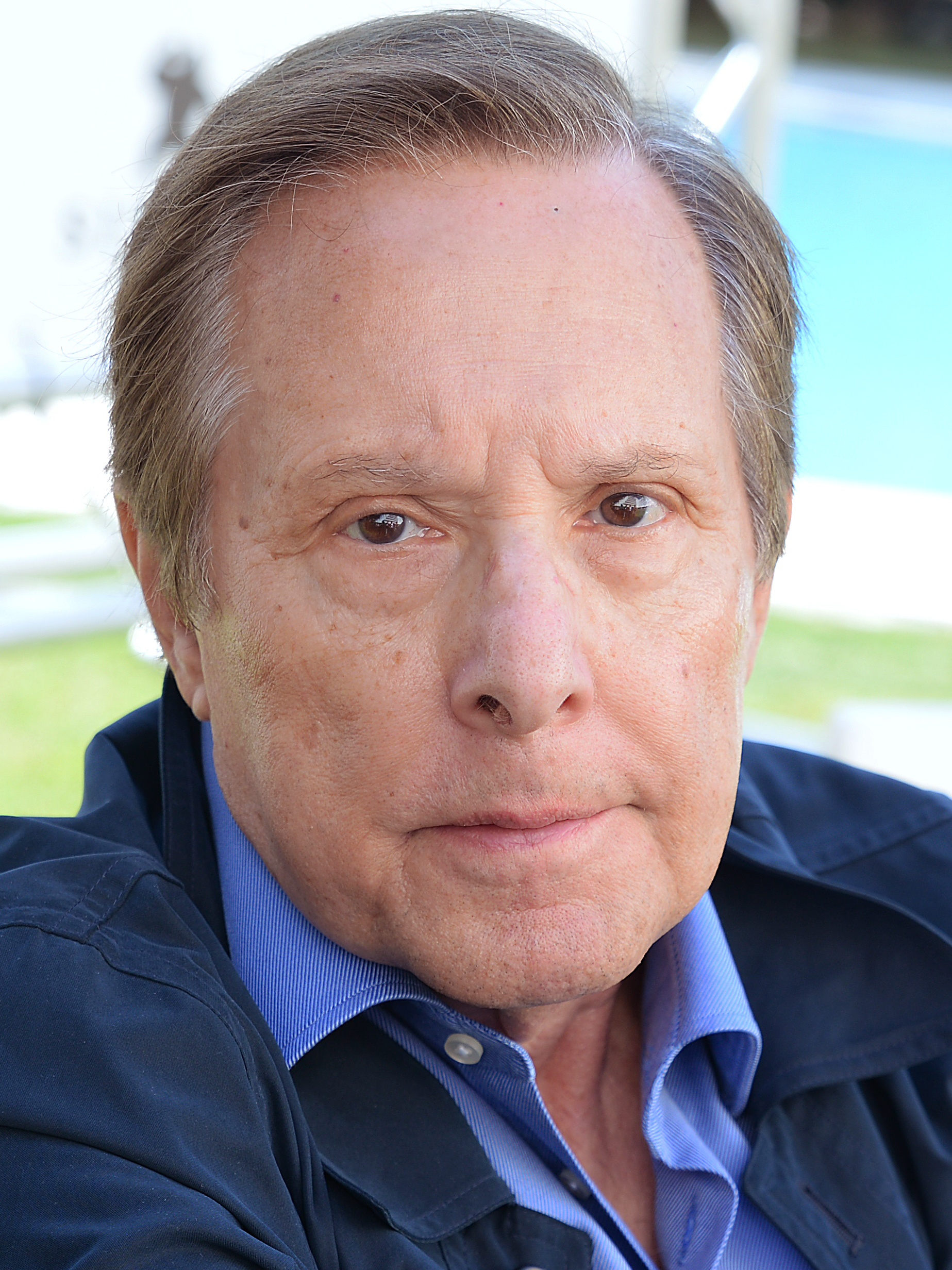
William Friedkin

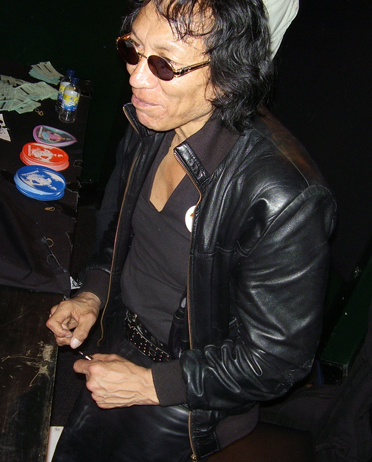
Sixto Rodriguez

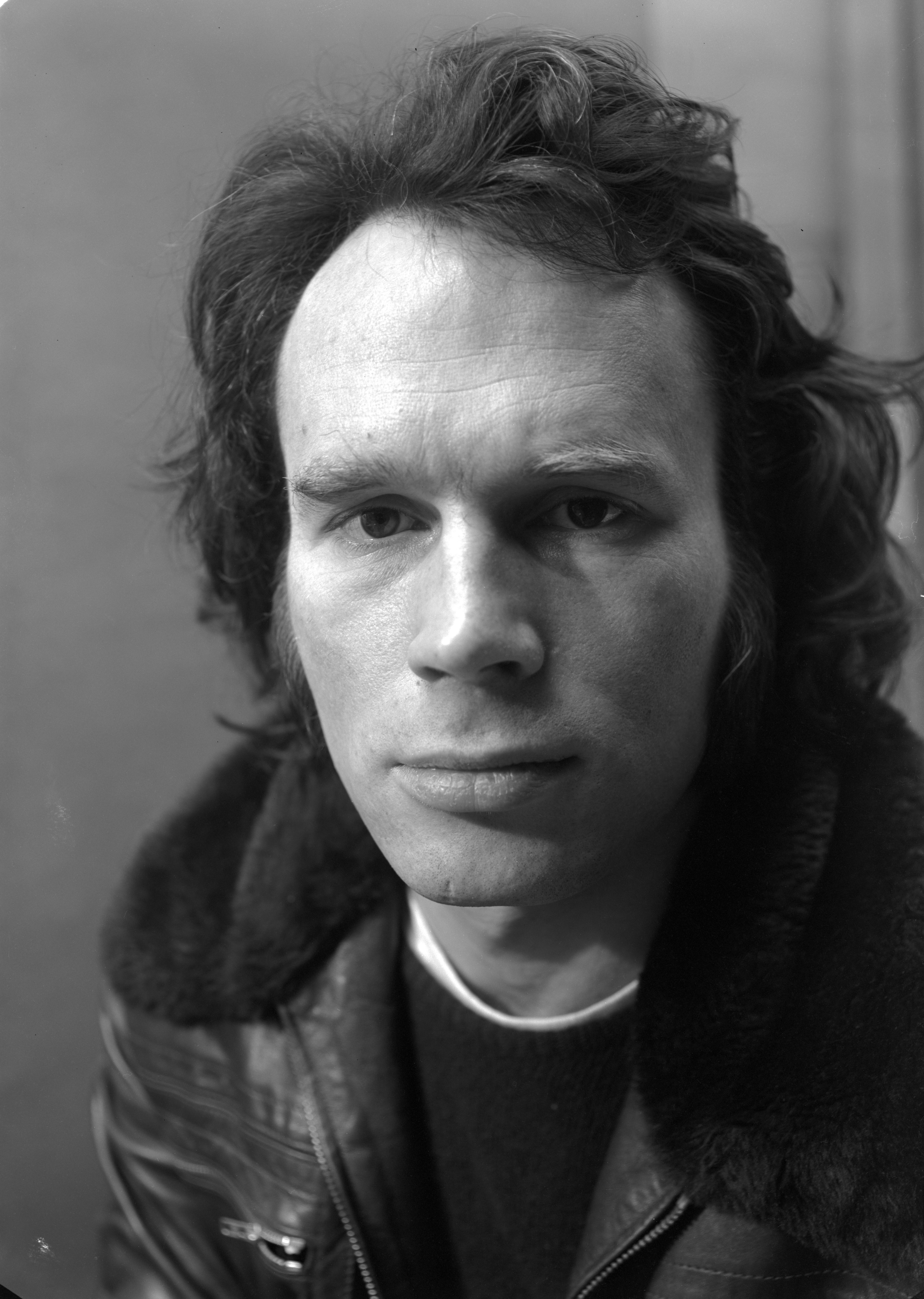
Brice Marden

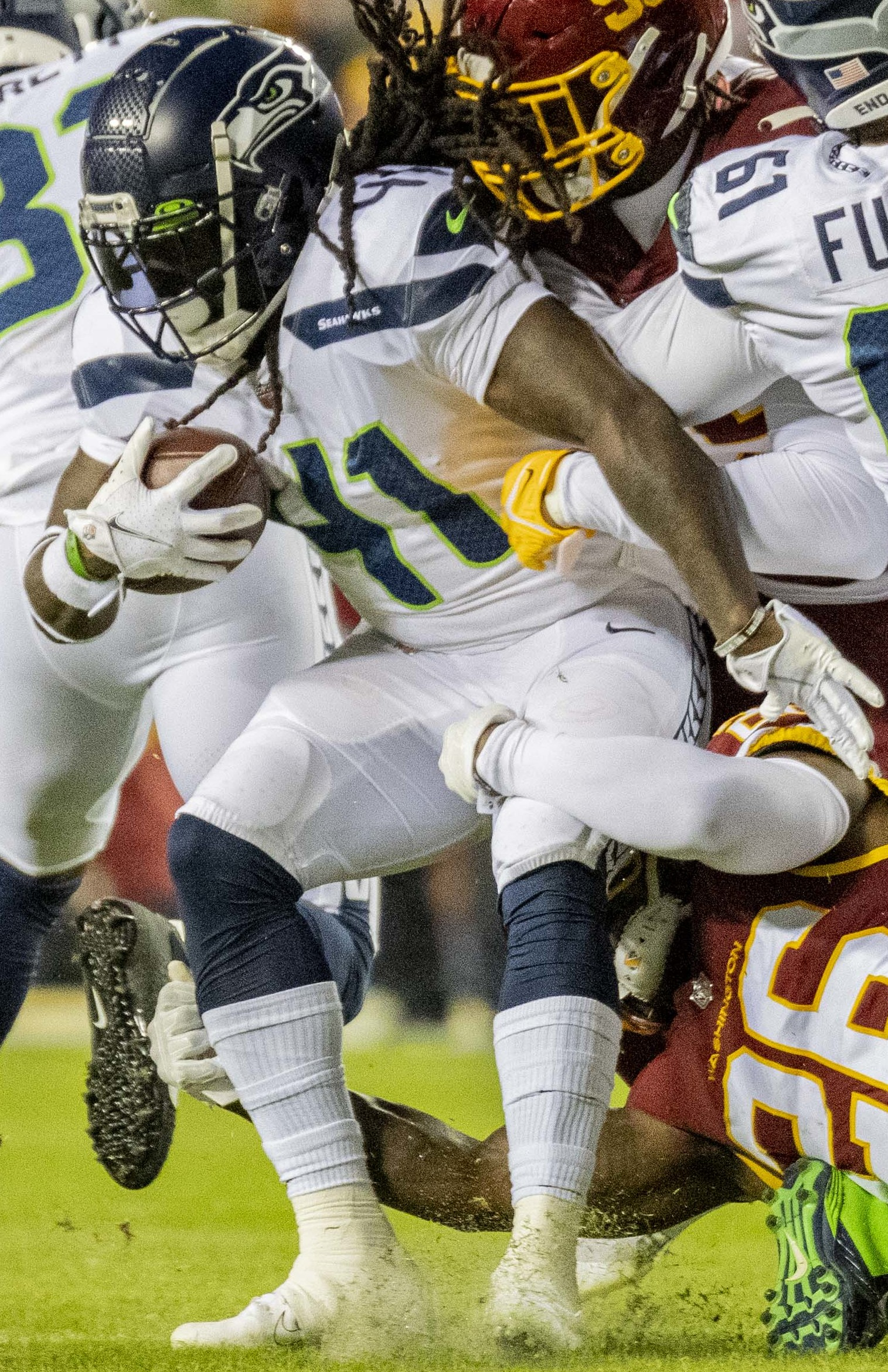
Alex Collins

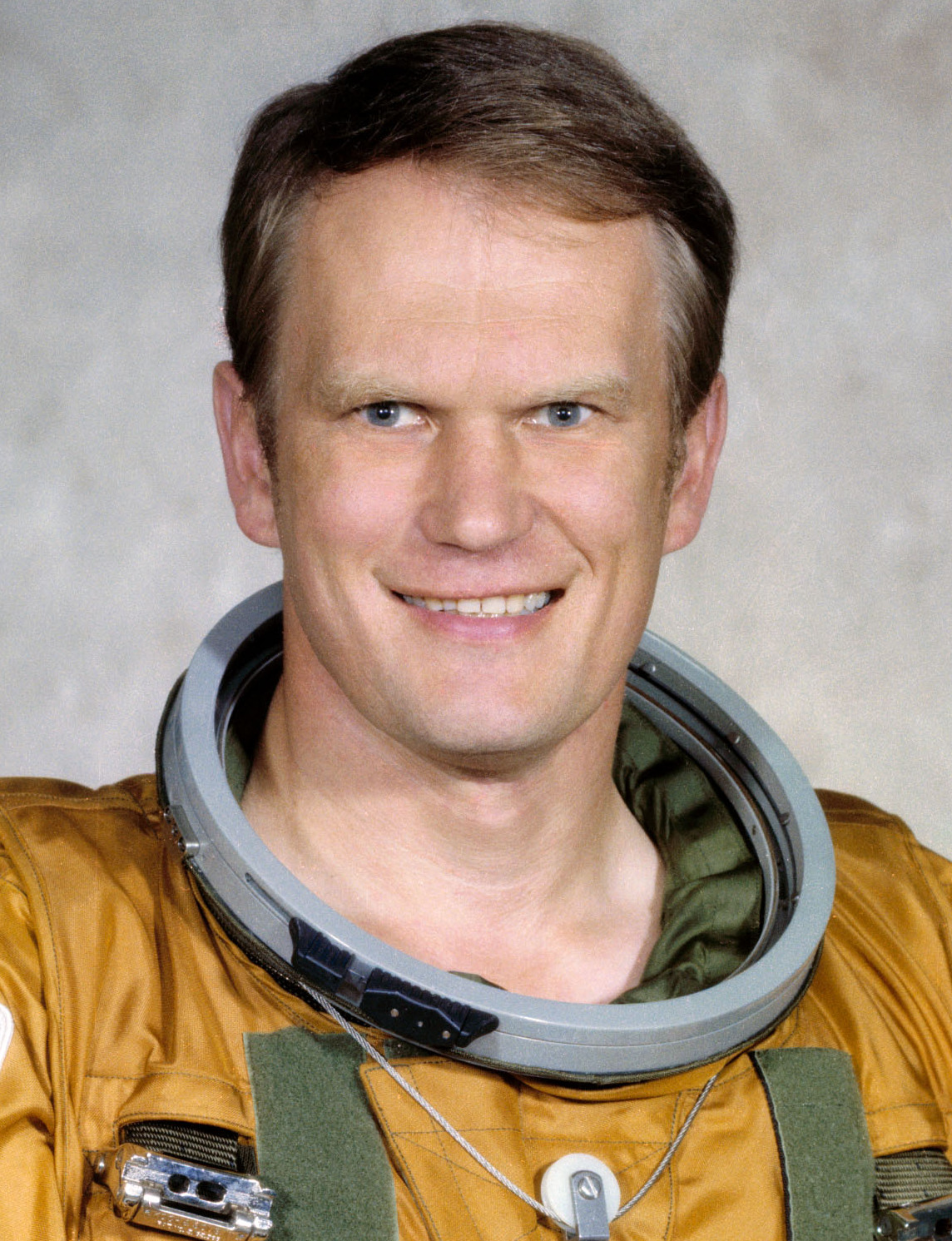
Karol J. Bobko

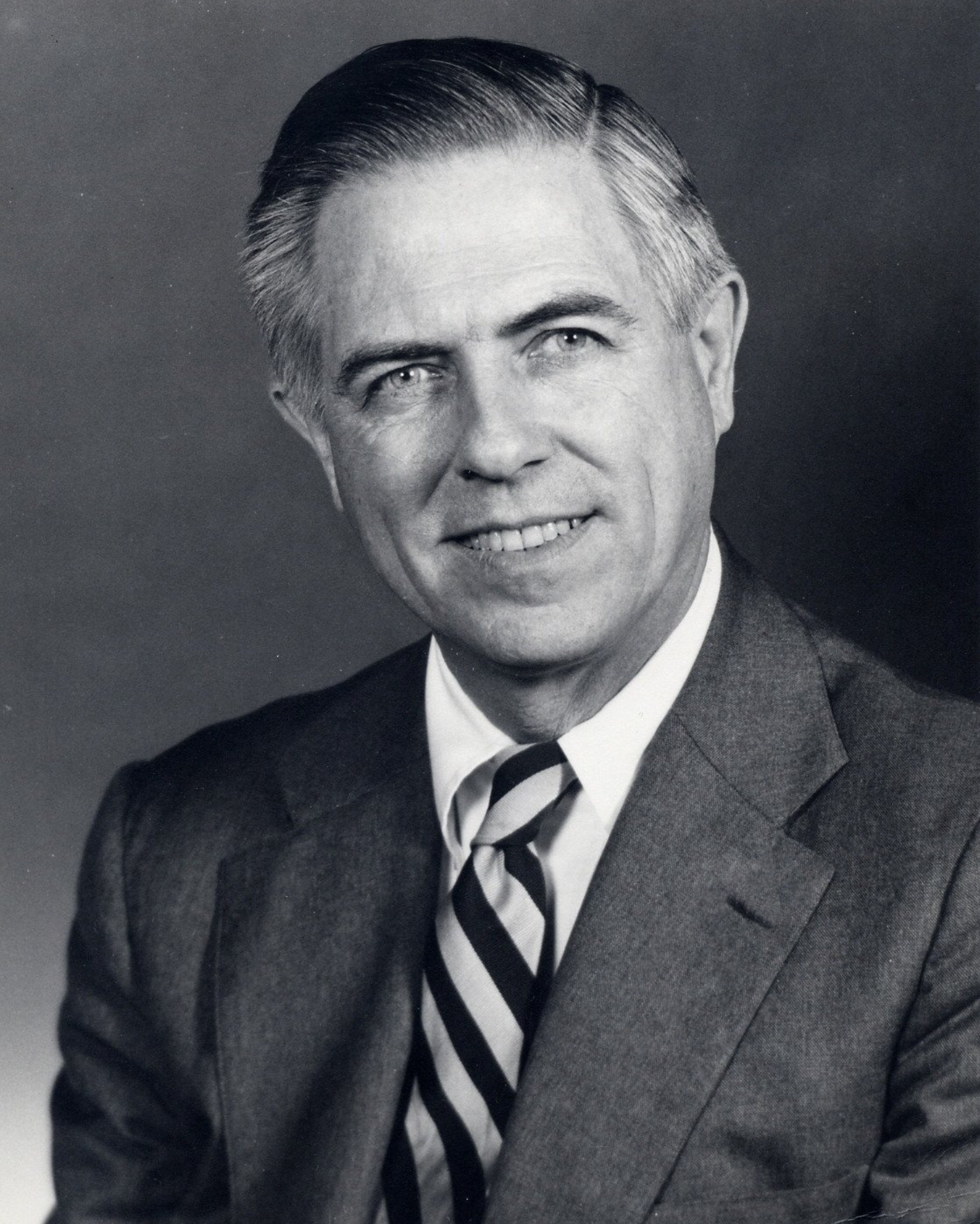
James L. Buckley

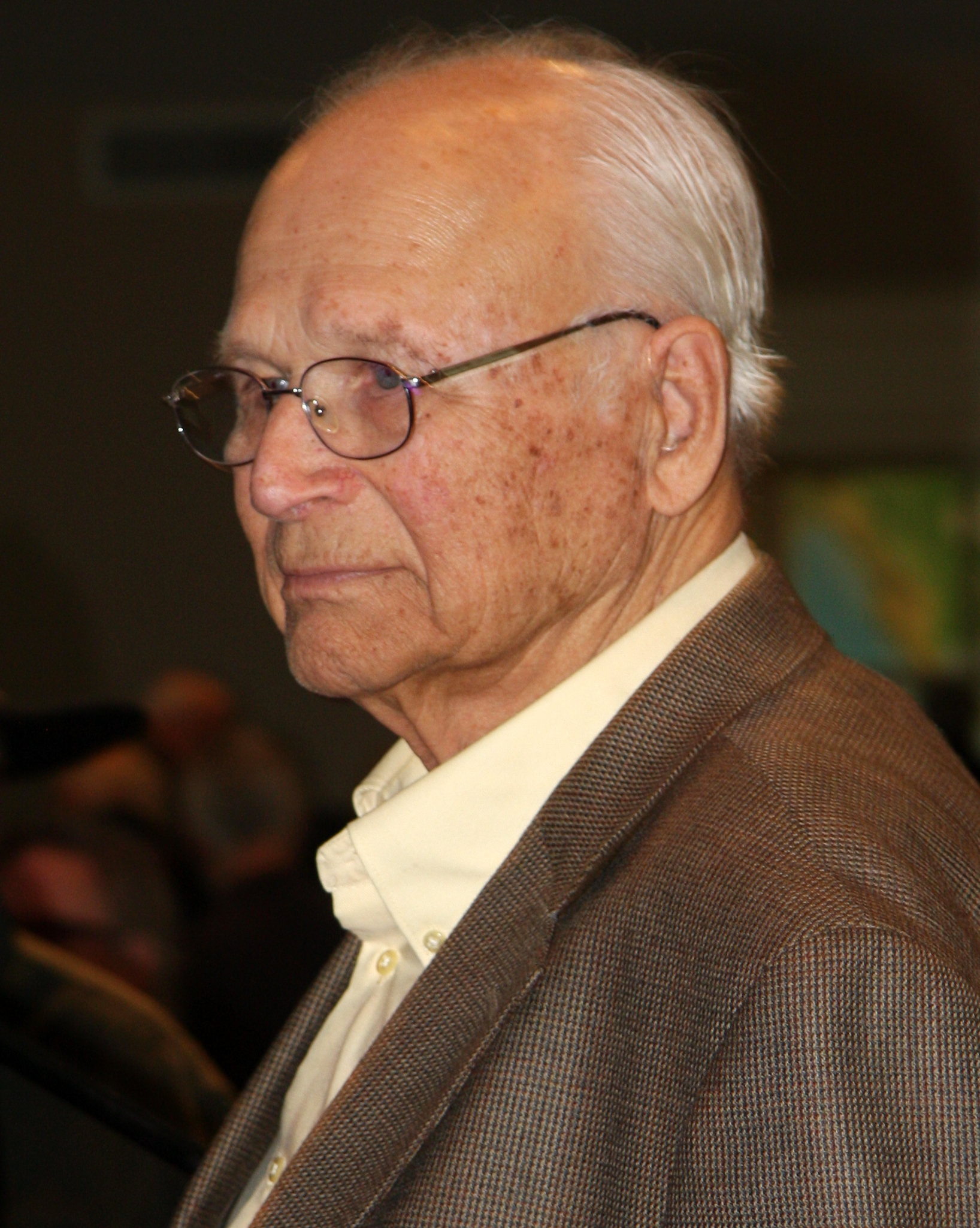
Albert Quie

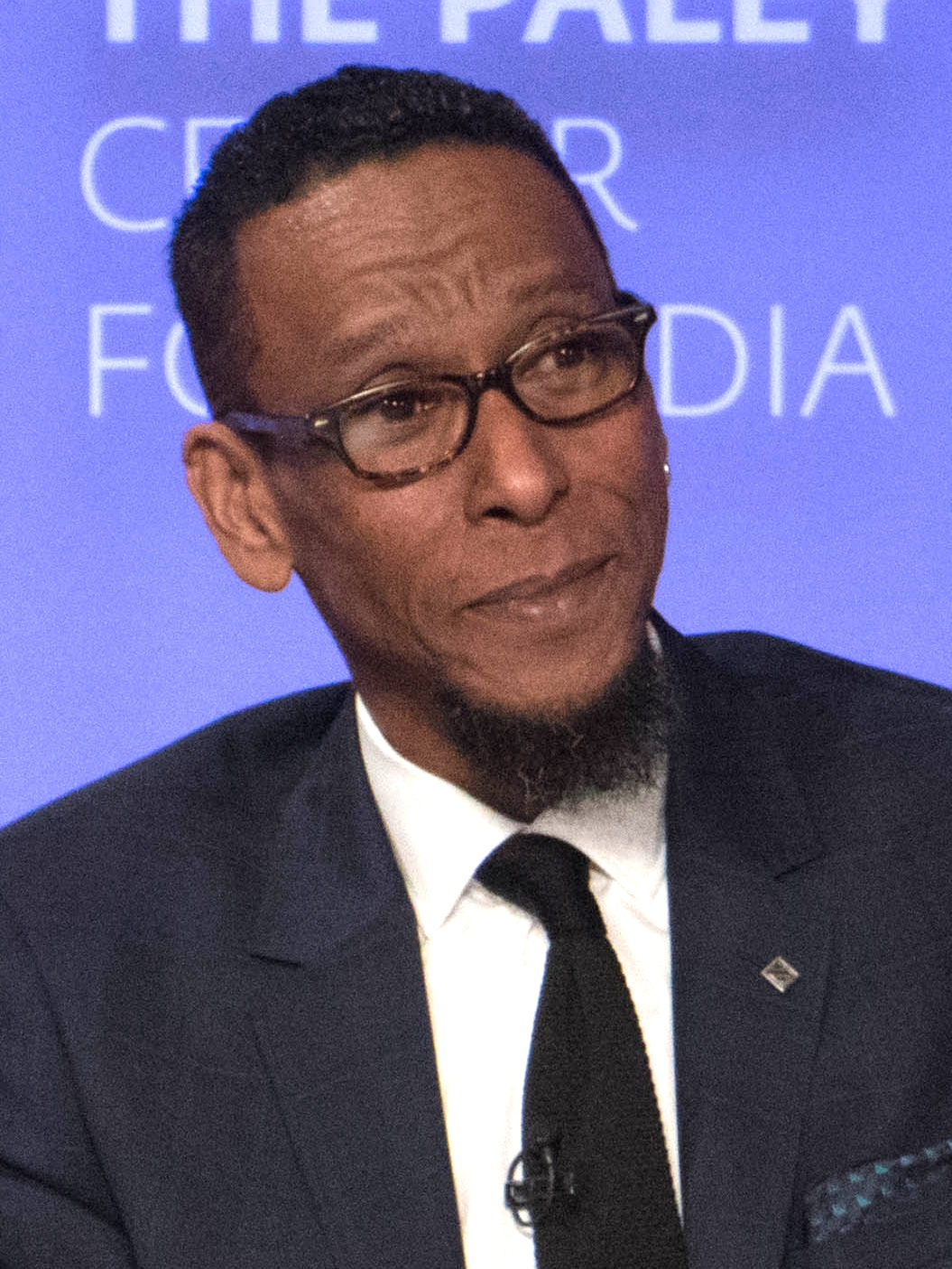
Ron Cephas Jones

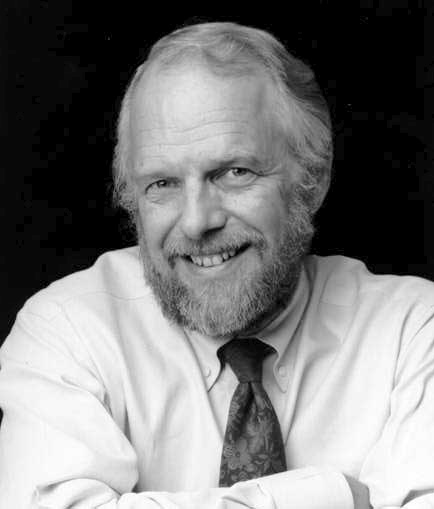
John Warnock

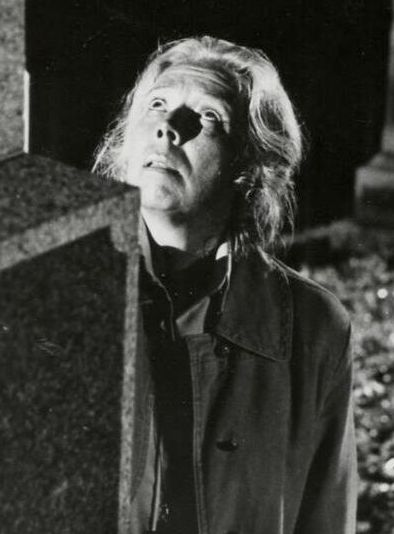
Elizabeth Hoffman

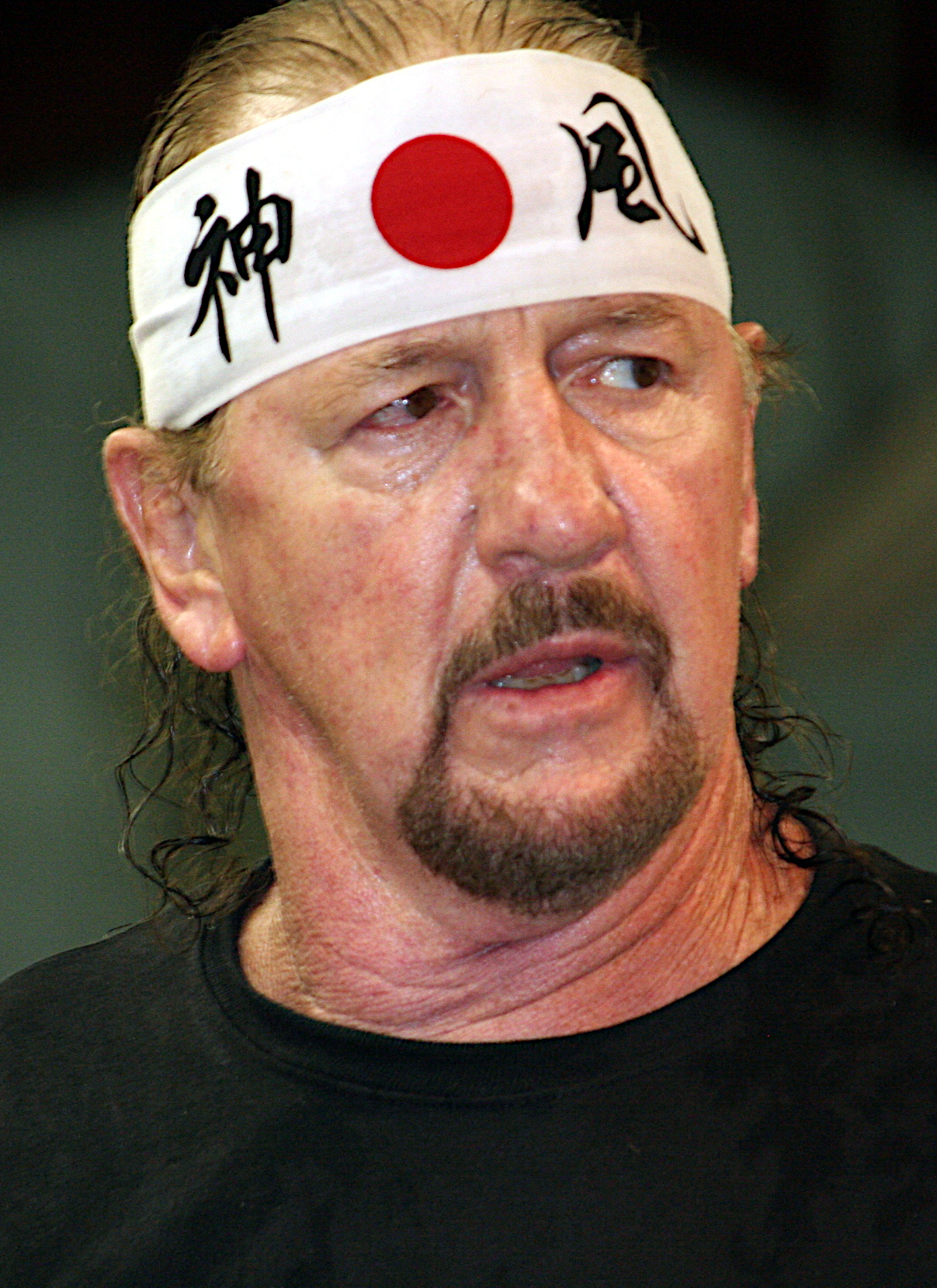
Terry Funk

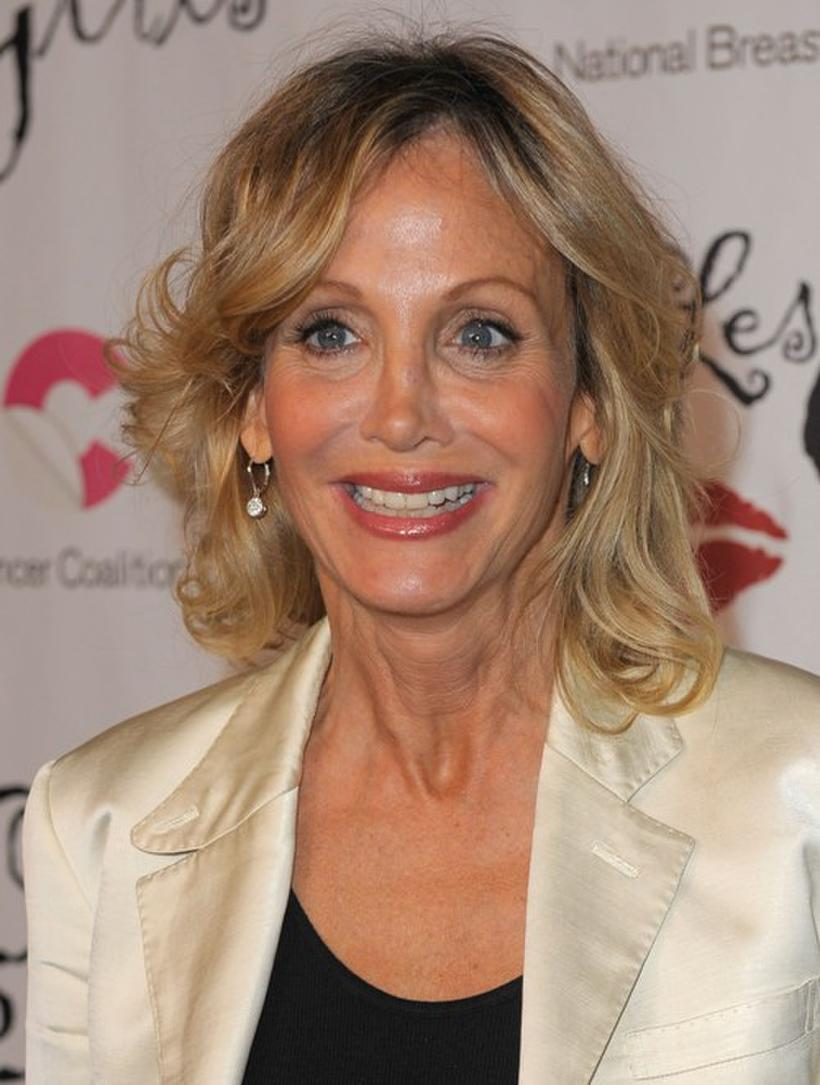
Arleen Sorkin

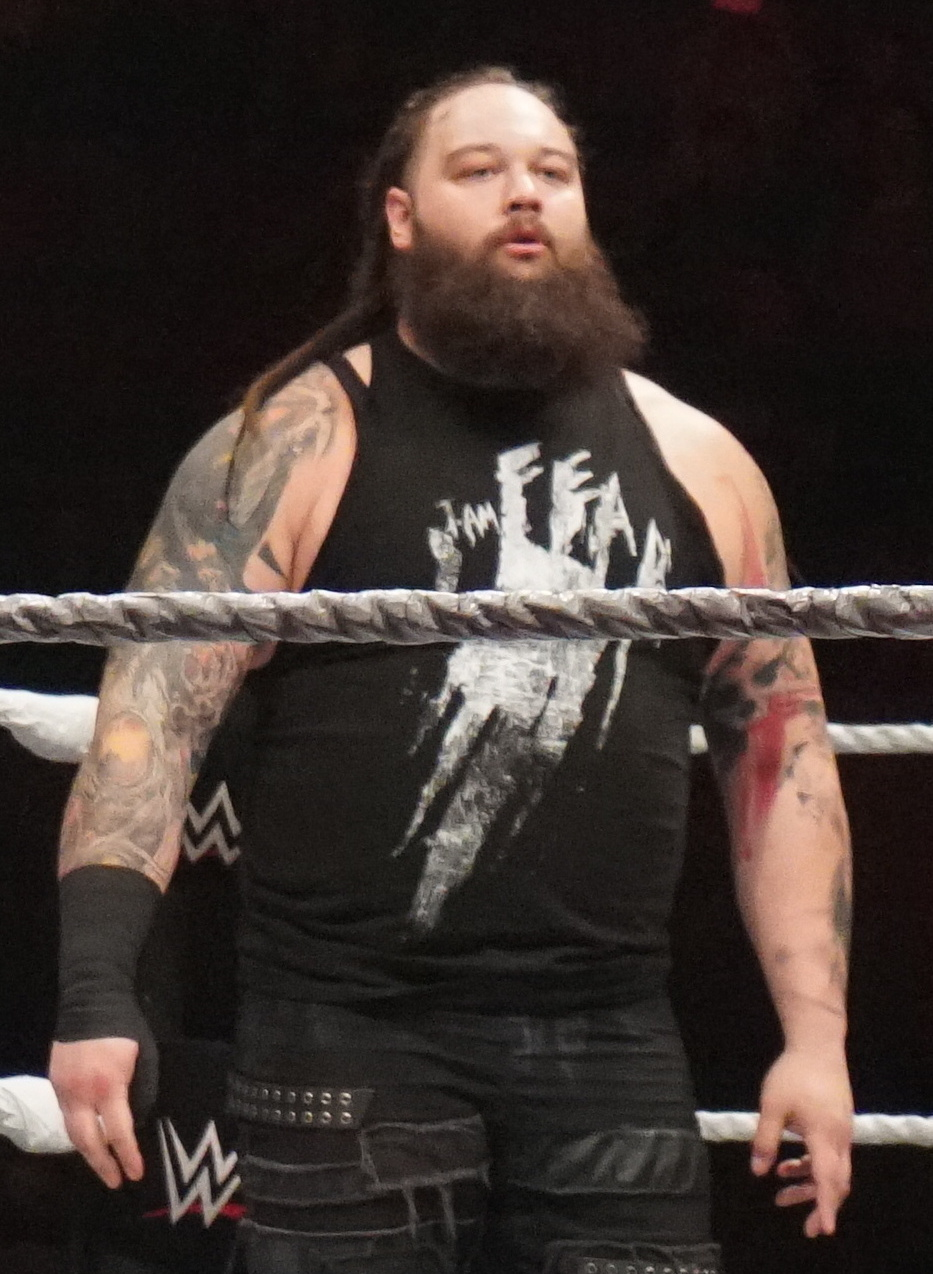
Bray Wyatt

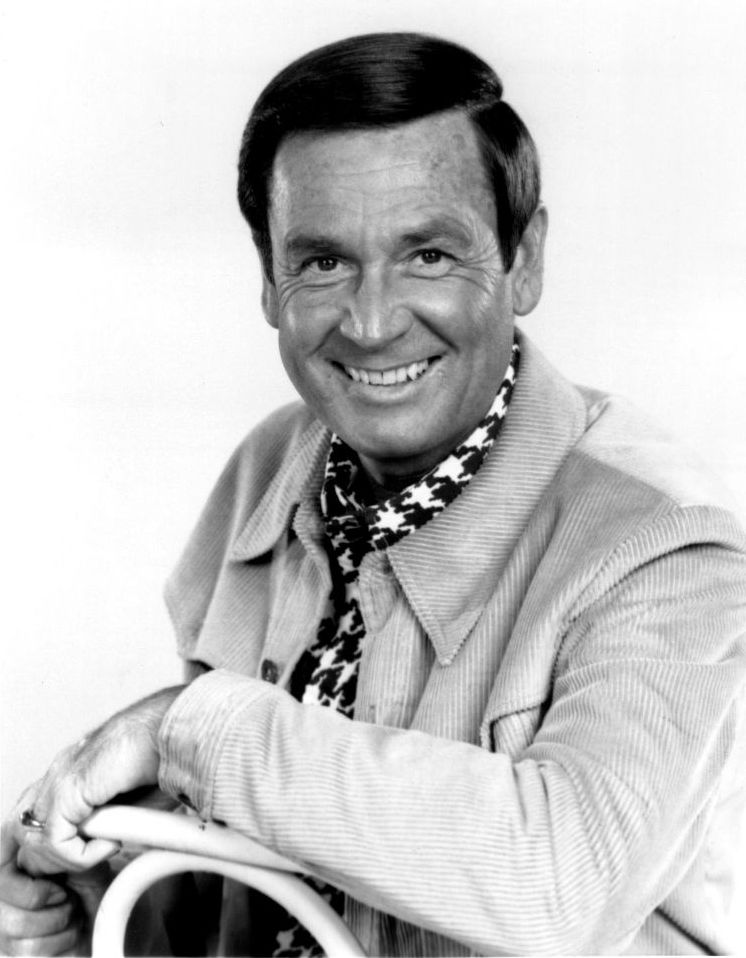
Bob Barker

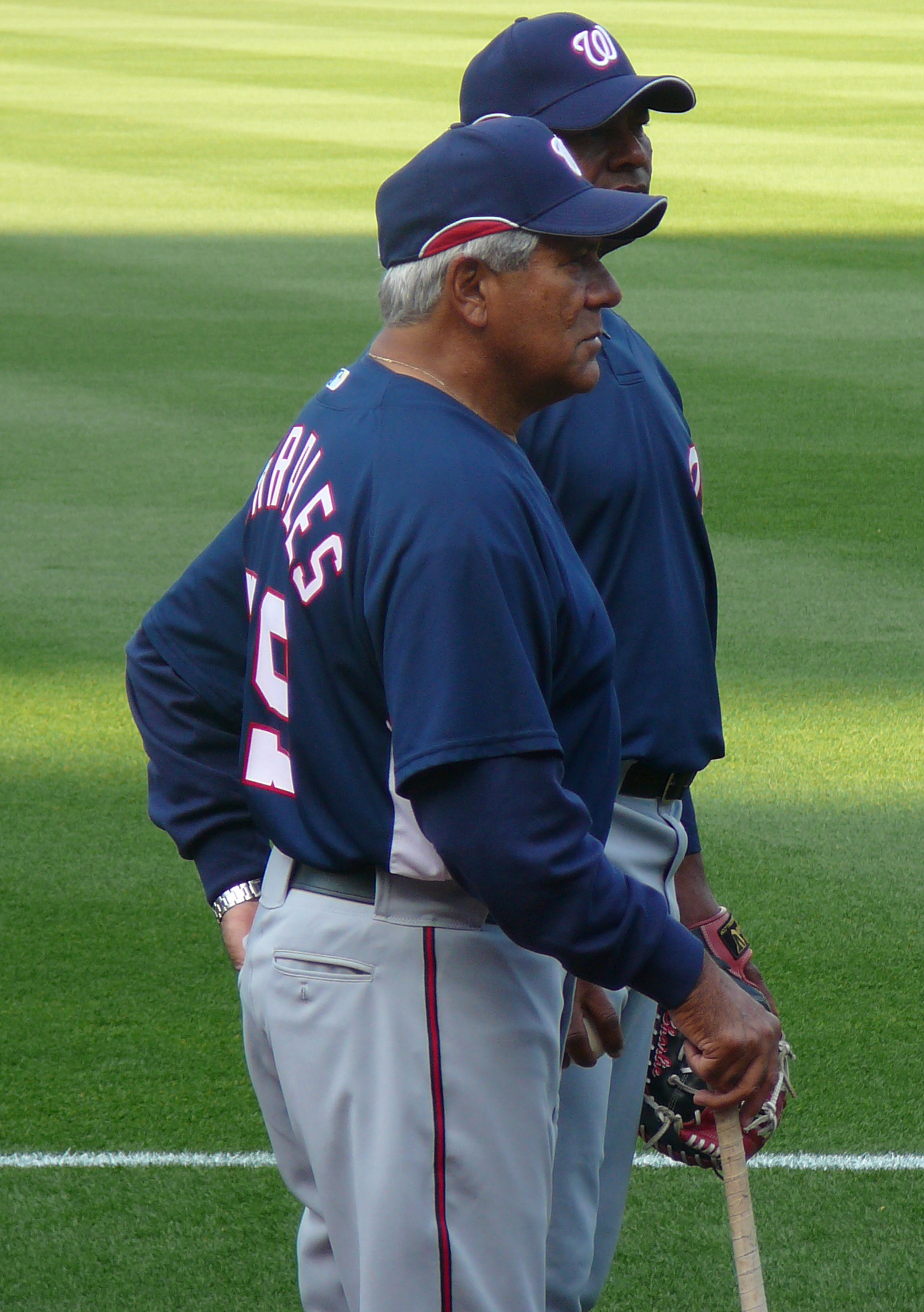
Pat Corrales

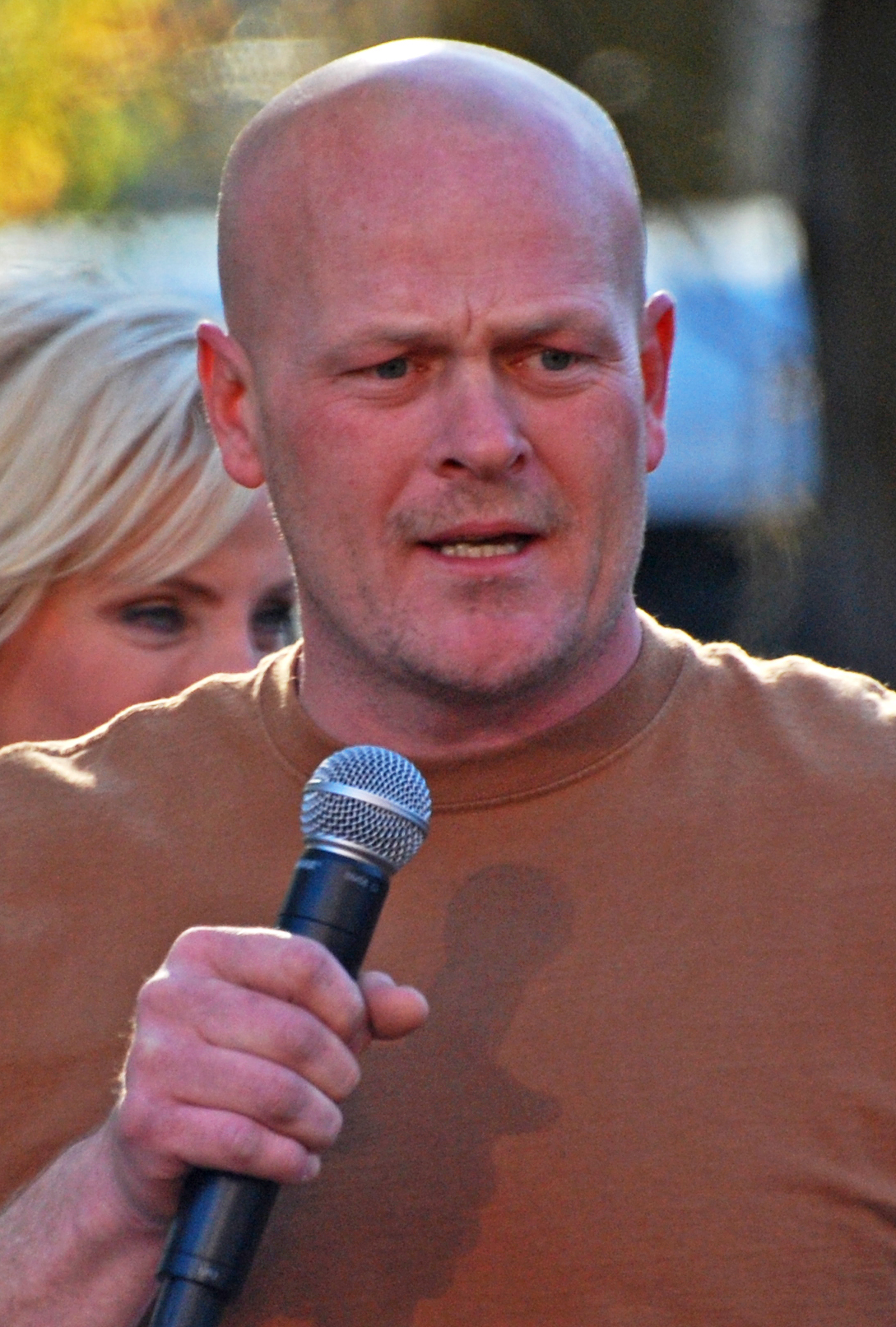
Joe the Plumber

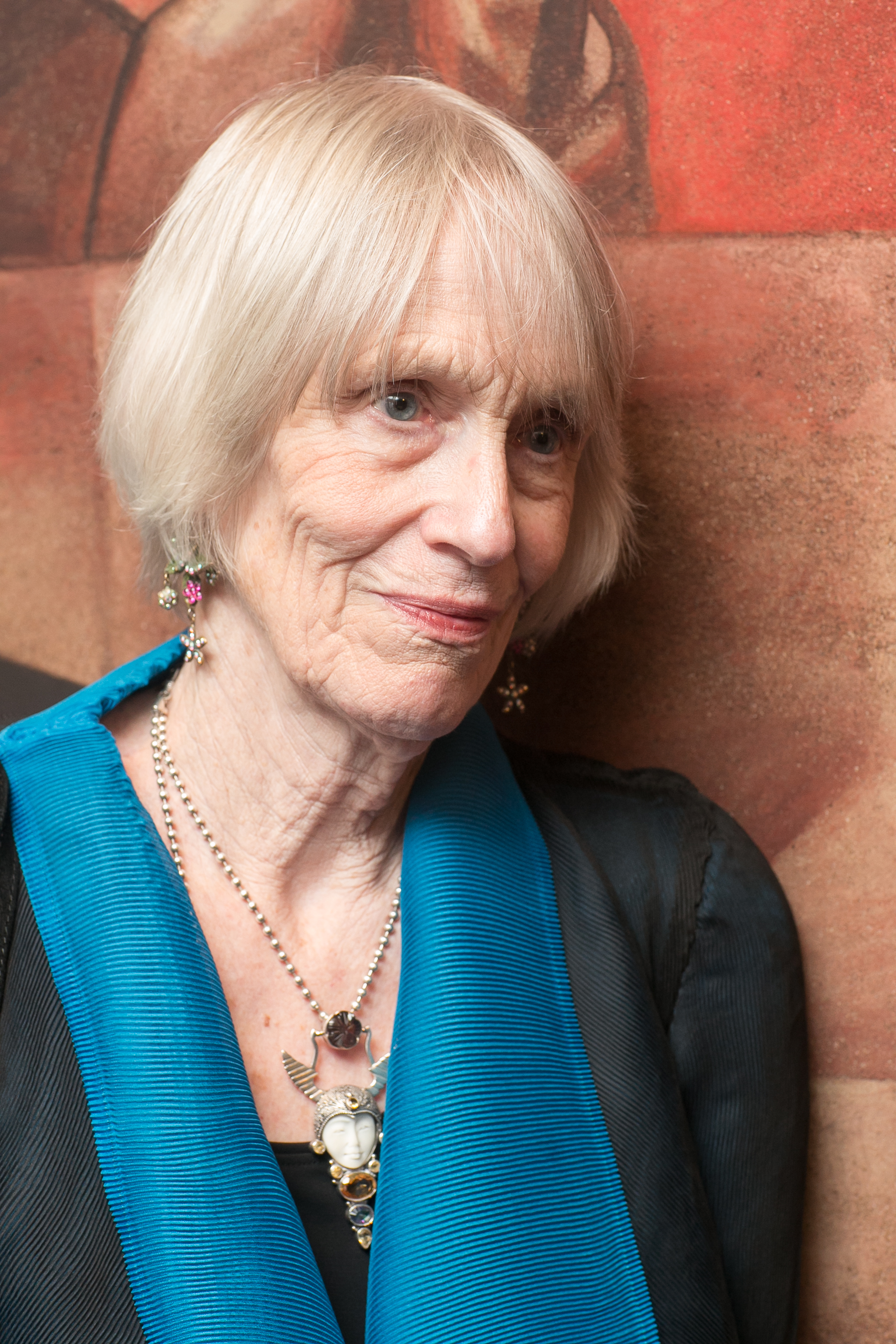
Tina Howe

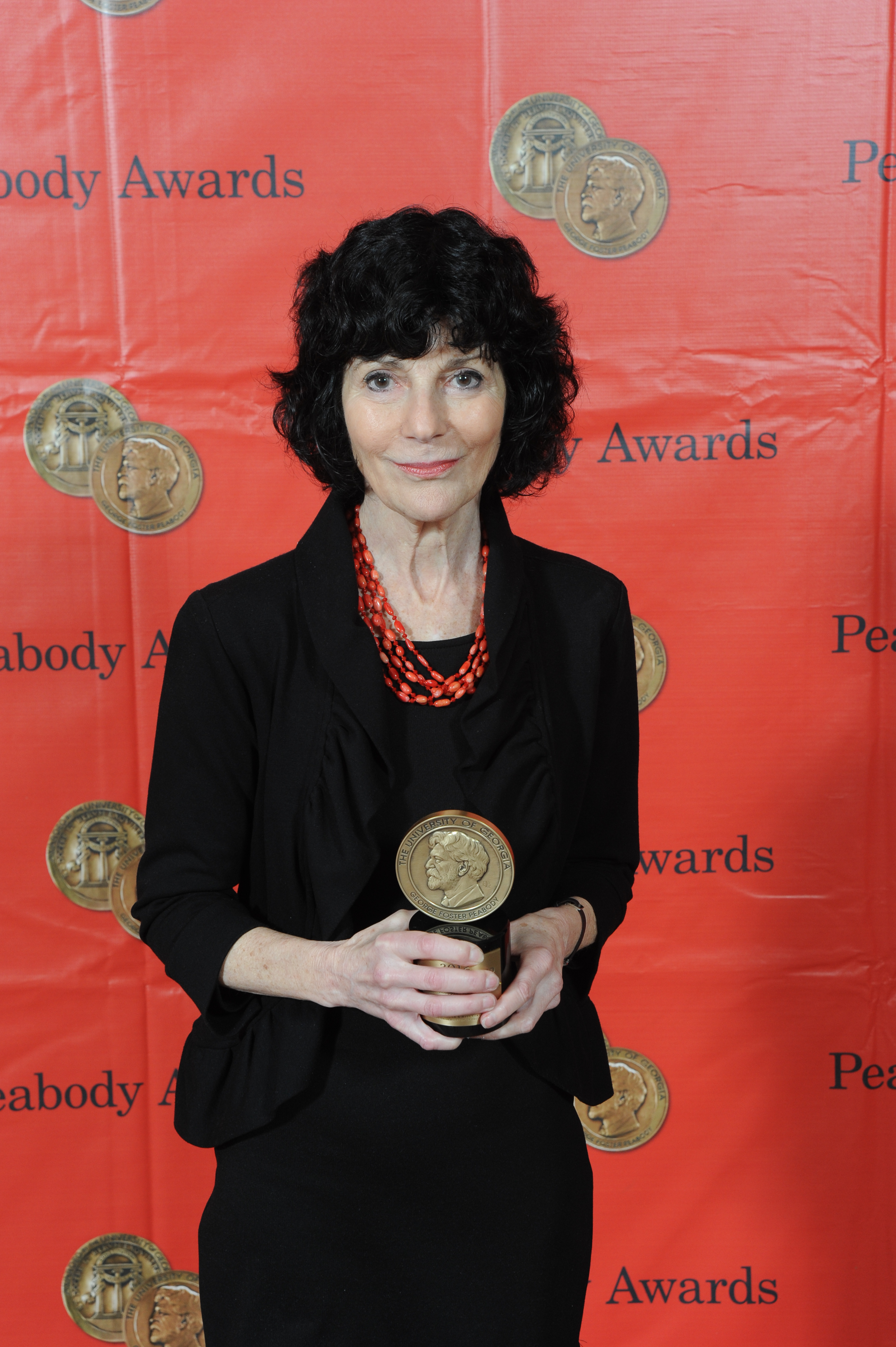
Nancy Buirski

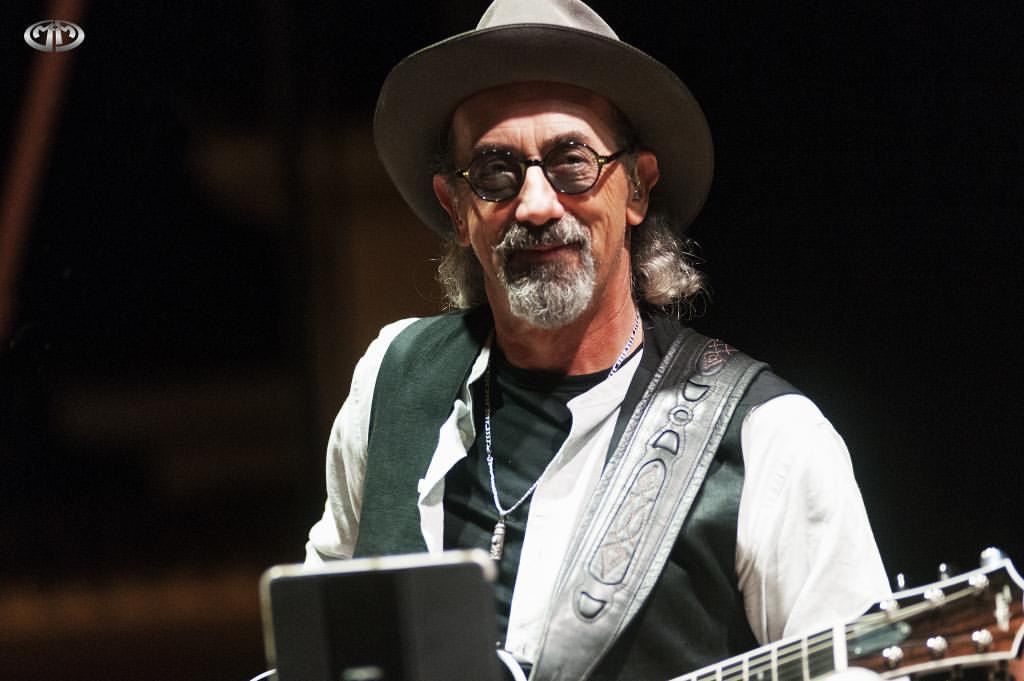
Jack Sonni

- August 1
  - Annabelle Gamson, 94, dancer and choreographer (b. 1928)
  - Howard Kunreuther, 84, economist (b. 1938)
  - David Le Batard, 50, graphic artist (b. 1972)
  - Dom Minasi, 80, jazz guitarist, composer and music producer (b. 1943)
  - Williamson Murray, 81, historian (b. 1941)
  - Wes Nisker, 80–81, author and Buddhism instructor (b. 1942)
  - Sheila Oliver, 71, politician, lieutenant governor of New Jersey (since 2018), member (2004–2018) and speaker (2010–2014) of the New Jersey General Assembly (b. 1952)
  - R. Stewart Wood, 89, Episcopal bishop (b. 1934)
- August 2
  - Charles Balentine, 60, basketball player (Arkansas Razorbacks) (b. 1962/1963)
  - Paul Brodeur, 92, journalist and writer (b. 1931)
  - Sherry Combs Johnson, 84, Hall of Fame rodeo barrel racer (b. 1938)
  - Constance Darnowski, 88, Olympic hurdler (1952, 1956) (b. 1934)
  - Delano Lewis, 84, diplomat, ambassador to South Africa (1999–2001) (b. 1938)
  - Mark E. Noennig, 75, politician (b. 1947)
  - Vincent Speranza, 98, World War II veteran (b. 1925)
- August 3
  - James Barnes, 61, convicted murderer (b. 1962)
  - James Cafiero, 94, politician, member of the New Jersey General Assembly (1968–1972) and Senate (1972–1982, 1990–2004) (b. 1928)
  - Walter Charles, 78, actor (Sweeney Todd: The Demon Barber of Fleet Street, Fletch Lives, Prancer) (b. 1945)
  - Carl Davis, 86, American-born British conductor and composer (The French Lieutenant's Woman, Pride and Prejudice, King David) (b. 1936)
  - Richard M. Goody, 102, British-born atmospheric physicist (b. 1921)
  - Charles Hardy, 57, competitive eater (b. 1966)
  - Mark Margolis, 83, actor (Breaking Bad, Oz, Scarface, Better Call Saul) (b. 1939)
  - Melvin George Talbert, 89, Methodist bishop (b. 1934)
  - Nechama Tec, 92, Polish-born sociologist and writer (b. 1931)
  - Adrienne Vaughan, 45, publishing house executive, president of Bloomsbury USA (b. 1977/1978)
- August 4
  - Jango Edwards, 73, clown and comedian (b. 1950)
  - Daniel W. Herzog, 82, Episcopal clergyman, bishop of Albany (1998–2007) (b. 1941)
  - Rhoda Karpatkin, 93, lawyer and consumers rights activist (b. 1930)
  - Charles Ogletree, 70, attorney and law professor (b. 1952)
  - Carmen Xtravaganza, 62, Spanish-born model and singer, depicted in Paris is Burning (b. 1961)
- August 5
  - Walter Bortz II, 93, physician and author (b. 1930)
  - Nermin Crnkić, 30, Bosnian-born soccer player (Tuzla City, Sarajevo, Jablonec) (b. 1992)
  - Tristan Honsinger, 73, cellist (b. 1949)
  - Slim Lehart, 88, country singer (b. 1935)
  - James J. Lindsay, 90, general (b. 1932)
  - Dennis M. Nagy, 80, air force lieutenant (b. 1943)
  - Arthur Schmidt, 86, film editor (Back to the Future, Who Framed Roger Rabbit, Forrest Gump), Oscar winner (1988, 1994) (b. 1937)
  - Herbert J. Siegel, 95, businessman (b. 1928)
  - Elton Veals, 62, football player (Pittsburgh Steelers) (b. 1961)
- August 6
  - Harold Hyman, 99, historian (b. 1924)
  - Roger Kramer, 84, American-born Canadian football player (Calgary Stampeders, Ottawa Rough Riders, Montreal Alouettes) (b. 1939)
  - David LaFlamme, 82, singer and violinist (It's a Beautiful Day) (b. 1941)
  - Harvey Meyerhoff, 96, businessman (b. 1927)
- August 7
  - DJ Casper, 58, DJ and songwriter ("Cha Cha Slide") (b. 1965)
  - Roland Freeman, 87, photographer (b. 1936)
  - William Friedkin, 87, film director (The French Connection, The Exorcist, To Live and Die in L.A.), Oscar winner (1971) (b. 1935)
  - Robert Giles, 90, newspaper editor and publisher (The Detroit News) (b. 1933)
  - Toussaint McCall, 89, R&B singer (b. 1934)
  - Jim Price, 81, baseball player (Detroit Tigers) and broadcaster (Detroit Tigers Radio Network, PASS), World Series Champion (1968) (b. 1941).
- August 8
  - Dorothy Casterline, 96, linguist (b. 1928)
  - Johnny Hardwick, 64, voice actor and writer (King of the Hill), Emmy winner (1999) (b. 1958)
  - Sixto Rodriguez, 81, singer-songwriter ("Sugar Man"), subject of Searching for Sugar Man (b. 1942)
  - Shelley Smith, 70, model and actress (The Associates) (b. 1952)
- August 9
  - Sean Dawkins, 52, football player (Indianapolis Colts, New Orleans Saints, Seattle Seahawks) (b. 1971)
  - Brice Marden, 84, painter (b. 1938)
  - Philip Sherman, 67, rabbi and mohel (b. 1956)
  - Robert Swan, 78, actor (Hoosiers, Natural Born Killers, Backdraft) (b. 1944)
- August 10
  - Patricia Bragg, 94, businesswoman, author, and health consultant (b. 1929)
  - Henry Dickerson, 71, basketball player (Detroit Pistons, Atlanta Hawks) and coach (Chattanooga Mocs) (b. 1951)
  - William George, 76, artist, actor (Dawn of the Dead) and stuntman (b. 1946/1947)
  - Rosemary S. Pooler, 85, jurist, judge of the U.S. District Court for the Northern District of New York (1994–1998) and the U.S. Court of Appeals for the Second Circuit (since 1998) (b. 1938)
  - Mike Santiago, 67, football coach (Stephen F. Austin Lumberjacks, Incarnate Word Cardinals) (b. 1955)
  - Brad Thomson, guitarist (The Tony Danza Tapdance Extravaganza). (death announced on this date)
  - Stan Waterman, 100, cinematographer (The Deep) and film producer (Blue Water, White Death) (b. 1923)
- August 11
  - Ellen Casey, 91, social advocate, first lady of Pennsylvania (1987–1995) (b. 1931/1932)
  - John Fielder, 73, photographer (b. 1950)
  - Jerome Hauer, 71, civil servant, director of the New York City Emergency Management (1996–2000) (b. 1951)
  - Tom Jones, 95, lyricist (The Fantasticks, 110 in the Shade, I Do! I Do!) (b. 1928)
  - Andy Larkin, 76, Olympic rower (1968) (b. 1946)
  - Judith Ann McKenzie, 81, biogeochemist (b. 1942)
  - Gus Solomons Jr., 84, dancer and choreographer (b. 1938)
  - Shoji Tabuchi, 79, Japanese-born fiddler (b. 1944)
  - Gregg Tafralis, 65, Olympic shot putter (1988) (b. 1958)
  - Dick Tomanek, 92, baseball player (Cleveland Indians, Kansas City Athletics) (b. 1931)
  - Mike Young, 74, restaurateur, co-founder of Chuy's (b. 1948/1949)
- August 13
  - Clarence Avant, 92, music executive, entrepreneur, and film producer (b. 1931)
  - Nelson Broms, 104, business executive, investor and philanthropist (b. 1919)
  - Alex Collins, 28, football player (Seattle Seahawks, Baltimore Ravens, Memphis Showboats) (b. 1994)
  - Peter Magadini, 81, drummer and author (The Musician's Guide to Polyrhythms) (b. 1942)
  - Magoo, 50, rapper (Timbaland & Magoo) (b. 1973) (death announced on this date)
  - Randy Minniear, 79, football player (New York Giants, Cleveland Browns) (b. 1943)
  - Rudy Schlesinger, 81, baseball player (Boston Red Sox) (b. 1941)
  - John L. Scott Jr., 69, politician, member of the South Carolina House of Representatives (1991–2009) and Senate (since 2009) (b. 1953)
- August 14
  - John L. Carroll, 79, judge and academic administrator (b. 1943)
  - Rich Landrum, 77, television broadcaster and professional wrestling announcer (JCP) (b. 1946)
- August 15
  - Gary Barnes, 83, football player (Green Bay Packers, Dallas Cowboys, Chicago Bears) (b. 1939)
  - Ada Deer, 88, civil servant, assistant secretary of the interior for Indian affairs (1993–1997) (b. 1935)
  - Chip Dox, 80, art director and production designer (Days of Our Lives) (b. 1942/1943)
- August 16
  - Howard S. Becker, 95, sociologist (b. 1928)
  - Jerry Moss, 88, Hall of Fame recording executive, co-founder of A&M Records (b. 1935)
  - Chai Yitzchok Twerski, 91, Palestinian-born rabbi (b. 1931)
- August 17
  - Walter Aipolani, 68, singer (b. 1955)
  - Art Collector, 6, racehorse (b. 2017)
  - Karol J. Bobko, 85, astronaut (STS-6, STS-51-D, STS-51-J) (b. 1937)
  - Bobby Eli, 77, guitarist (MFSB), songwriter ("Love Won't Let Me Wait"), and record producer (b. 1946)
  - Robert Ekelund, 82, economist (b. 1940)
  - Wayne Gilbert, 76, artist (b. 1946)
  - Wallace H. Nutting, 95, general (b. 1928)
  - Betty Tyson, 75, woman wrongly convicted of murder (b. 1948)
  - Gary Young, 70, drummer (Pavement) (b. 1953)
- August 18
  - James L. Buckley, 100, jurist and politician, U.S. senator (1971–1977), counselor of the United States Department of State (1982) and judge of the U.S. Court of Appeals for the District of Columbia Circuit (since 1985) (b. 1923)
  - Laura Ann Carleton, 66, clothing store owner (b. 1956/1957)
  - Cave Rock, 3, Thoroughbred racehorse (b. 2020)
  - Nancy Frangione, 70, actress (Another World) (b. 1953)
  - Ray Hildebrand, 82, musician (Paul & Paula) (b. 1940)
  - Lolita, 57, orca (b. 1966)
  - Richard Luft, 85, politician, member of the Illinois House of Representatives (1975–1979) and Senate (1983–1993) (b. 1938)
  - Al Quie, 99, politician, governor of Minnesota (1979–1983), member of the Minnesota Senate (1955–1958) and U.S. House of Representatives (1958–1979) (b. 1923)
  - Casper Roos, 98, actor (Deadtime Stories) (b. 1925)
- August 19
  - Maxie Baughan, 85, Hall of Fame football player (Philadelphia Eagles, Los Angeles Rams) and coach (Cornell Big Red) (b. 1938)
  - James Burke, 97, space engineer (b. 1927)
  - Gloria Coates, 89, American-born German composer (b. 1933)
  - Alex Cole, 58, baseball player (Pittsburgh Pirates, Cleveland Indians, Minnesota Twins) (b. 1965) (death announced on this date)
  - Douglas Coler, 63, actor (Days of Our Lives) (b. 1960)
  - Carl Crennel, 74, football player (Pittsburgh Steelers, Montreal Alouettes, Hamilton Tiger-Cats) (b. 1948)
  - Dan Green, 70, comic book artist (Spider-Man, Wolverine, Doctor Strange) (b. 1952)
  - Howard James Hubbard, 84, Roman Catholic prelate, bishop of Albany (1977–2014) (b. 1938)
  - Ron Cephas Jones, 66, actor (This Is Us, Luke Cage, Mr. Robot), Emmy winner (2018, 2020) (b. 1957)
  - James Parker, 47, Olympic hammer thrower (2004) (b. 1975)
  - John Warnock, 82, computer scientist (Adobe Systems Inc.) (b. 1940)
  - Eleanor Weinstock, 94, politician, member of the Florida House of Representatives (1978–1986) and Senate (1987–1992) (b. 1929)
- August 20
  - Peter P. Garibaldi, 91, politician, member of the New Jersey Senate (1984–1988) and General Assembly (1968–1974) (b. 1931)
  - David Jacobs, 84, television writer, producer and director (Dallas, Knots Landing, Paradise) (b. 1939)
  - Dale Patchett, 73, politician, member of the Florida House of Representatives (1976–1990) (b. 1950)
  - Mickey Rupp, 87, racecar driver (b. 1936)
  - Vic Seipke, 91, bodybuilder (b. 1932)
  - Howard Spodek, 81, historian (b. 1941)
  - Jerry Turner, 69, baseball player (San Diego Padres, Detroit Tigers, Chicago White Sox) (b. 1954)
  - Bill Vukovich II, 79, racing driver (b. 1944)
- August 21
  - Laszlo Birinyi, 79, Hungarian-born investor and businessman (b. 1943)
  - Elizabeth Hoffman, 97, actress (Fear No Evil, Born on the Fourth of July, Sisters) (b. 1926)
  - Carlos Pérez, 88, Colombian-born oncologist (b. 1934)
- August 22
  - Tom Courtney, 90, sprinter, double Olympic champion (1956) (b. 1933)
  - Peter Gonzales Falcon, 75, actor (L'ospite, Roma, The End) (b. 1947/1948)
  - Nathan Louis Jackson, 44, producer, screenwriter (13 Reasons Why) and playwright (b. 1978/1979)
  - C. R. Rao, 102, Indian-born mathematician and statistician (Cramér–Rao bound, Rao–Blackwell theorem) (b. 1920)
  - Jim Romaniszyn, 71, football player (Cleveland Browns, New England Patriots) (b. 1951)
  - Vaccine, 43, musician and record producer (b. 1979)
- August 23
  - Bob Feldman, 83, songwriter ("My Boyfriend's Back", "I Want Candy") and record producer ("Hang On Sloopy") (b. 1940)
  - Terry Funk, 79, Hall of Fame professional wrestler (NWA, WWF) and actor (Paradise Alley, Over the Top, Road House) (b. 1944)
  - Chryss Goulandris, Lady O'Reilly, 73, Greek-born businesswoman (b. 1950)
  - Robert Hale, 90, bass-baritone opera singer (New York City Opera, Deutsche Oper Berlin) (b. 1933)
  - Joseph Hubert Hart, 91, Roman Catholic prelate, auxiliary bishop (1976–1978) and bishop (1978–2001) of Cheyenne (b. 1931)
  - Warren Hoge, 82, journalist (The New York Times) (b. 1941)
  - Hersha Parady, 78, actress (Little House on the Prairie, Hyper Sapien: People from Another Star, CBS Afternoon Playhouse) (b. 1945)
  - Norman Pfeiffer, 82, architect (b. 1940)
  - Steve Sidwell, 78, football coach (Colorado Buffaloes, New England Patriots, New Orleans Saints) (b. 1944)
  - Ralph Smith, 84, football player (Cleveland Browns, Philadelphia Eagles, Atlanta Falcons) (b. 1938)
- August 24
  - Craig Henriquez, 64, biomedical engineer (b. 1958/1959)
  - Lawrence Francis Kramer, 90, politician, mayor of Paterson, New Jersey (1967–1972, 1975–1982) (b. 1933)
  - George Montgomery, 90, drag racer (b. 1933)
  - Barbara Rossi, 82, artist (b. 1940)
  - Aaron Schechter, 95, Haredi rabbi (b. 1928)
  - Arleen Sorkin, 67, actress (Batman: The Animated Series, Days of Our Lives, Duet) (b. 1955)
  - Bray Wyatt, 36, professional wrestler (WWE) (b. 1987)
  - Ta'Kiya Young, 21, alleged shoplifter (b. 2001/2002)
- August 25
  - Walt Curtis, 82, poet (b. 1941)
- August 26
  - Bob Barker, 99, game show host (The Price Is Right, Truth or Consequences) and animal rights activist (b. 1923)
  - John Benton-Harris, 83, photographer (b. 1939)
  - Jerold A. Edmondson, 81, linguist (b. 1941)
  - Carl Cohen, 92, philosopher (b. 1932)
  - John Kezdy, 64, punk singer (The Effigies) and attorney (b. 1958/1959)
  - Clay Mathile, 82, pet food industry executive, CEO of Iams (1982–1999) (b. 1941)
  - Tony Roberts, 94, sportscaster (Notre Dame Fighting Irish football) (b. 1928)
- August 27
  - Pat Corrales, 82, baseball player (Philadelphia Phillies, Cincinnati Reds) and manager (Texas Rangers), World Series winner (1995) (b. 1941)
  - Robert C. Holub, 74, Germanist and academic administrator, chancellor of UMass (2008–2012) (b. 1949)
  - Mac Huddleston, 79, politician, member of the Mississippi House of Representatives (since 2008) (b. 1943)
  - Joe the Plumber, 49, conservative activist and commentator (b. 1973)
  - Brian McBride, 53, musician (Stars of the Lid, Bell Gardens) (b. 1970) (death announced on this date)
  - J. Tinsley Oden, 86, engineer, founder of the Oden Institute for Computational Engineering and Sciences (b. 1936)
  - Franne Lee, 81, costume designer (Candide, Sweeney Todd: The Demon Barber of Fleet Street, Saturday Night Live) (b. 1941)
  - Eddie Skoller, 79, American-born Danish singer and actor (b. 1944)
  - Rich Stubler, 74, football coach (Toronto Argonauts, Hamilton Tiger-Cats, Edmonton Eskimos) (b. 1949)
  - Don Sundquist, 87, politician, governor of Tennessee (1995–2003), member of the U.S. House of Representatives (1983–1995) (b. 1936)
  - Fritz H. Windhorst, 88, jurist, lawyer and politician, member of the Louisiana State Senate (1972–1992) (b. 1935)
- August 28
  - August 08, 31, R&B singer-songwriter ("I'm the One") and producer (b. 1992)
  - James Casey, 40, saxophonist (Trey Anastasio Band) (b. 1982/1983)
  - Len Chandler, 88, folk musician (b. 1935)
  - Janet Dean Fodor, 81, linguist.
  - Tina Howe, 85, playwright (The Art of Dining, Painting Churches, Coastal Disturbances, Pride's Crossing) (b. 1937)
  - Carl C. Johnson, 97, Army Air Force colonel (Tuskegee Airmen) (b. 1926)
  - Edith Graef McGeer, 99, neuroscientist (b. 1923)
  - Dennis J. Murphy, 91, major general (b. 1932)
  - Sarava, 24, Thoroughbred racehorse (b. 1999)
  - Sonny Seiler, 90, attorney and football mascot owner (Uga) (b. 1933)
  - Teeuwynn Woodruff, 54–55, writer and game designer (Dungeons & Dragons, Wraith: The Oblivion, World of Darkness) (b. 1968)
  - John Zajac Jr., 90, politician (b. 1932)
- August 29
  - Coolidge Ball, 71, basketball player (Ole Miss Rebels) (b. 1951)
  - Don Browne, 80, television executive (Telemundo, NBC News) (b. 1943)
  - Nancy Buirski, 78, film director (A Crime on the Bayou, Desperate Souls, Dark City and the Legend of Midnight Cowboy) and producer (Loving) (b. 1945)
  - Ahmo Hight, 50, fitness model and actress (b. 1972/1973)
  - Robert Klane, 81, novelist and screenwriter (The Man with One Red Shoe, National Lampoon's European Vacation, Weekend at Bernie's) (b. 1941)
  - E. Denise Lee, 71, politician (b. 1952).
- August 30
  - Norman Rodgers, 95, politician, member of the Iowa State Senate (1973–1987) (b. 1927)
  - Jack Sonni, 68, musician (Dire Straits), marketing executive and writer (b. 1954)
- August 31
  - Gil Brandt, 91, NFL Hall of Fame football executive (Dallas Cowboys, Los Angeles Rams, San Francisco 49ers) (b. 1932)
  - Aram Chobanian, 94, educator, president of Boston University (2005) (b. 1929)
  - Robert Clegg Jr., 69, politician, member of the New Hampshire Senate (2002–2008) (b. 1954)
  - Steve Crump, 65–66, journalist (WBTV) and documentary film producer (b. 1957)
  - Gayle Hunnicutt, 80, actress (Dallas, Eye of the Cat, Marlowe, Fragment of Fear) (b. 1943)
  - Douglas Lenat, 72, artificial intelligence researcher, founder and CEO of Cycorp (b. 1950)
  - Marti Maraden, 78, American-born Canadian actress (b. 1945)
  - Bill Pinkney, 87, Hall of Fame sailor (b. 1935)
  - Sarah Young, 77, author (Jesus Calling) (b. 1945/1946)

== September ==
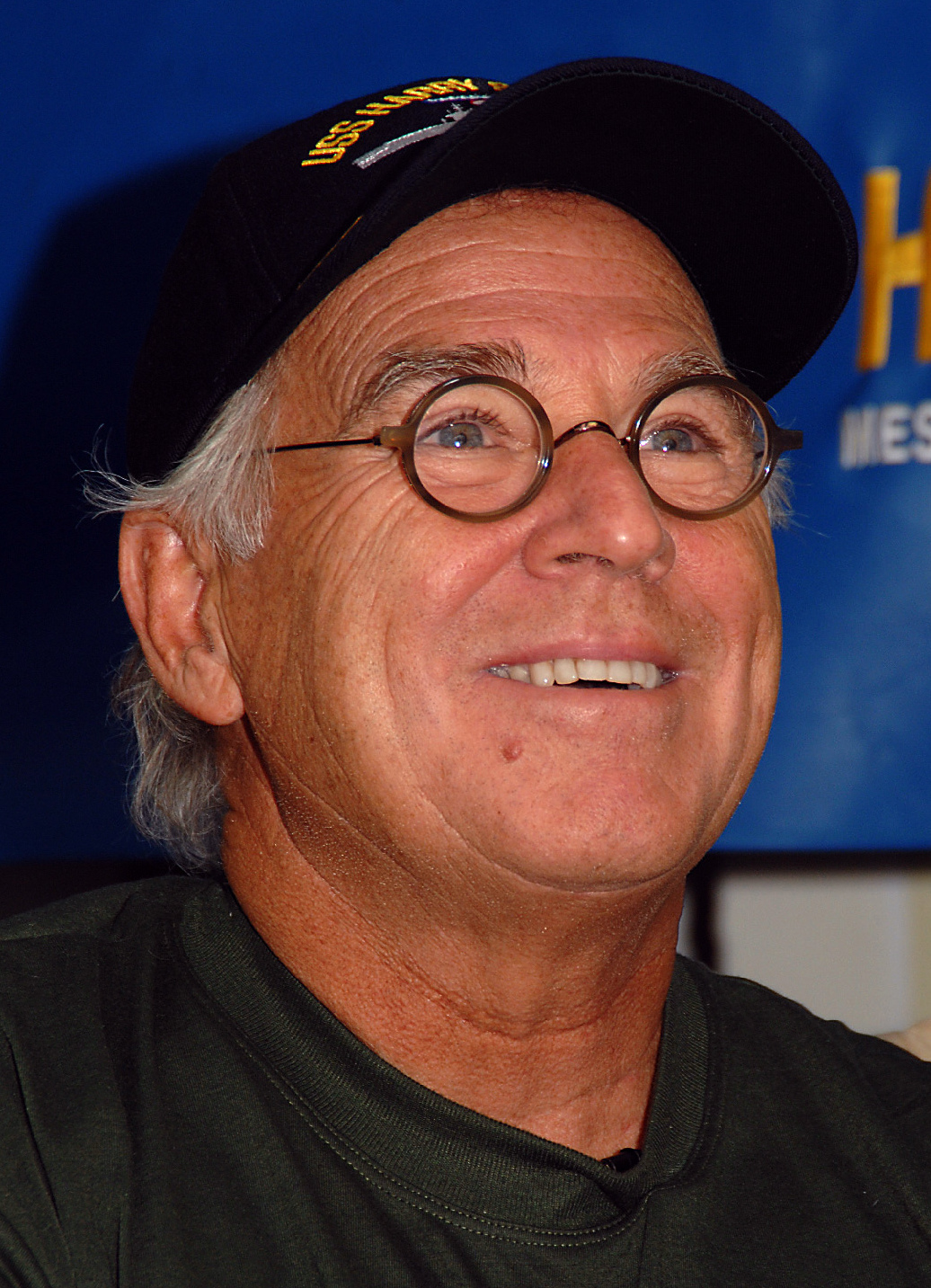
Jimmy Buffett

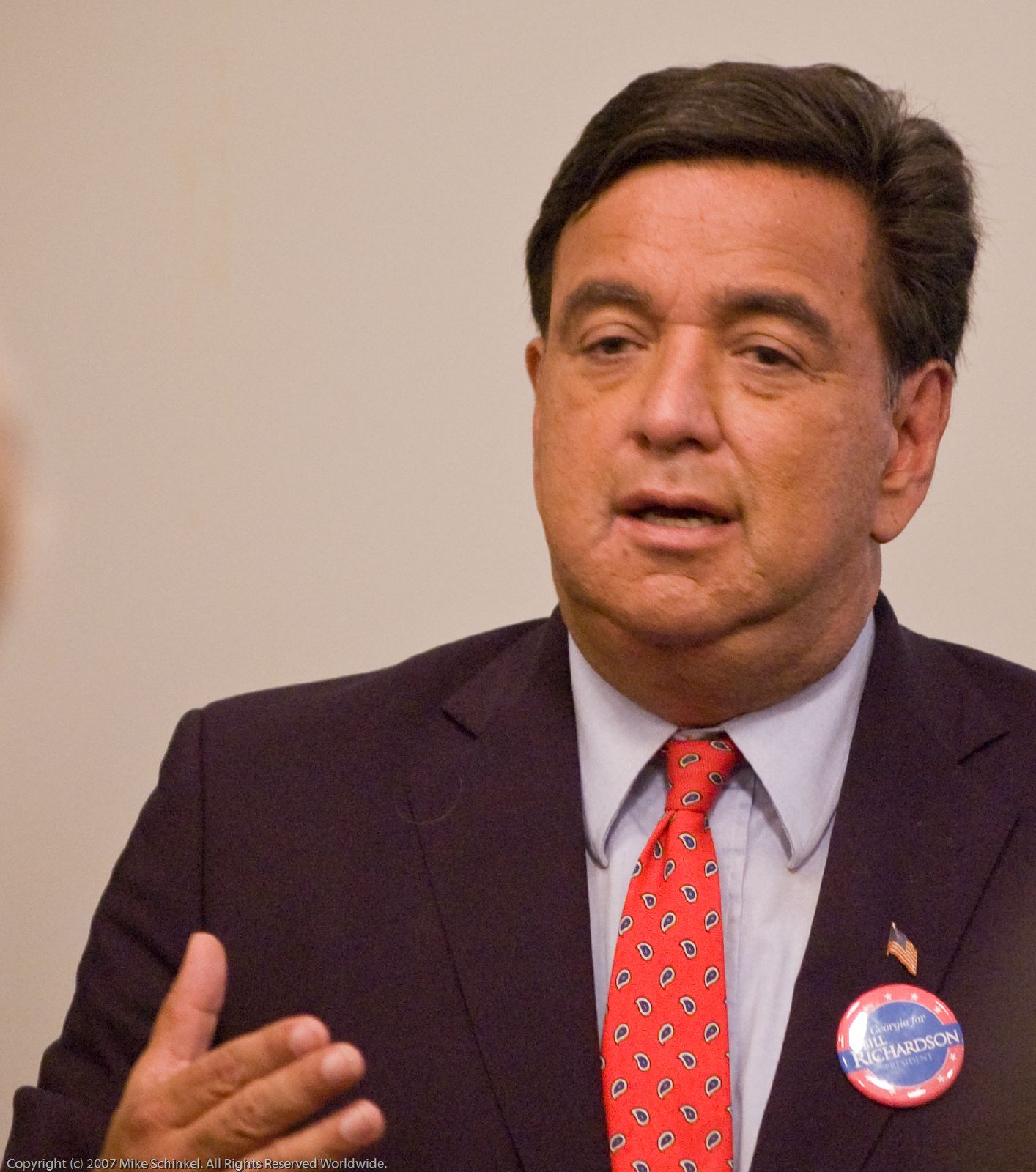
Bill Richardson

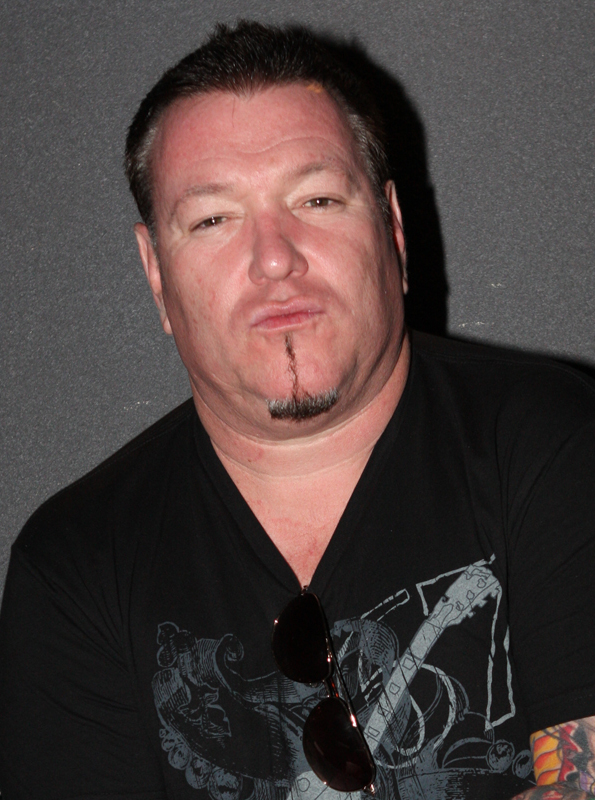
Steve Harwell

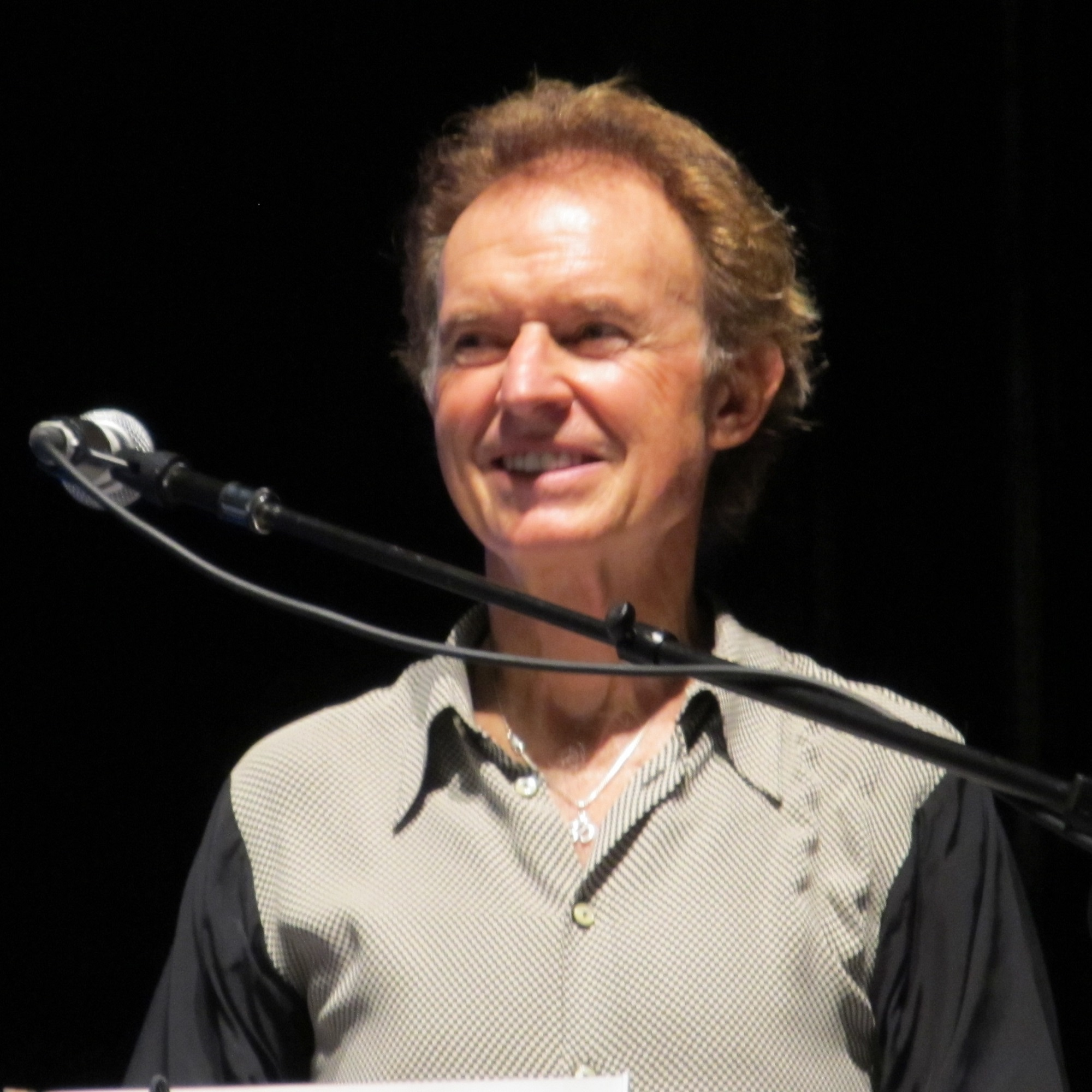
Gary Wright

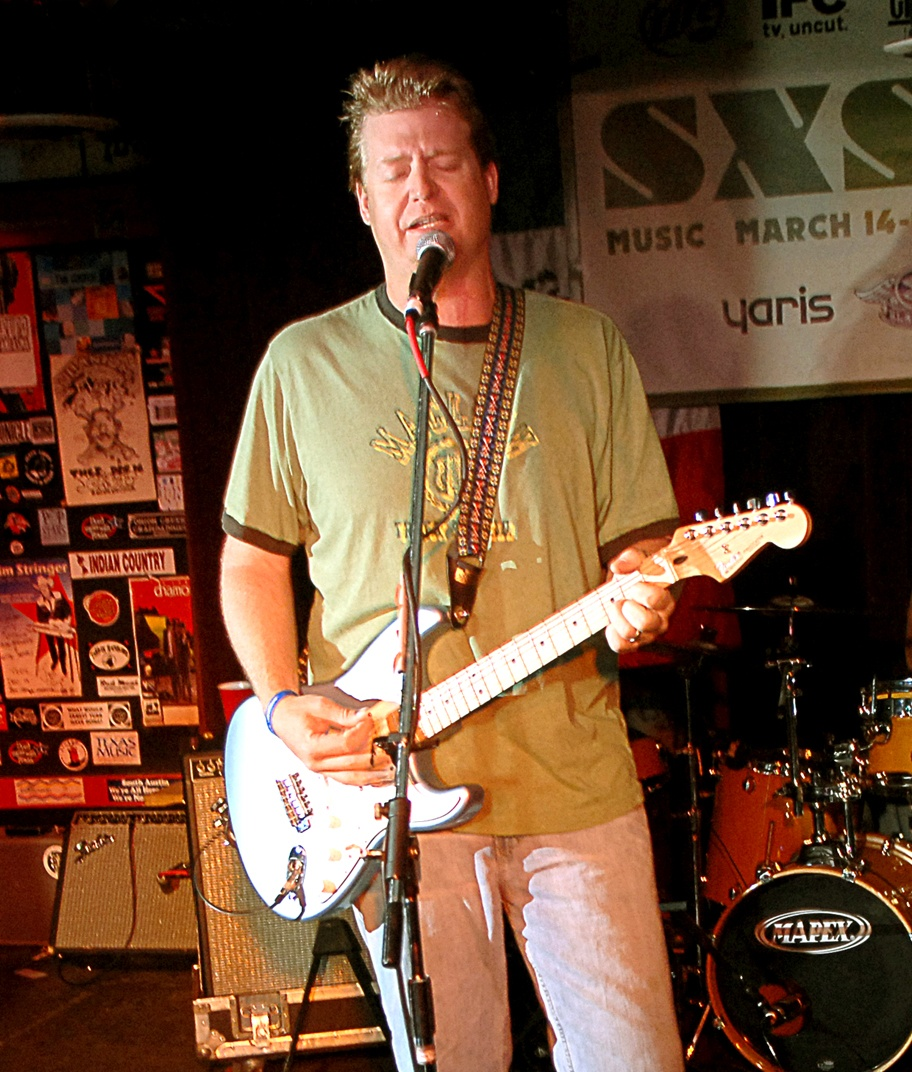
Charlie Robison

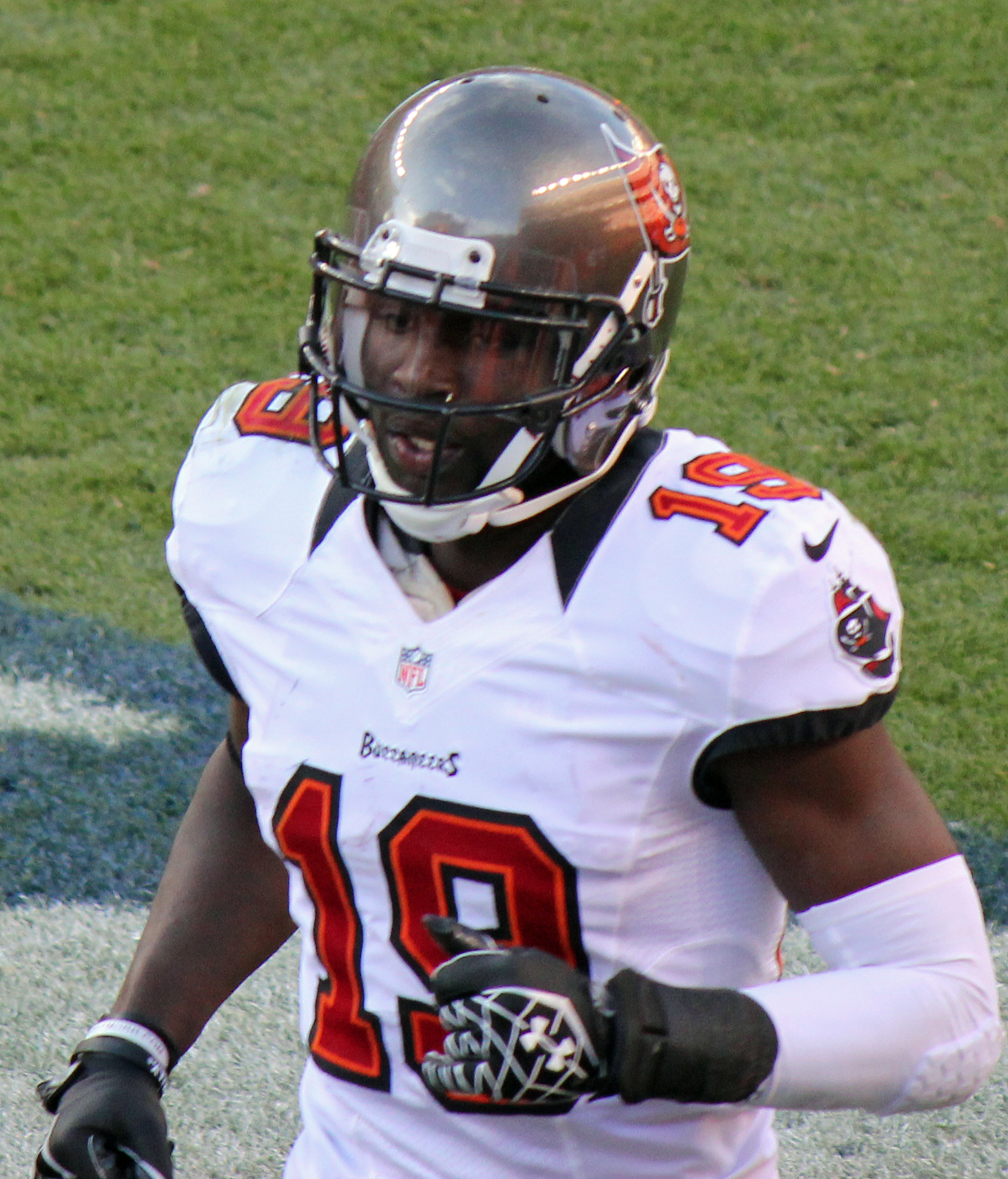
Mike Williams

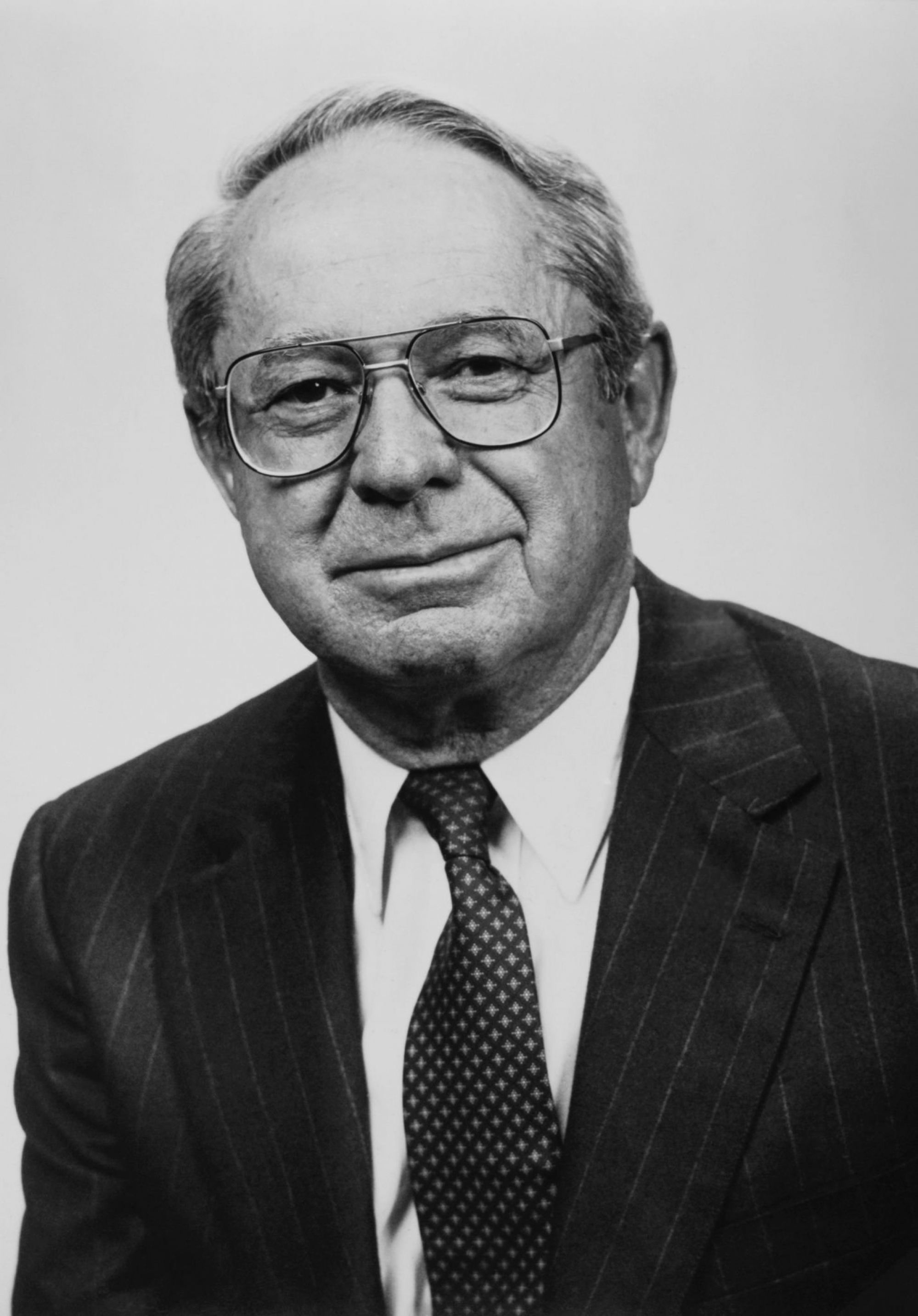
Lauch Faircloth

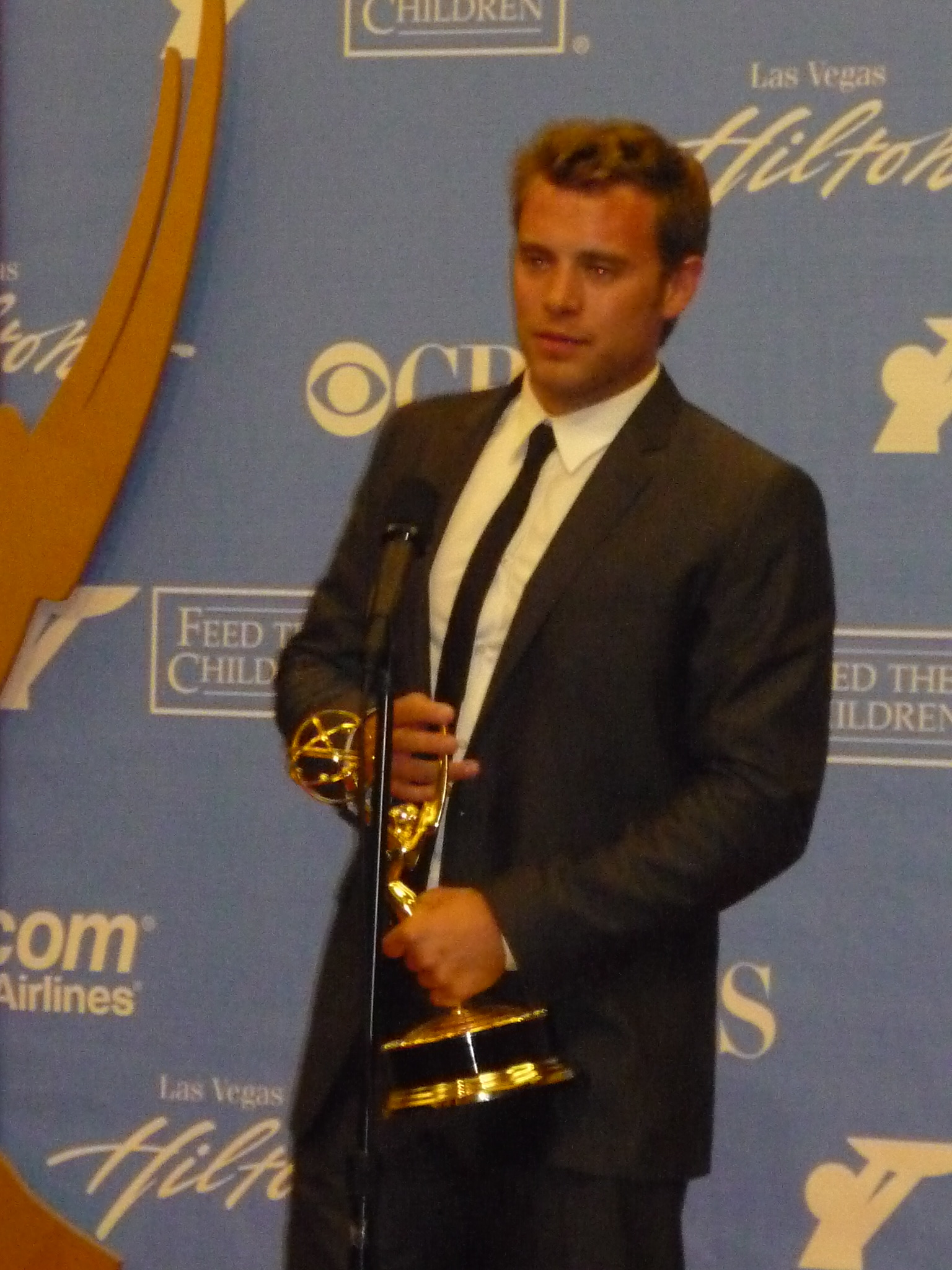
Billy Miller

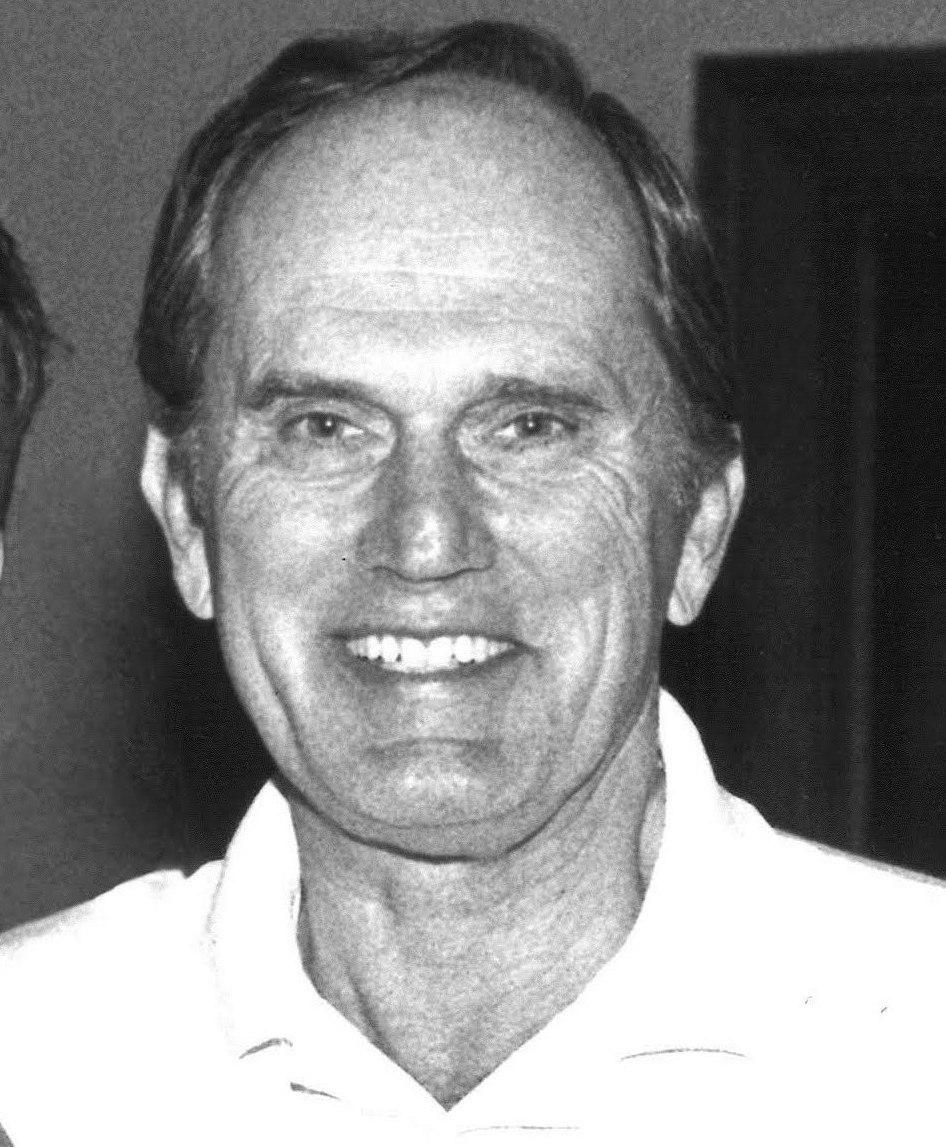
Brereton C. Jones

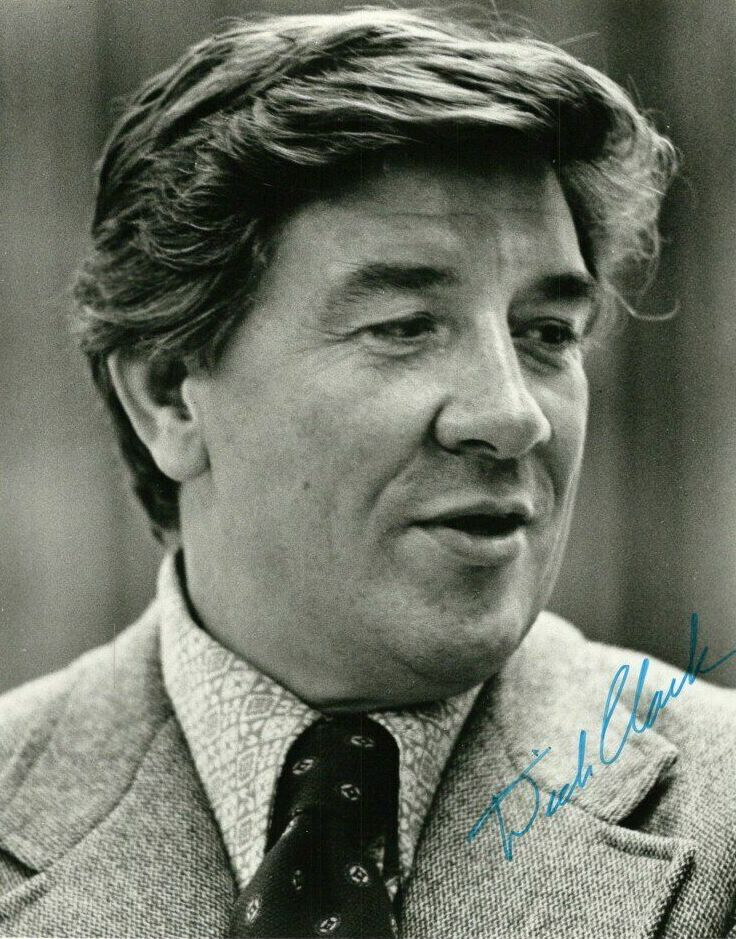
Dick Clark

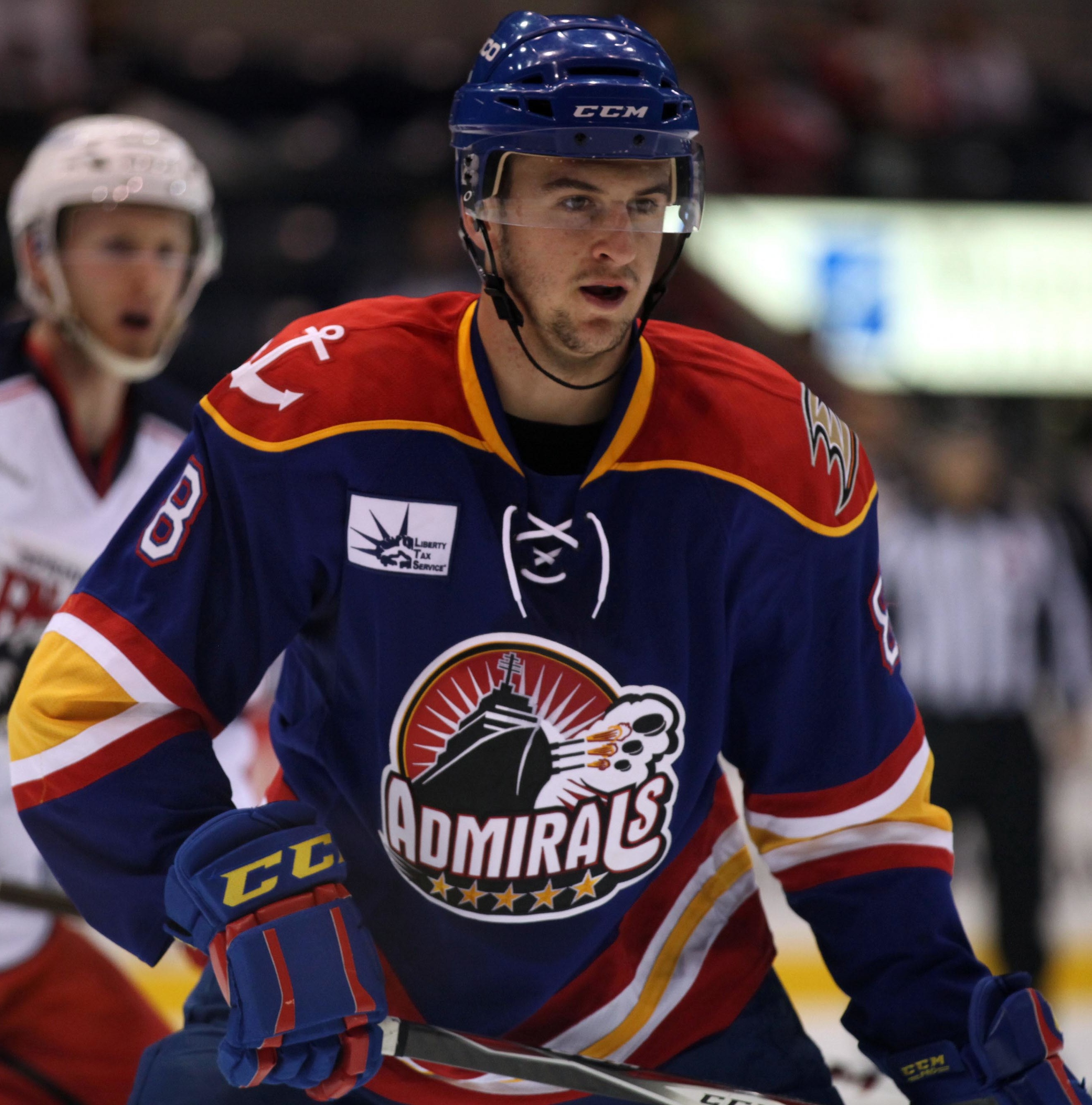
Nic Kerdiles

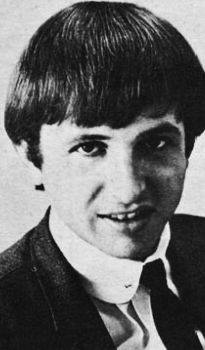
Terry Kirkman

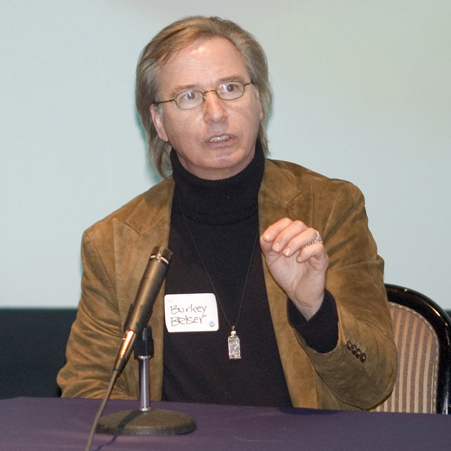
Burkey Belser

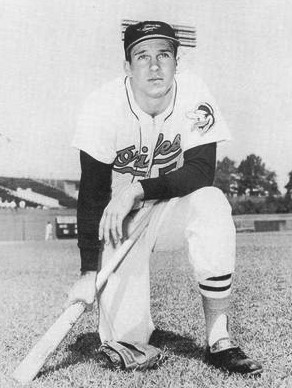
Brooks Robinson

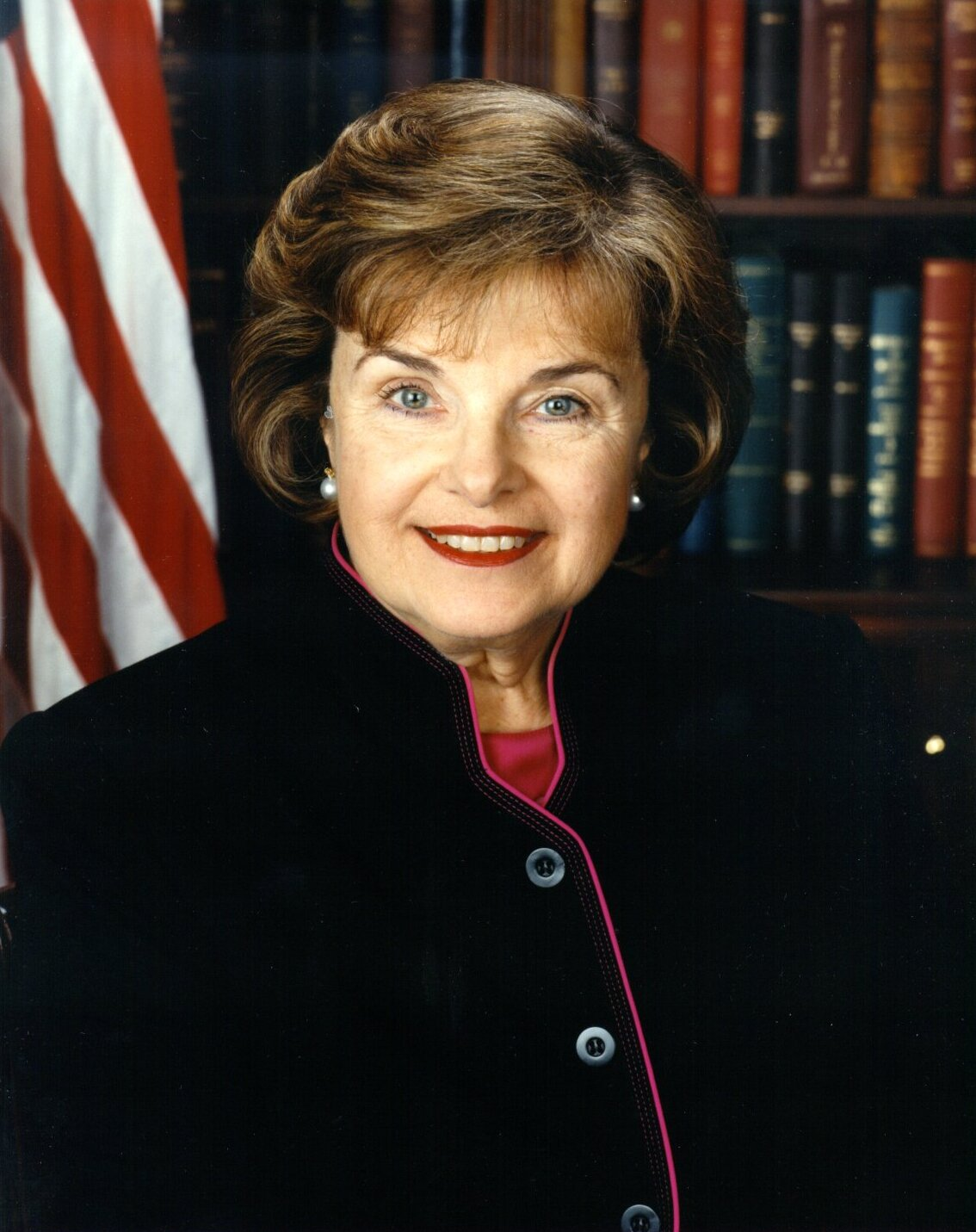
Dianne Feinstein

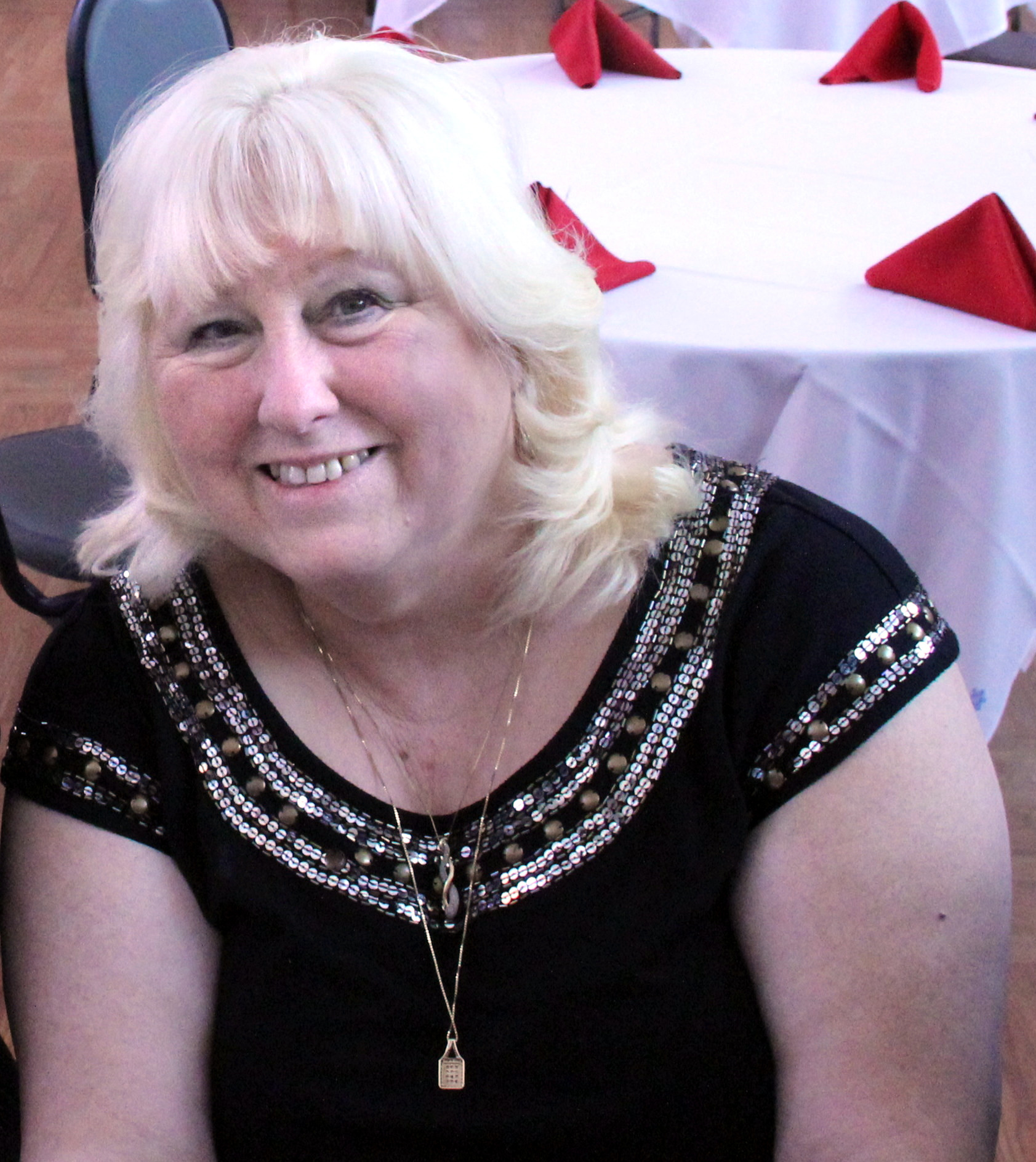
Joyce Grable

- September 1
  - Dennis Austin, 76, computer programmer, co-creator of Microsoft PowerPoint (b. 1947)
  - Robert Becerra, 64, guitarist (Stains) (b. 1958/1959)
  - Jimmy Buffett, 76, singer-songwriter ("Margaritaville", "Come Monday", "Cheeseburger in Paradise") and businessman, founder of Jimmy Buffett's Margaritaville (b. 1946)
  - Gerald P. Carmen, 93, diplomat, representative to the European Office of the UN (1984–1986) and administrator of the GSA (1981–1984) (b. 1930)
  - Elton Gissendanner, 95, veterinarian and politician, member of the Florida House of Representatives (1967–1968) (b. 1927)
  - Bill Malley, 88, production designer (The Exorcist, The Fury, The Ninth Configuration) (b. 1934)
  - Bill Richardson, 75, politician, diplomat, ambassador of the United States to the United Nations (1997–1998), Secretary of Energy (1998–2001) and governor of New Mexico (2003–2011) (b. 1947)
  - Nels J. Smith, 84, politician, member (1963–1979) and speaker of (1977–1979) the Wyoming House of Representatives (b. 1939)
  - Tempt One, 54, graffiti artist (b. 1968/1969)
- September 2
  - Walter Arlen, 103, Austrian-born composer and music critic (b. 1920)
  - Max Gomez, 72, Cuban-born medical journalist (WNBC, WCBS-TV) (b. 1951)
  - Robert A. Lamb, 72, British-born virologist (b. 1950)
  - Ilija Mitić, 83, Serbian-born soccer player (San Jose Earthquakes, Oakland Clippers, United States national team) (b. 1940)
  - Marcia de Rousse, 70, actress (True Blood, St. Elsewhere, Schooled) (b. 1953)
  - Shannon Wilcox, 80, actress (The Border, Six Weeks, Songwriter) (b. 1942/1943)
- September 3
  - Ruschell Boone, 48, Jamaican-born newscaster (NY1) (b. 1975)
  - Paul Roach, 95, football coach (Wyoming Cowboys, Denver Broncos, Oakland Raiders) (b. 1927)
- September 4
  - Wilma Briggs, 92, baseball player (Fort Wayne Daisies, South Bend Blue Sox) (b. 1930)
  - Edith Grossman, 87, literary translator (b. 1936)
  - Steve Harwell, 56, singer (Smash Mouth) (b. 1967)
  - Tail Dragger Jones, 82, Chicago blues singer (b. 1940)
  - Tirso del Junco, 98, Cuban-born politician and Olympic rower (1948) (b. 1925)
  - Ed Meador, 86, football player (Los Angeles Rams) (b. 1937)
  - Ferid Murad, 86, physician and pharmacologist, Nobel Prize recipient (1998) (b. 1936)
  - John Wolfe Jr., 69, attorney and politician (b. 1954)
  - Gary Wright, 80, singer-songwriter ("Dream Weaver", "Love Is Alive") and musician (Spooky Tooth) (b. 1943)
- September 5
  - Tom Davies, 48, British-born bassist (Nebula) (b. 1974/1975)
  - Lee Halliday, 95, singer and record producer (b. 1927)
  - Molly Holzschlag, 60, author, lecturer and advocate of the Open Web (b. 1963)
  - George Lefont, 85, movie theater owner (Plaza Theatre) (b. 1938)
- September 6
  - Larry Chance, 82, doo-wop singer (The Earls) (b. 1940)
  - Richard Davis, 93, jazz bassist (b. 1930)
  - Jim Tom Hedrick, 82, television personality (Moonshiners) (b. 1940)
  - Steve Roden, 59, contemporary artist and musician (b. 1964)
  - Louis Vitale, 91, Franciscan friar and peace activist, co-founder of Nevada Desert Experience (b. 1932)
  - Whitey Von Nieda, 101, basketball player (Baltimore Bullets) (b. 1922)
- September 7
  - Charles Gayle, 84, jazz saxophonist and pianist (b. 1939)
  - Geechy Guy, 59, stand-up comedian (b. 1964)
  - Johnny Mathis, 80, basketball player (New Jersey Americans, Allentown Jets) (b. 1943)
  - Ginger Mayson, 68, college volleyball coach (Michigan State Spartans) (b. 1954/1955)
- September 8
  - Mylon LeFevre, 78, Christian rock singer (b. 1944)
  - Lisa Lyon, 70, bodybuilder (b. 1953)
  - Brett Sawyer, 63, professional wrestler (NWA, SCW) (b. 1960)
  - Nancy Storrs, 73, Olympic rower (1976) (b. 1950)
  - Anthony Sully, 79, serial killer (b. 1944)
  - Felicia Taylor, 59, news correspondent (CNN International) (b. 1964)
  - Norma O. Walker, 95, politician, mayor of Aurora, Colorado (1965–1967) (b. 1928)
- September 9
  - William B. Black, 81, politician, member of the Illinois House of Representatives (1986–2010) (b. 1941)
- September 10
  - Robert S. Bennett, 84, attorney (Clinton–Lewinsky scandal) (b. 1939)
  - Maureen Mann, 79, politician, member of the New Hampshire House of Representatives (b. 1944).
  - Charlie Robison, 59, country singer-songwriter ("I Want You Bad", "El Cerrito Place") (b. 1964)
  - Matthew Stewart, 41, trumpeter (Streetlight Manifesto) (b. 1981/1982)
  - Mabel Walker, 94, Olympic sprinter (1948) (b. 1928)
- September 11
  - Dick Bertel, 92, radio and television personality (NBC, Mutual Broadcasting System, Voice of America) (b. 1931)
  - Point Given, 25, Thoroughbred racehorse (b. 1998)
  - Ronald L. Rencher, 82, politician, member (1971–1976) and speaker (1975–1976) of the Utah House of Representatives, U.S. attorney for the District of Utah (1977–1981) (b. 1941)
  - Howard Safir, 81, law enforcement official, New York City police (1996–2000) and fire (1994–1996) commissioner (b. 1942)
  - Mary Terrall, 71, academic and science historian (b. 1952)
- September 12
  - Brandon Hunter, 42, basketball player (Boston Celtics, Orlando Magic) (b. 1980)
  - Roy Kidd, 91, Hall of Fame college football coach (Eastern Kentucky) (b. 1931)
  - Pete Kozachik, 72, visual effects artist (The Nightmare Before Christmas, Corpse Bride, Coraline) (b. 1950/1951)
  - Mike Williams, 36, football player (Tampa Bay Buccaneers, Buffalo Bills) (b. 1987)
  - Zeus, 3, Great Dane dog, world's tallest dog (b. 2019)
- September 13
  - James E. Kieffer, 80, politician, member of the North Dakota House of Representatives (1971–1972) (b. 1943)
  - Joseph J. Kohn, 91, Czechoslovak-born academic and mathematician (b. 1932)
  - Marvin E. Newman, 95, photographer (b. 1927)
  - Buzzy Peltola, 58, politician (b. 1965)
- September 14
  - Robert Addison Day, 79, businessman (b. 1943)
  - Pearl Bowser, 92, film historian and director (Midnight Ramble) (b. 1931)
  - Robert Tree Cody, 72, musician (b. 1951)
  - Lauch Faircloth, 95, politician, senator (1993–1999) and North Carolina secretary of commerce (1977–1985) (b. 1928)
  - Carol Harter, 82, academic administrator, president of the University of Nevada, Las Vegas (1995–2006) (b. 1941)
  - Fred Lewis, 72, percussionist (Lakeside) (b. 1950/1951)
  - Joseph Massino, 80, mobster (b. 1943)
  - Michael McGrath, 65, actor (Tootsie, Spamalot, Nice Work If You Can Get It, The Secret of Kells) and Tony winner (2012) (b. 1957)
  - Scott Taylor, 78, Olympic pentathlete (1972) (b. 1945)
- September 15
  - Prudence McIntyre, 78, singer (Patience and Prudence) (b. 1945)
  - Billy Miller, 43, actor (The Young and the Restless, General Hospital) (b. 1979)
- September 16
  - Dick Curtis, 95, actor (The Day It Came to Earth, Motel Hell, What Waits Below) (b. 1927/1928)
  - Victor Fuchs, 99, health economist (b. 1924)
  - Irish Grinstead, 43, R&B singer (702) (b. 1980)
  - Gita Mehta, 80, Indian-born writer (Karma Cola, A River Sutra) and filmmaker (b. 1943)
- September 17
  - Roric Harrison, 76, baseball player (Atlanta Braves, Baltimore Orioles, Minnesota Twins) (b. 1946)
- September 18
  - Harold Baker, 93, jurist, judge of the U.S. District Court for Eastern Illinois (1978–1979), U.S. District Court for Central Illinois (1979–2022), and the U.S. Foreign Intelligence Surveillance Court (1998–2005) (b. 1929)
  - Henry Boucha, 72, ice hockey player (Detroit Red Wings, Minnesota North Stars), Olympic silver medalist (1972) (b. 1951)
  - Constance Clayton, 89, educator and civic leader (b. 1933)
  - Leina'ala Drummond, 77, model, Miss Hawaii (1964) (b. 1946)
  - Brereton C. Jones, 84, horse breeder and politician, lieutenant governor (1987–1991) and governor of Kentucky (1991–1995) (b. 1939)
  - Joe Matt, 60, cartoonist (Peepshow) (b. 1963)
  - Peter W. Mullin, 82, businessman (b. 1941)
- September 19
  - Billy Chemirmir, 50, Kenyan-born convicted murderer (b. 1972)
  - JoAnne A. Epps, 72, legal scholar, president of Temple University (2023) (b. 1951)
  - Stephen Gould, 61, heldentenor (b. 1961)
  - James F. Hoge Jr., 87, journalist and publisher (The Chicago Sun-Times, New York Daily News, Foreign Affairs) (b. 1935)
  - Buddy Teevens, 66, football coach (Dartmouth Big Green) (b. 1956)
- September 20
  - Katherine Anderson, 79, singer (The Marvelettes) (b. 1943/1944)
  - Dick Clark, 95, politician, member of the U.S. Senate (1973–1979) (b. 1928)
  - Elaine Devry, 93, actress (The Atomic Kid, China Doll, A Guide for the Married Man) (b. 1930)
  - Bobby Durnbaugh, 90, baseball player (Cincinnati Redlegs) (b. 1933)
  - Stephen Erickson, 83, philosopher (b. 1939/1940)
  - David Mack, 69, politician, member of the South Carolina House of Representatives (1997–2020) (b. 1953)
  - Lucy Morgan, 82, journalist (Tampa Bay Times), Pulitzer Prize winner (1985) (b. 1940)
  - Jack Sandlin, 72, politician, member of the Indiana Senate (since 2016) (b. 1950)
  - Phil Sellers, 69, player (Detroit Pistons, BV Amstelveen) (b. 1953)
  - Kent Stax, 61, drummer (Scream) (b. 1960/1961)
  - Hollis Watkins, 82, civil rights activist (b. 1941)
- September 21
  - Arlen Erdahl, 92, politician, member of the U.S. House of Representatives (1979–1983) (b. 1931)
  - Hubert Ginn, 76, football player (Miami Dolphins, Baltimore Colts, Oakland Raiders) (b. 1947)
  - Jeremy Silman, 69, chess player (b. 1954)
  - Robert W. Smith, 64, trumpeter and composer (b. 1958)
- September 22
  - Bob Glasgow, 81, politician, member of the Texas Senate (1980–1993) (b. 1942)
  - Evelyn Fox Keller, 87, physicist, author and feminist (b. 1936)
  - Pava LaPere, 26, businesswoman and entrepreneur (b. 1996/1997)
  - Mike Henderson, 70, singer-songwriter ("Broken Halos", "Starting Over") and musician (The SteelDrivers) (b. 1953)
  - Mark Manges, 67, football player (St. Louis Cardinals) (b. 1956)
  - Wallace B. Smith, 94, Community of Christ preacher, prophet-president (1978–1996) (b. 1929)
- September 23
  - Jim Courtney, 87, politician, member of the Montana House of Representatives (1977–1979) (b. 1936)
  - Nic Kerdiles, 29, ice hockey player (Anaheim Ducks) (b. 1994)<ref.Nic Kerdiles, 1994–2023</ref>
  - Terry Kirkman, 83, musician (The Association) and songwriter ("Cherish", "Everything That Touches You") (b. 1939)
  - Danny Morris, 74, baseball player (Minnesota Twins).
  - Paul Woodruff, 80, classicist and professor of philosophy (b. 1943)
- September 24
  - Viktor Belenko, 76, Russian-born fighter pilot (b. 1947)
  - Nashawn Breedlove, 46, actor (8 Mile) and rapper (b. 1976/1977)
  - Tim Foley, 75, football player (Miami Dolphins) (b. 1948)
  - Barry Olivier, 87, guitar teacher, creator of the Berkeley Folk Music Festival (b. 1935)
  - Chuck Romine, 87, politician, member of the West Virginia House of Delegates (1968–1974, 1998–2000, 2016–2018) (b. 1936)
- September 25
  - Burkey Belser, 76, graphic designer (nutrition facts label) (b. 1947)
  - Eugenio Calabi, 100, Italian-born mathematician (Calabi conjecture, Calabi–Yau manifold, Calabi flow) (b. 1923)
  - Gerry Shamray, 66, comic book artist (American Splendor) (b. 1957)
- September 26
  - Sandra Dorsey, 83, actress (Sleepaway Camp III: Teenage Wasteland, Gordy, Dumb and Dumber To) (b. 1939)
  - Teri Hope, 85, model and actress (Fun in Acapulco, Force of Impulse) (b. 1938)
  - Brooks Robinson, 86, Hall of Fame baseball player (Baltimore Orioles), World Series champion (1966, 1970) (b. 1937)
- September 27
  - Donna Becker, 91, baseball player (Kalamazoo Lassies) (b. 1932)
  - Dom Famularo, 70, drummer (b. 1953)
  - Bob Sheridan, 79, boxing and MMA commentator (b. 1944)
  - Ryuzo Yanagimachi, 95, Japanese-born embryologist (b. 1928)
- September 28
  - Glenn Bujnoch, 69, football player (Cincinnati Bengals, Tampa Bay Buccaneers) (b. 1953)
  - Viliami Moala, 30, football player (California Golden Bears, Baltimore Ravens) (b. 1993)
- September 29
  - Jon Fausty, 74, sound and recording engineer (b. 1949)
  - Dianne Feinstein, 90, politician, member of the U.S. Senate (since 1992), mayor of San Francisco (1978–1988) and president of the San Francisco Board of Supervisors (1978) (b. 1933)
  - Joyce Grable, 70, professional wrestler (NWA) (b. 1952)
  - Joseph E. Johnson, 90, academic, University of Tennessee system president (1991–1999) (b. 1933)
  - Kurt Schumacher, 70, football player (New Orleans Saints, Tampa Bay Buccaneers) (b. 1952)
  - Ed Young, 91, Chinese-born illustrator (b. 1931)
- September 30
  - Russell Batiste Jr., 57, drummer (The Meters, Vida Blue, Papa Grows Funk) (b. 1965)
  - Michael Flynn, 75, author (The Forest of Time, Fallen Angels) (b. 1947)
  - Russell Sherman, 93, classical pianist (b. 1930)
