= Deaths in August 2023 =

The following is a list of notable deaths in August 2023.

Entries for each day are listed alphabetically by surname. A typical entry lists information in the following sequence:

- Name, age, country of citizenship at birth, subsequent country of citizenship (if applicable), reason for notability, cause of death (if known), and reference.

== August 2023 ==
=== 1 ===
- Owe Adamson, 88, Swedish Olympic cyclist (1960).
- William Edward Bauer, 97, Canadian diplomat, ambassador to South Korea (1981–1984).
- Henri Konan Bédié, 89, Ivorian politician, president (1993–1999).
- Sir Phillip Bennett, 94, Australian general and vice-regal representative, governor of Tasmania (1987–1995).
- Tony Brien, 54, Irish footballer (Chesterfield, Hull City, Rotherham United).
- Franz Csandl, 74, Austrian Olympic boxer (1972).
- Vwaere Diaso, Nigerian doctor, elevator accident.
- Takaharu Doi, 90, Japanese lawyer and prosecutor, heart failure.
- Dương Văn Ngộ, 93, Vietnamese postal worker and letter writer.
- Richard Face, 80, Australian politician, New South Wales MP (1972–2003) and minister for gaming and racing (1995–2003).
- Geneviève de Fontenay, 90, French businesswoman, president of the Miss France committee (1981–2007), cardiac arrest.
- Yozo Fujita, 81, Japanese politician, mayor of Chikushino (2011–2023).
- Annabelle Gamson, 94, American dancer and choreographer.
- Heinz Golombeck, 74, German politician, MP (2009–2013).
- Fred W. Heard, 82, American politician, member of the Oregon House of Representatives (1969–1972) and Senate (1973–1983).
- Alexander Kolker, 90, Russian film composer (Private Life of Kuzyayev Valentin, Tomorrow, on April 3rd..., Three Men in a Boat).
- Howard Kunreuther, 84, American economist.
- David Le Batard, 50, American graphic artist (Norwegian Getaway).
- Tibor Lendvai, 83, Hungarian Olympic cyclist (1968).
- John Madigan, 76, Irish hurler (Charleville) and rugby union player (UL Bohemians, Munster).
- Dom Minasi, 80, American jazz guitarist, composer and music producer.
- Williamson Murray, 81, American historian.
- Sheila Oliver, 71, American politician, lieutenant governor of New Jersey (since 2018), member (2004–2018) and speaker (2010–2014) of the New Jersey General Assembly.
- Gérard Pommier, 81, French psychiatrist and psychoanalyst.
- Beth Porter, 81, American-British actress (The Great Gatsby, Yentl, Rock Follies).
- Alfred Roch, 98, Swiss Olympic cross-country skier (1952).
- Robbie Shepherd, 87, Scottish broadcaster (BBC Radio Scotland) and author.
- Mariana Sîrbu, 73–75, Romanian violinist (I Musici) and professor (University of Music and Theatre Leipzig).
- Brian Snowdon, 88, English footballer (Millwall, Portsmouth, Detroit Cougars).
- Ann Streissguth, 90, American psychologist.
- R. Stewart Wood, 89, American Episcopal clergyman, bishop of Michigan (1990–2000).

=== 2 ===
- Charles Ayo, 64, Nigerian academic administrator, vice chancellor of the Covenant University (2012–2016).
- Gerry Bermingham, 82, British politician, MP (1983–2001).
- Mark Birkinshaw, 68–69, British physicist.
- Svend Erik Bjerg, 78, Danish Olympic cyclist (1968, 1972).
- Paul Brodeur, 92, American journalist and writer.
- Shams Buneri, 77, Pakistani poet.
- Sherry Combs Johnson, 84, American Hall of Fame rodeo barrel racer, complications from COPD.
- Constance Darnowski, 88, American Olympic hurdler (1952, 1956).
- Élisabeth de Chimay, 97, French-born Belgian princess and writer.
- Ward Demuyt, 88, Belgian politician, MP (1991–1995).
- Laurence Deonna, 86, Swiss journalist.
- Nitin Chandrakant Desai, 57, Indian art director (Lagaan, 1942: A Love Story) and production designer (Such a Long Journey), suicide by hanging.
- Peter Dixon, 79, English rugby union player (Harlequins, national team, British Lions), brain cancer.
- Pnina Gary, 95, Israeli playwright and theatre director.
- John Goto, 74, British photographic artist.
- Ian Inkster, 74, English global historian and author.
- Tom Kempinski, 85, English playwright and actor (The Damned, Moon Zero Two, The McKenzie Break).
- Delano Lewis, 84, American diplomat, ambassador to South Africa (1999–2001).
- Ramón Lobo, 68, Spanish-Venezuelan journalist (El País), lung cancer.
- Antonio Nitto, 84, Italian Olympic speed skater (1960).
- Mark E. Noennig, 75, American politician, member of the Montana House of Representatives (1999–2006).
- Ignacy Sachs, 95, Polish economist.
- Vincent Speranza, 98, American paratrooper.
- Ignacas Stasys Uždavinys, 88, Lithuanian mathematician and politician, MP (1992–2000).
- Muhammad Naufal Zidan, 19, Indonesian student, stabbed.

=== 3 ===
- Abu al-Hussein al-Husseini al-Qurashi, Syrian militant, caliph of the Islamic State (since 2022). (death announced on this date)
- James Barnes, 61, American convicted murderer, execution by lethal injection.
- Sir Michael Boyd, 68, British theatre director, cancer.
- Irma Brenman Pick, 89, South African-born British psychologist and psychoanalyst, lung cancer.
- Ijaz Butt, 85, Pakistani cricket player (national team) and administrator, chairman of the Pakistan Cricket Board (2008–2011).
- James Cafiero, 94, American politician, member of the New Jersey General Assembly (1968–1972) and Senate (1972–1982, 1990–2004).
- Walter Charles, 78, American actor (Sweeney Todd: The Demon Barber of Fleet Street, Fletch Lives, Prancer), complications from frontotemporal dementia.
- Tom Costelloe, 94, Irish Gaelic footballer (Kerry).
- Carl Davis, 86, American-British composer (The French Lieutenant's Woman, Pride and Prejudice, Liverpool Oratorio) and conductor, brain hemorrhage.
- Sunil Dev, 75, Indian cricketer (Delhi).
- Richard M. Goody, 102, British-American atmospheric physicist.
- Charles Hardy, 57, American competitive eater, cancer.
- Mohamed Shalleh Abdul Latiff, 39, Singaporean drug smuggler, execution by hanging.
- Nick Lowden, 23, Australian footballer (Norwood), suicide.
- Namdeo Dhondo Mahanor, 80, Indian poet.
- Mark Margolis, 83, American actor (Breaking Bad, Scarface, Pi).
- Viktor Maslov, 93, Russian mathematical physicist (Maslov index).
- Bruno Mealli, 85, Italian road racing cyclist.
- Irina Miroshnichenko, 81, Russian actress (Walking the Streets of Moscow, Mission in Kabul, Could One Imagine?).
- Bram Moolenaar, 61–62, Dutch computer programmer (Vim).
- Bob Murdoch, 76, Canadian ice hockey player (Los Angeles Kings, Montreal Canadiens) and coach (Winnipeg Jets).
- Gilles Perrault, 92, French writer and journalist.
- Elvira Petrozzi, 86, Italian Roman Catholic nun.
- W. A. Shishak, 82, Indian jurist, chief justice of Chhattisgarh (2000–2002) and Himachal Pradesh (2002–2003) high courts.
- Zygmunt Szweykowski, 94, Polish academic and musicologist.
- Melvin George Talbert, 89, American Methodist bishop.
- Nechama Tec, 92, Polish-American sociologist and writer.
- Franklin G. Torr, 93, American politician, member of the New Hampshire House of Representatives (1980–1986, 1992–2000) and New Hampshire Senate (1986–1992).
- Adrienne Vaughan, 45, American publishing house executive, president of Bloomsbury USA (since 2021), boat collision.

=== 4 ===
- Michele Achilli, 92, Italian politician, deputy (1967–1987), senator (1987–1992).
- Luis Alarcón, 93, Chilean actor (Jackal of Nahueltoro, Julio comienza en julio, Three Sad Tigers).
- Boniface Alexandre, 87, Haitian politician, provisional president (2004–2006).
- Jessica Cash, 84, British soprano and voice coach.
- Andreas Däscher, 96, Swiss four-time Olympic ski jumper.
- Tudor Deliu, 67, Moldovan politician, deputy (2009–2019).
- Walter Dobrogosz, 89, American microbiologist.
- Jango Edwards, 73, American clown and comedian.
- Ray Enright, 94, Canadian football player (Edmonton Eskimos, BC Lions).
- Dalia Fadila, 51, Israeli educationist, drowned.
- John Gosling, 75, English keyboardist (The Kinks).
- Daniel W. Herzog, 82, American Episcopal clergyman, bishop of Albany (1998–2007), neurosarcoidosis.
- Panna Kaiser, 73, Bangladeshi politician, MP (1996–2001).
- Rhoda Karpatkin, 93, American lawyer and consumers rights activist, brain cancer.
- Arthur Mauro, 96, Canadian lawyer and businessman.
- Mikhail Nikolayev, 85, Russian politician, president of the Sakha Republic (1991–2002), senator (2002–2010).
- Tane Norton, 81, New Zealand rugby union player (Canterbury, New Zealand Māori, national team).
- Colin O'Daly, 70, Irish chef.
- Charles Ogletree, 70, American attorney and law professor.
- Edrissa Sanneh, 72, Gambian-born Italian television personality and football journalist, complications from vasculitis.
- Serhii Slabenko, 57, Ukrainian politician, MP (2002–2006).
- Colin Stannard, 99, English Anglican clergyman.
- N. Vittal, 85, Indian civil servant.
- Eberhard Werner, 57, German anthropologist.
- Carmen Xtravaganza, 62, Spanish-born American model and singer, depicted in Paris is Burning, lung cancer.
- Achyut Yagnik, 77, Indian journalist, academic, and activist, cardiac arrest.

=== 5 ===
- Walter Bortz II, 93, American physician and author.
- Hélène Carrère d'Encausse, 94, French historian and politician, MEP (1994–1999) and secretary of the Académie Française (since 1999).
- Nermin Crnkić, 30, Bosnian-American footballer (Tuzla City, Sarajevo, Jablonec), heart attack.
- Philippe Curval, 93, French journalist and science fiction writer.
- Sir Timothy Daunt, 87, British diplomat, lieutenant governor of the Isle of Man (1995–2000), complications from cerebral vasculitis.
- Julio Ferreyra, 81, Argentine politician, deputy (since 2019).
- Gan Teik Chai, 40, Malaysian badminton player, heart attack.
- Daniel Gouffier, 85, French Olympic sailor.
- Shreyas Hareesh, 13, Indian motorcycle racer, race crash.
- Bambi Harper, 82, Filipino cultural writer, administrator of Intramuros (2008–2010).
- Tristan Honsinger, 73, American cellist.
- Leonid Kozik, 75, Belarusian trade unionist, president of the FTUB (2002–2014).
- Slim Lehart, 88, American country singer.
- James J. Lindsay, 90, American general.
- Giuseppe Montanari, 86, Italian comic artist (Dylan Dog).
- Toshio Moriuchi, 86, Japanese author, pneumonia.
- Dennis M. Nagy, 80, American intelligence analyst.
- Nami Sano, 36, Japanese manga artist (Haven't You Heard? I'm Sakamoto), cancer.
- Arthur Schmidt, 86, American film editor (Back to the Future, Who Framed Roger Rabbit, Forrest Gump), Oscar winner (1988, 1994).
- Helmut Siber, 81, Austrian footballer (Kickers Offenbach, WSG Wattens, national team).
- Herbert J. Siegel, 95, American businessman.
- Elton Veals, 62, American football player (Pittsburgh Steelers).

=== 6 ===
- Ahmed Anarbayev, 75, Kyrgyz Olympic swimmer (1968).
- Dominic Devine, 66, Scottish serial rapist.
- Gaddar, 74, Indian poet and communist militant, lung and urinary infection.
- Ignazio Marcello Gallo, 99, Italian jurist and politician, senator (1983–1992).
- Sir Patrick Garland, 94, English judge, judge of the High Court (1985–2002).
- Marcel Gervais, 91, Canadian Roman Catholic prelate, auxiliary bishop of London (1980–1985), bishop of Sault Ste. Marie (1985–1989) and archbishop of Ottawa (1989–2007).
- Gilles Gilbert, 74, Canadian ice hockey player (Minnesota North Stars, Boston Bruins, Detroit Red Wings).
- Yevgeny Golubovsky, 86, Ukrainian journalist and culturologist.
- Harold Hyman, 99, American historian.
- Roger Kramer, 84, American-born Canadian football player (Calgary Stampeders, Ottawa Rough Riders, Montreal Alouettes).
- David LaFlamme, 82, American singer and violinist (It's a Beautiful Day).
- Jack Mandelbaum, 96, Polish-American Holocaust survivor.
- Veniamin Mandrykin, 41, Russian footballer (CSKA Moscow, national team), complications from a heart attack.
- Harvey Meyerhoff, 96, American businessman.
- Allen Parducci, 97, American psychologist.
- Roger Pirenne, 88, Belgian Roman Catholic prelate, bishop of Batouri (1994–1999) and archbishop of Bertoua (1999–2009).
- Mohammad Rafiq, 79, Bangladeshi poet.
- Lee Richard, 74, American baseball player (Chicago White Sox, St. Louis Cardinals).
- Kristján Þorvaldsson, 61, Icelandic journalist.
- Ingrid Schmidt, 78, German swimmer, Olympic bronze medallist (1960).
- Louis Tillett, 64, Australian singer and musician.
- Johannes Tomana, 55, Zimbabwean lawyer and diplomat, attorney-general (2008–2017).
- Elizabeth Webby, 81, Australian literary critic.
- Ken Yasuda, 52, Japanese-born American bodybuilder and actor.

=== 7 ===
- Zenon Andrusyshyn, 76, German-born Canadian football player (Toronto Argonauts, Kansas City Chiefs, Tampa Bay Bandits).
- Aracy Balabanian, 83, Brazilian actress (Rainha da Sucata, A Próxima Vítima, Sai de Baixo).
- Gillian Bibby, 77, New Zealand composer, pianist, and music teacher.
- Jean-Louis Cohen, 74, French architect and architectural historian.
- Vera Dedanwala, 80, German politician, member of the Landtag of North Rhine-Westphalia (1990–2005).
- DJ Casper, 58, American DJ and songwriter ("Cha Cha Slide"), kidney and liver cancer.
- Nidhi Eoseewong, 83, Thai historian, lung cancer.
- Roland Freeman, 87, American photographer.
- William Friedkin, 87, American film director (The French Connection, The Exorcist, To Live and Die in L.A.), Oscar winner (1971), heart failure and pneumonia.
- Mirko Giansanti, 46, Italian motorcycle road racer.
- Robert Giles, 90, American newspaper editor and publisher (The Detroit News), metastatic melanoma.
- Kostis Gimossoulis, 63, Greek poet and novelist.
- Joy Jobbins, 95, Australian writer and marketing executive.
- Märta Johansson, 88, Swedish politician, MP (1994–2002).
- Michalis Katsouris, 29, Greek man, stabbed.
- Erkin Koray, 82, Turkish singer-songwriter and guitarist.
- Toussaint McCall, 89, American R&B singer.
- Ambareesh Murty, 51, Indian entrepreneur and business executive (Pepperfry), cardiac arrest.
- Taiwo Odukoya, 67, Nigerian Pentecostal pastor.
- Jim Price, 81, American baseball player and sportscaster (Detroit Tigers), World Series champion (1968).
- Margit Saad, 94, German actress (Three Birch Trees on the Heath, The Criminal, The Magnificent Two).
- Bohdan Seniuk, 22, Ukrainian soldier.
- Mahbanoo Tata, 81, Indian-born Iranian statistician.
- Gérard Toulouse, 83, French theoretical physicist.
- Mario Tronti, 92, Italian philosopher and politician, senator (1992–1994, 2013–2018).
- Aimo Vartiainen, 96, Finnish Olympic alpine skier (1948).
- Peter Vaughan-Clarke, 66, British actor (The Tomorrow People).
- Nobel Vega, 92, Cuban actor and children's television presenter.
- Leigh Verstraete, 61, Canadian ice hockey player (Toronto Maple Leafs).
- Joggie Viljoen, 78, South African rugby union player (Griquas, Eastern Province Elephants, national team).
- Leonid Volodarskiy, 73, Russian translator, writer and radio presenter.
- John David Maitland Wright, 81, British mathematician.

=== 8 ===
- Ask Victor More, 4, Japanese Thoroughbred racehorse, winner of the Kikuka-shō (2022), heat stroke.
- Federico Bahamontes, 95, Spanish road racing cyclist, Tour de France winner (1959).
- Yuliya Borisova, 98, Russian actress (The Ambassador of the Soviet Union, The Idiot).
- John Bradbury, 3rd Baron Bradbury, 83, British peer, member of the House of Lords (1994–1999).
- Rogelio Canches, 69, Peruvian politician, deputy (2011–2016).
- Julio Capote, 90, Cuban actor (The White Rose, Cara sucia, Gata Salvaje).
- Bryan Cassidy, 89, British politician, MEP (1984–1999).
- Dorothy Casterline, 96, American linguist.
- Martin Diño, 66, Filipino politician, chairman and administrator of the Subic Bay Metropolitan Authority (2016–2017), lung cancer.
- Goodall Gondwe, 86, Malawian economist, minister of finance (2004–2009, 2014–2019).
- Johnny Hardwick, 64, American voice actor and television writer (King of the Hill), Emmy winner (1999).
- Roy Harris, 90, American boxer and lawyer.
- Dušan Kaprálik, 75, Slovak actor (The Teacher, Old-Timers).
- Gaston Ouassénan Koné, 84, Ivorian general and politician, minister of internal security (1976–1986) and security (1993–1995).
- Ian G. Macdonald, 94, British mathematician.
- Luis Alberto Parra Mora, 79, Colombian Roman Catholic prelate, bishop of Mocoa–Sibundoy (2003–2014).
- Richard Murphy, 91, American Olympic rower.
- Daniel Naatehn, Liberian politician, senator (2005–2011, since 2014).
- Jamie Reid, 76, British visual artist (Sex Pistols) and anarchist.
- Sixto Rodriguez, 81, American singer-songwriter ("Sugar Man"), subject of Searching for Sugar Man.
- Siddique, 69, Indian film director (Ramji Rao Speaking, Big Brother), screenwriter (Pappan Priyappetta Pappan), and actor, heart attack.
- Shelley Smith, 70, American model and actress (The Associates), cardiac arrest.
- Rosemary Squires, 94, English singer.
- Sir Simon Tuckey, 81, British barrister and judge.
- Vera Vasilyeva, 97, Russian actress (Ballad of Siberia, Bride with a Dowry, Adventures of a Dentist).

=== 9 ===
- Dionys Baeriswyl, 79, Swiss theoretical physicist, cancer.
- Polali Jayarama Bhat, 71, Indian banker, CEO of Karnataka Bank (2009–2015).
- María Cangá, 60, Ecuadorian Olympic judoka (1992).
- John Coddington, 85, English footballer (Huddersfield Town, Blackburn Rovers, Stockport County).
- Sean Dawkins, 52, American football player (Indianapolis Colts, New Orleans Saints, Seattle Seahawks).
- Ita Ever, 92, Estonian actress (Secret of the Blackbirds, Vana daami visiit).
- Aderbal Freire Filho, 82, Brazilian actor (Dupla Identidade), theatrical director and television presenter.
- Peppino Gagliardi, 83, Italian singer.
- Joseph Ganda, 91, Sierra Leonean Roman Catholic prelate, bishop of Kenema (1970–1980) and archbishop of Freetown (1980–2007).
- Miha Halzer, 38, Slovenian cross-country eliminator cyclist.
- Doreen Mantle, 97, South African-born British actress (One Foot in the Grave, Jam & Jerusalem, Yentl).
- Diana Marcum, 60, American author, glioblastoma.
- Brice Marden, 84, American painter.
- Aleksandar Matanović, 93, Serbian chess grandmaster, co-founder of Chess Informant.
- Art McRory, Irish Gaelic football manager (Tyrone).
- Hari Narke, 60, Indian scholar, heart attack.
- Harrij Notenboom, 96, Dutch politician, MP (1963–1979) and MEP (1971–1984).
- Craig DeLeeuw Robertson, 75, American firearms collector, shot.
- Robbie Robertson, 80, Canadian Hall of Fame musician (The Band), songwriter ("The Weight") and film composer (The Color of Money), prostate cancer.
- Daya Sahabandu, 83, Sri Lankan cricketer (Nomads, national team), pneumonia.
- Hugh Segal, 72, Canadian academic and politician, senator (2005–2014) and chief of staff to the prime minister (1992–1993).
- Philip Sherman, 67, American rabbi and mohel, pancreatic cancer.
- Robert Swan, 78, American actor (Hoosiers, Natural Born Killers, Backdraft), liver cancer.
- Véronique Trillet-Lenoir, 66, French oncologist and politician, MEP (since 2019).
- Fernando Villavicencio, 59, Ecuadorian journalist and politician, deputy (2021–2023) and 2023 presidential candidate, shot.
- Brian Walsh, 72, Australian footballer (Carlton, Essendon).
- Volodar Zvyozdkin, 96, Soviet sprint canoer.

=== 10 ===
- Jeran Akers, 75-76, American politician, Mayor of Plano, Texas (2000-2002).
- Robert Arevalo, 85, Filipino actor (The Moises Padilla Story, Only the Brave Know Hell, Fuchsia), complications from Parkinson's disease.
- Patricia Bragg, 94, American businesswoman, author, and health consultant.
- Cesare Cipollini, 64, Italian Olympic cyclist (1976).
- Henry Dickerson, 71, American basketball player (Detroit Pistons, Atlanta Hawks) and coach (Chattanooga Mocs).
- Mark Gilliland, 74, Canadian lawn bowler, esophageal cancer.
- Jalila Hafsia, 95, Tunisian writer.
- José Vicente Huertas Vargas, 83, Colombian Roman Catholic prelate, bishop of Garagoa (2000–2017).
- Alec Jackson, 86, English footballer (West Bromwich Albion, Birmingham City, Walsall).
- Craig Kletzing, 65, American plasma physicist.
- Antonella Lualdi, 92, Italian actress (Miracle in Viggiù, Wild Love, Un caso di coscienza) and singer.
- Vlad Marcoci, 55, Romanian politician, deputy (2012–2016), cardiac arrest.
- Michela Murgia, 51, Italian novelist, playwright and blogger, renal cell carcinoma.
- Daniel Nushiro, 84, Japanese Orthodox clergyman, primate of the Orthodox Church in Japan (since 2000).
- Luisa Teresa Pacheco, 79, Venezuelan politician, governor of Táchira state (1984–1989).
- Rosemary S. Pooler, 85, American jurist, judge of the U.S. District Court for Northern New York (1994–1998) and the U.S. Court of Appeals for the Second Circuit (since 1998).
- Nibedita Pradhan, 60, Indian politician, Odisha MLA.
- Klaus Rost, 83, German wrestler, Olympic silver medallist (1964).
- Mike Santiago, 67, American football coach (Stephen F. Austin Lumberjacks, Incarnate Word Cardinals), cancer.
- Abdullatif Al-Sayed, 50–51, Yemeni military officer, roadside blast.
- Aleksandr Viktorenko, 76, Russian cosmonaut (Soyuz TM-3, Soyuz TM-8, Soyuz TM-14).
- Stan Waterman, 100, American cinematographer (The Deep) and film producer (Blue Water, White Death).
- Roger G. Wells, 83, American politician, member of the New Hampshire House of Representatives (2004–2010).
- Vincentius Sutikno Wisaksono, 69, Indonesian Roman Catholic prelate, bishop of Surabaya (since 2007).

=== 11 ===
- Royce Adams, 84, American politician.
- Mike Ahern, 81, Australian politician, premier of Queensland (1987–1989), cancer.
- Chris Axworthy, 76, English-born Canadian politician, MP (1988–1999).
- John Barrett, 94, Australian footballer (Footscray, Fitzroy).
- Sliman Bensmaia, 49, French neuroscientist.
- Dick Biddle, 75, American college football player (Duke, Youngstown Hardhats) and coach.
- Barbara Borchardt, 67, German politician, member of the Landtag of Mecklenburg-Vorpommern (1998–2002, 2004–2016).
- Alex Cole, 58, American baseball player (Pittsburgh Pirates, Cleveland Indians, Minnesota Twins).
- Luigi Farci, 84, Italian Olympic field hockey player (1960).
- John Fielder, 73, American photographer, cancer.
- Angela Flowers, 90, British gallerist, founder of the Flowers Gallery.
- Simone Gilges, 50, German artist.
- Jerome Hauer, 71, American civil servant, director of the New York City Emergency Management (1996–2000), prostate cancer.
- Julian Haviland, 93, British journalist, political editor of ITN (1975–1981) and The Times (1981–1986).
- Tom Jones, 95, American lyricist (The Fantasticks, 110 in the Shade, I Do! I Do!), cancer.
- Darren Kent, 39, English actor (Mirrors, Dungeons & Dragons: Honor Among Thieves, Blood Drive).
- Andy Larkin, 76, American Olympic rower (1968).
- Kjell Lauri, 67, Swedish orienteer, world champion (1979).
- Florence Malgoire, 63, French classical violinist, pedagogue and conductor.
- Nikolay Marincheshki, 65, Bulgarian Olympic fencer (1980, 1988).
- Judith Ann McKenzie, 81, American biogeochemist.
- Shane McNally, 69, Australian rugby league player (Brisbane Tigers, Queensland) and coach (Wakefield Trinity).
- Lizeta Nikolaou, 74, Greek singer, fall.
- Julian Ogilvie Thompson, 89, South African businessman (De Beers, Anglo American).
- Alexandru Penciu, 90, Romanian rugby union player (Steaua București, Rugby Rovigo, national team).
- Ron S. Peno, 68, Australian singer-songwriter (Died Pretty), cancer.
- Giora Romm, 78, Israeli Air Force officer, cancer.
- Kourosh Safavi, 67, Iranian linguist.
- Mere Samisoni, 85, Fijian entrepreneur and politician, MP (2018).
- Konrad Seitz, 89, German academic and diplomat, ambassador to India (1987–1990), Italy (1992–1995), and China (1995–1999).
- Bikash Sinha, 78, Indian nuclear physicist, director of the Saha Institute of Nuclear Physics and the Variable Energy Cyclotron Centre (2005–2009).
- Gus Solomons Jr., 84, American dancer and choreographer, heart failure.
- Fred Stewart, 89, Canadian politician, Alberta MLA (1986–1993).
- Shoji Tabuchi, 79, Japanese-American fiddler, cancer.
- Gregg Tafralis, 65, American Olympic shot putter (1988).
- Dick Tomanek, 92, American baseball player (Cleveland Indians, Kansas City Athletics).
- Kenneth White, 87, Scottish poet, academic and writer.

=== 12 ===
- Michael Auditor, 80, German politician, member of the Landtag of Lower Saxony (1978–1994).
- Nicholas Byron Cavadias, 94, Indian-born Greek-Canadian engineer and aeronautic administrator.
- Helen Don-Duncan, 42, English Olympic swimmer (2000).
- Sándor Eckschmiedt, 84, Hungarian Olympic athlete (1964, 1968, 1972).
- Vilayil Faseela, 63, Indian singer.
- Atanas Golomeev, 76, Bulgarian basketball player (BC CSKA, Academic Sofia, Levski) and coach.
- Andrzej Kaznowski, 87, Polish politician, mayor of Gdansk (1973–1977).
- Salaudeen Latinwo, 80, Nigerian Air Force officer, governor of Kwara State (1984–1985).
- William Laurino, 82, American politician.
- Berit Lindholm, 88, Swedish soprano (Royal Swedish Opera, Bayreuth Festival).
- Paollo Madeira, 27, Brazilian-born Portuguese footballer (Hong Linh Ha Tinh FC, Hoang Anh Gia Lai FC), traffic collision.
- Mary-Louise McLaws, 70, Australian epidemiologist and academic, brain cancer.
- Djoko Pekik, 86, Indonesian painter.
- Jacques Rougerie, 78, French rugby union player (AS Montferrand, national team).
- Allan Smith, 94, Sri Lankan Olympic diver (1952).
- Petr Sommer, 73, Czech historian and archaeologist.
- Henk Tiesinga, 73–74, Dutch politician, senator (2009–2011).
- Yevgeny Yozhikov-Babakhanov, 81, Kazakh politician, first deputy prime minister (1991–1992).

=== 13 ===
- Teresita Abundo, 74, Philippine educator and athlete.
- Clarence Avant, 92, American Hall of Fame music executive and film producer (Save the Children, Jason's Lyric), founder of Sussex Records.
- Patricia Bredin, 88, English actress (Left Right and Centre, The Treasure of Monte Cristo) and singer (Eurovision Song Contest 1957).
- Nelson Broms, 104, American business executive, investor and philanthropist.
- José Murilo de Carvalho, 83, Brazilian historian, member of the Brazilian Academy of Letters, COVID-19.
- Joe Caven, 86, Scottish footballer (Airdrieonians, Greenock Morton, Germiston Callies).
- Alex Collins, 28, American football player (Seattle Seahawks, Baltimore Ravens, Memphis Showboats), traffic collision.
- Thierry Despont, 75, French architect and interior designer.
- Norman Drew, 91, Northern Irish golfer.
- Edel Hætta Eriksen, 101, Norwegian politician, member of the Saami Council (1956–1963, 1974–1977).
- Wolfgang Kasper, 84, German-born Australian economist and linguist, stroke.
- Danny Lacuna, 85, Filipino politician, vice mayor of Manila (1988–1992, 1998–2007).
- Rachel Laurin, 62, Canadian organist, composer and music educator.
- Peter Magadini, 81, American drummer and author (The Musician's Guide to Polyrhythms).
- Magoo, 50, American rapper (Timbaland & Magoo) and songwriter ("Up Jumps da Boogie").
- Theo Meijer, 76, Dutch politician, MP (1996–2003).
- Constantino Méndez, 72, Spanish politician, secretary of state for defence (2008–2011) and deputy (1993–1996).
- Randy Minniear, 79, American football player (New York Giants, Cleveland Browns).
- M. R. S. Rao, 75, Indian biologist, president of JNCASR (2003–2013), cardiac arrest.
- Bill Schlesinger, 81, American baseball player (Boston Red Sox).
- John L. Scott Jr., 69, American politician, member of the South Carolina House of Representatives (1991–2009) and Senate (since 2009).
- James E. Womack, 82, American biologist.

=== 14 ===
- Francesco Alberoni, 93, Italian journalist (Corriere della Sera) and sociologist, chairman of RAI (2004–2005), kidney disease.
- Rodion Amirov, 21, Russian ice hockey player (Salavat Yulaev Ufa), brain cancer.
- Karen Bakker, 51, Canadian academic and author.
- James Bartleman, 83, Canadian diplomat, lieutenant governor of Ontario (2002–2007), ambassador to the European Union (2000–2002) and permanent representative to NATO (1990–1994).
- Bobby Baun, 86, Canadian ice hockey player (Toronto Maple Leafs, Detroit Red Wings, Oakland Seals).
- John L. Carroll, 79, American judge and academic administrator, dean of the Cumberland School of Law (2001–2014).
- Gérard Diffloth, 84, French linguist.
- Boris Dubrovskiy, 83, Russian rower, Olympic champion (1964).
- Matyelok Gibbs, 91, British actress (Harry Potter and the Deathly Hallows – Part 1, Babel) and artistic director (Unicorn Theatre).
- Adriana Giuffrè, 84, Italian actress.
- Rich Landrum, 77, American television broadcaster and professional wrestling announcer (JCP).
- Elías López Sobá, 96, Puerto Rican classical pianist.
- David Lupton, 75, English cricketer (Cumberland).
- Sultan Mahmud, 79, Bangladeshi military officer, chief of air staff (1981–1987).
- Harris Mann, 85, British car designer.
- Michael Maynard, 86, British Olympic sailor (1968).
- Louis Mexandeau, 92, French politician, minister of posts (1981–1986) and three-time deputy.
- Andrei Nikolayev, 85, Russian clown, artistic director and teacher.
- Petch Osathanugrah, 68, Thai businessman (Osotspa) and singer-songwriter, president of Bangkok University, heart failure.
- Delwar Hossain Sayeedi, 83, Bangladeshi Islamic scholar, politician, and convicted war criminal, MP (1996–2006).
- Wolfram Setz, 82, German historian.
- Neil Wilson, 93, New Zealand runner.
- Joseph A. Wolf, 86, American mathematician.
- László Zarándi, 94, Hungarian sprinter, Olympic bronze medalist (1952).
- Vladimir A. Zorich, 85, Russian mathematician.

=== 15 ===
- Gary Barnes, 83, American football player (Green Bay Packers, Dallas Cowboys, Chicago Bears), complications from Parkinson's disease.
- Klaus Bugdahl, 88, German road and track cyclist. (death announced on this date)
- Ursula Cantieni, 75, Swiss-German actress (Die Fallers – Die SWR Schwarzwaldserie).
- Will Dockery Carpenter, 93, American scientist and philanthropist.
- Ada Deer, 88, American civil servant, assistant secretary of the interior for Indian affairs (1993–1997).
- John Elsom, 84, English football executive, chairman of Leicester City (1998–2002).
- Bruno Ferrero, 89, French footballer (FC Nancy, US Rumelange, national team).
- Léa Garcia, 90, Brazilian actress (Black Orpheus, Os Bandeirantes, The Greatest Love of All).
- Mohammed Habib, 74, Indian footballer (East Bengal, Mohun Bagan, national team), complications from Parkinson's disease and dementia.
- Roy Harper, 94, Australian footballer (Footscray).
- Jeff Hilton, 51, Australian footballer (Melbourne, St Kilda).
- Hans Kratzert, 83, German screenwriter and film director.
- Miroslav Krišan, 55, Serbian politician, deputy (1994–1997) and mayor of Kovačica (2000–2015), heart attack.
- Gérard Leclerc, 71, French journalist, airplane crash.
- Liam MacDaid, 78, Irish Roman Catholic prelate, bishop of Clogher (2010–2016).
- James Charles Nakhwanga Osogo, 90, Kenyan politician, MP (1963–1980), minister of information (1966–1969) and agriculture (1979), multiple organ failure.
- Arnold Östman, 83, Swedish conductor.
- Bindeshwar Pathak, 80, Indian sociologist, founder of Sulabh International, cardiac arrest.
- Marc Tay, 63, Singaporean swimmer and ophthalmologist.
- Vladimir Timoshinin, 53, Russian Olympic diver (1988, 1996).
- Francisc Tobă, 70, Romanian military officer and politician, deputy (1992–1996, since 2021).
- Hans Hermann Weyer, 85, German title dealer.
- Yoon Ki-jung, 91, South Korean economist.

=== 16 ===
- Pierre Alféri, 60, French novelist, poet, and essayist.
- V. S. R. Arunachalam, 87, Indian engineer, founder of CSTEP.
- R.C. Bales, 93, American bull rider.
- Bikiran Prasad Barua, 79, Bangladeshi physicist, cardiac arrest.
- Howard S. Becker, 95, American sociologist.
- Beriz Belkić, 76, Bosnian politician, chairman (2002) and member (2001–2002) of the presidency, prime minister of Sarajevo Canton (1998–2001), stroke.
- Abwan Jama Kadiye, 73, Somali poet, shelling.
- Stelios Koiliaris, 71–72, Cypriot financial manager and politician, minister of commerce and industry (1993–1994) and commerce, industry, and tourism (1994–1995).
- Ernst Kozlicek, 92, Austrian footballer (SK Admira Vienna, LASK, national team).
- Edgar Marín, 80, Costa Rican footballer (Saprissa, Oakland Clippers, national team).
- Mariano Moreno García, 84, Spanish Roman Catholic prelate, bishop of Cafayate (2008–2014).
- Johaar Mosaval, 95, South African ballet dancer, complications from osteoarthritis.
- Jerry Moss, 88, American Hall of Fame recording executive, co-founder of A&M Records.
- Haruki Noguchi, 22, Japanese motorcycle racer, injuries sustained in motorcycle crash.
- Sir Michael Parkinson, 88, English journalist (Manchester Guardian, Daily Express) and broadcaster (Parkinson).
- Aleksei Petrov, 61, Bulgarian businessman, shot.
- Carl Richardson, 102, American college football coach (Eastern New Mexico University).
- Renata Scotto, 89, Italian operatic soprano (La Scala, Metropolitan Opera).
- Tony White, 84, Barbadian cricketer (national team, West Indies).
- Ronald Whittam, 98, British physiologist.
- Ernst Wroldsen, 78, Norwegian politician, MP (1981–1993).
- Gennady Zhidko, 57, Russian colonel general, commander of the Eastern Military District (2018–2021).

=== 17 ===
- Garry Adey, 78, English rugby union player (Leicester Tigers, national team).
- Walter Aipolani, 68, American singer.
- Hugo Álamos Vásquez, 90, Chilean agronomic engineer and politician, deputy (1969–1973, 1990–1994).
- Art Collector, 6, American Thoroughbred racehorse, winner of the Blue Grass Stakes (2020) and Pegasus World Cup (2023), euthanized.
- Mãe Bernadete, 72, Brazilian quilombola, shot.
- Karol J. Bobko, 85, American astronaut (STS-6, STS-51-D, STS-51-J).
- Miroslav Bošković, 76, Serbian footballer (Hajduk Split, Angers, national team).
- Paul Bush, 67, British experimental film director and animator, traffic collision.
- John Devitt, 86, Australian swimmer, Olympic champion (1956, 1960).
- Robert Ekelund, 82, American economist, complications from Parkinson's disease and cancer.
- Bobby Eli, 77, American guitarist (MFSB), songwriter ("Love Won't Let Me Wait"), and record producer.
- Angie Ferro, 86, Filipino actress (Patayin Mo Sa Sindak Si Barbara, Evolution of a Filipino Family, Lola Igna).
- Wayne Gilbert, 76, American painter, cancer.
- Rose Gregorio, 97, American actress (Eyes of Laura Mars, Good Time, ER), pneumonia.
- Olivier Guillot, 91, French academic and historian.
- Johari Harun, 53, Malaysian politician, Pahang MLA (since 2022), plane crash.
- Tom Husband, 87, Scottish engineer and academic administrator, vice-chancellor of the University of Salford (1990–1997).
- Kunwar Naveed Jamil, 59, Pakistani politician, MNA (2015–2018), Sindh MPA (2018–2023) and mayor of Hyderabad (2005–2010), complications from brain hemorrhage.
- Rick Jeanneret, 81, Canadian sportscaster (Buffalo Sabres), multiple organ failure.
- Gabriella Kotsis, 95, Hungarian Olympic volleyball coach (1972, 1976, 1980).
- Marga T, 79, Indonesian author.
- Wallace H. Nutting, 95, American general.
- OJ Blaq, 40, Ghanaian rapper and actor.
- David Ostrosky, 66, Mexican actor (Teresa, Marisol, Por siempre mi amor).
- Gudrun Pflüger, 50, Austrian mountain runner, four-time world champion, cancer.
- Brynley F. Roberts, 92, Welsh scholar and critic.
- David J. Russell, 92, Canadian politician, deputy premier of Alberta (1985–1989).
- Guillermo Timoner, 97, Spanish racing cyclist, six-time UCI Motor-paced world champion.
- Betty Tyson, 75, American woman wrongly convicted of murder.
- Marko Vešović, 78, Bosnian-Montenegrin writer.
- William D. Weeks, 97, American politician, member of the Massachusetts Senate (1964–1970).
- Gary Young, 70, American drummer (Pavement).

=== 18 ===
- Balltze, 12, Hong Kong Shiba Inu dog and Internet meme, leukemia.
- James L. Buckley, 100, American jurist and politician, U.S. senator (1971–1977), counselor of the Department of State (1982) and judge of the U.S. Court of Appeals for the D.C. Circuit (since 1985), complications from a fall.
- Laura Ann Carleton, 66, American clothing store owner, shot.
- Cave Rock, 3, American Thoroughbred racehorse, winner of the Del Mar Futurity (2022) and American Pharoah Stakes (2022), complications from laminitis.
- Roberto Colaninno, 80, Italian business executive (Piaggio).
- David Counts, 87, American politician, member of the Texas House of Representatives (1988–2003).
- Allan Crossley, 70–71, British strongman competitor, Britain's Strongest Man (1984). (death announced on this date)
- Nancy Frangione, 70, American actress (Another World).
- Jean-Louis Georgelin, 74, French Army general, chief of the defence staff (2006–2010), led Notre-Dame de Paris reconstruction (since 2019), hiking accident.
- Terry Giddy, 73, Australian athlete, Paralympic champion (1984).
- Govy, 42, French visual artist and disability rights activist.
- Fernando Herrero Acosta, 70, Costa Rican economist and politician, minister of finance (1994–1996, 2010–2012), stroke.
- Ray Hildebrand, 82, American singer (Paul & Paula) and songwriter ("Hey Paula", "Young Lovers").
- Tadaaki Kuwayama, 91, Japanese painter.
- Musa Lawan, 79, Nigerian politician and chieftain.
- Sarah Lawson, 95, British actress (The Night Won't Talk, Three Steps in the Dark, Night of the Big Heat), cancer.
- Lolita, c. 57, American orca, kidney failure.
- Richard Luft, 85, American politician, member of the Illinois House of Representatives (1975–1979) and Senate (1983–1993).
- Kristin Moe, 68, Norwegian politician, talk show host and civil servant, leader of the Norwegian Consumer Council (1984–1993).
- Chico Novarro, 89, Argentine singer-songwriter.
- Phạm Quốc Thuần, 96, Vietnamese army general.
- Al Quie, 99, American politician, governor of Minnesota (1979–1983), member of the Minnesota Senate (1955–1958) and U.S. House of Representatives (1958–1979).
- Jørn Riel, 92, Danish writer.
- Paschal Salisbury, 95, American Dominican priest.
- Nicolas Trifon, 74, Romanian-born French academic, editor and linguist.
- Kyle Turner, 31, Australian rugby league player (South Sydney Rabbitohs).
- Kenneth M. Watson, 101, American theoretical physicist and physical oceanographer.
- Mirfatyh Zakiev, 95, Russian Turkologist.

=== 19 ===
- Maxie Baughan, 85, American Hall of Fame football player (Philadelphia Eagles, Los Angeles Rams) and coach (Cornell Big Red).
- James Burke, 97, American space engineer.
- Gloria Coates, 89, American composer, pancreatic cancer.
- Carl Crennel, 74, American football player (Pittsburgh Steelers, Montreal Alouettes, Hamilton Tiger-Cats).
- Michael Dilley, 84, English cricketer (Northamptonshire).
- Rodney Elton, 2nd Baron Elton, 93, British politician, member of the House of Lords (1973–2020).
- Gianni Ferlenghi, 92, Italian racing cyclist.
- Joanna Gail, 37, American-Greek Olympic softball player (2004), bacterial meningitis.
- Dan Green, 70, American comic book artist (Spider-Man, Wolverine, Doctor Strange).
- Hans Rudolf Gysin, 82, Swiss politician, member of the National Council (1987–2011).
- Wolfram Heicking, 96, German composer and musicologist.
- Lorenz Horr, 80, German footballer (Hertha BSC, Wormatia Worms, Waldhof Mannheim).
- Howard James Hubbard, 84, American Roman Catholic prelate, bishop of Albany (1977–2014), stroke.
- Ron Cephas Jones, 66, American actor (This Is Us, Luke Cage, Mr. Robot), Emmy winner (2018, 2020), lung disease.
- Thomas Kuczynski, 78, German statistician and economist.
- Carlo Mazzone, 86, Italian football player (Roma) and manager (Ascoli, Fiorentina).
- Jean-Claude Nallet, 76, French Olympic sprinter (1968, 1976).
- Scott Nein, 72, American politician.
- James Parker, 47, American Olympic hammer thrower (2004).
- Vašo Patejdl, 68, Slovak musician and composer (Elán).
- François Roddier, 86, French astronomer.
- Kurt Schier, 94, German philologist.
- Francesco Scorsa, 76, Italian football player (Cesena, Ascoli) and manager (Casarano).
- John Warnock, 82, American computer scientist, co-founder of Adobe Inc., pancreatic cancer
- Eleanor Weinstock, 94, American politician, member of the Florida House of Representatives (1978–1986) and Senate (1987–1992), complications from Parkinson's disease.
- Nizo Yamamoto, 70, Japanese art director (Castle in the Sky, Princess Mononoke, Grave of the Fireflies), stomach cancer.
- Igor Yasulovich, 81, Russian actor (Nine Days in One Year, The Diamond Arm, It Can't Be!), film director and pedagogue.
- Tonino Zorzi, 88, Italian basketball player (Pallacanestro Varese, national team) and coach (Reyer Venezia).

=== 20 ===
- Naushad Ali, 79, Pakistani cricketer (national team).
- Gulzar Azmi, 88–89, Indian Muslim cleric.
- Constantin Bălăceanu-Stolnici, 100, Romanian neurologist.
- Wahid Bouzidi, 45, French comedian and actor (Tellement proches, Case départ, Super-héros malgré lui), stroke.
- Daniel Cohen, 70, French economist.
- Pierre Cornette de Saint-Cyr, 84, French art dealer.
- Isabel Crook, 107, Canadian-British anthropologist (Beijing Foreign Studies University).
- Peter P. Garibaldi, 91, American politician, member of the New Jersey Senate (1984–1988) and General Assembly (1968–1974), cancer.
- Jim Hendry, 83, English road racing cyclist.
- Michael Horgan, 89, Irish Olympic cyclist.
- David Jacobs, 84, American television writer (Dallas, Knots Landing, Paradise), complications from multiple infections.
- Aivars Lazdenieks, 69, Latvian rower, Olympic silver medallist (1976).
- Dale Patchett, 73, American politician, member of the Florida House of Representatives (1976–1990).
- Rusi Petrov, 79, Bulgarian Olympic wrestler (1972).
- Mickey Rupp, 87, American racecar driver, founder of Rupp Industries.
- Vic Seipke, 91, American bodybuilder.
- Harry Smith, 90, Australian army lieutenant colonel, recipient of the Military Cross.
- Howard Spodek, 81, American historian.
- Uteng Suryadiyatna, 80, Indonesian military officer and politician, vice governor of Jambi (1996–2001).
- Sze Hong Chew, 64, Singaporean news presenter, colon cancer.
- Bobby Taylor, 84, English-born Canadian football player (Calgary Stampeders, Toronto Argonauts), cancer.
- Jerry Turner, 69, American baseball player (San Diego Padres, Detroit Tigers, Chicago White Sox).
- Monica Van Kerrebroeck, 84, Belgian politician, member of the Flemish Parliament (2004–2009).
- Pentti Virrankoski, 94, Canadian-born Finnish historian.
- Bill Vukovich II, 79, American racing driver.
- Jennifer White Shah, 80, British actress (The Caesars, Carry On Doctor).
- Probo Yulastoro, 57, Indonesian businessman and politician, regent of Cilacap (2002–2010).
- Vladimir E. Zakharov, 84, Russian mathematician and physicist (Zakharov system, Zakharov–Schulman system).

=== 21 ===
- Sergei Babkov, 56, Russian basketball player (Unicaja Málaga, TBB Trier, national team) and coach.
- Laszlo Birinyi, 79, Hungarian-born American investor and businessman.
- Edward L. G. Bowell, 79, British-born American astronomer.
- Jean Canavaggio, 87, French biographer (Miguel de Cervantes).
- Stephen Farrow, 58, English convicted murderer.
- Elizabeth Hoffman, 97, American actress (Sisters, Dante's Peak, The River Wild).
- Abe Jacobs, 95, New Zealand professional wrestler (NWA).
- Rafael Lovera, 70, Paraguayan boxer, heart attack.
- Chris Martin, 59, New Zealand boxing manager and trainer, heart attack.
- Muhammad Hussain Najafi, 91, Pakistani Twelver Shia grand ayatollah.
- Yaakov Nimrodi, 97, Israeli publisher (Maariv) and intelligence officer.
- Carlos Pérez, 88, Colombian-born American oncologist.
- Eric Prescott, 75, English rugby union and rugby league player (St Helens, Salford, Lancashire).
- Evgeny Pronyuk, 86, Ukrainian human rights activist and politician, deputy (1994–1998).
- Andy Rankin, 79, English footballer (Watford, Everton, Huddersfield Town).
- Angelita Trujillo, 84, Dominican writer.
- Luvsansharavyn Tsend, 83, Mongolian Olympic speed skater (1964, 1968, 1972).

=== 22 ===
- Ahmed Abkar Barqo Abdel-Rahman, Sudanese politician.
- Mathilde van den Brink, 82, Dutch politician, MEP (1989–1994).
- Chrisje Comvalius, 75, Dutch actress (In Oranje, Off Screen, Achtste Groepers Huilen Niet).
- Tom Courtney, 90, American sprinter, double Olympic champion (1956), amyloidosis.
- Pastor Cuquejo, 83, Paraguayan Roman Catholic prelate, archbishop of Asunción (2002–2014).
- Toto Cutugno, 80, Italian singer-songwriter ("L'Italiano", "Insieme: 1992", "Solo noi") and musician, prostate cancer.
- Nicolas Gessner, 92, Swiss theatre and film director (Diamonds Are Brittle, The Blonde from Peking, The Thirteen Chairs) and screen writer.
- Ebrahim Golestan, 100, Iranian-British film director (Brick and Mirror) and writer.
- Nathan Louis Jackson, 44, American television producer (13 Reasons Why, Luke Cage, S.W.A.T.) and playwright.
- Sudharani Jena, 81, Indian actress (Parinam, Gapa Hele Bi Sata).
- Martin Laciga, 48, Swiss Olympic beach volleyball player (2000, 2004).
- Lê Văn Thành, 60, Vietnamese politician, deputy prime minister (since 2021).
- Fernando Legal, 91, Brazilian Roman Catholic prelate, bishop of Itapeva (1980–1985), Limeira (1985–1989) and São Miguel Paulista (1989–2008).
- Aharon Levran, 93, Israeli general.
- Ellen Malos, 85, Australian-British scholar and activist.
- Dun Mihaka, 81, New Zealand Māori activist, author, and political candidate.
- Bobby Noble, 77, English footballer (Manchester United).
- Ed Ochester, 83, American poet.
- Graeme O'Donnell, 85, Australian footballer (Geelong, North Melbourne).
- Susan Ople, 61, Filipino politician, secretary of migrant workers (since 2022), breast cancer.
- Ron Palenski, 78, New Zealand Hall of Fame sports journalist, historian and administrator, cancer.
- Alexandra Paul, 31, Canadian Olympic ice dancer (2014), traffic collision.
- C. R. Rao, 102, Indian-American mathematician and statistician (Cramér–Rao bound, Rao–Blackwell theorem).
- Herlander Ribeiro, 80, Portuguese Olympic freestyle swimmer (1960, 1964).
- Jim Romaniszyn, 71, American football player (Cleveland Browns, New England Patriots).
- Vaccine, 43, American musician and record producer.
- Derek Watts, 75, South African television presenter (Carte Blanche), lung cancer.
- René Weller, 69, German Olympic boxer (1976), complications from dementia.
- Manfred Zetzsche, 93, German actor (Johannes Kepler, Between Day and Night, Where Others Keep Silent).

=== 23 ===
- José Luis Álvarez, 93, Spanish politician, mayor of Madrid (1978–1979), minister of transport (1980–1981) and agriculture (1981–1982).
- Eduardo Barbosa, 64, Brazilian doctor and politician, deputy (1995–2023).
- Benjamin Bounkoulou, 80, Congolese politician, minister of foreign affairs (1992–1995) and senator (2002–2011).
- Peter Buchanan, 80, British architect, lung cancer.
- Francisco Dornelles, 88, Brazilian politician, twice acting governor of Rio de Janeiro, senator (2007–2015), and minister of labour (1999–2002).
- Gerald N. Felando, 88, American politician.
- Bob Feldman, 83, American musician (The Strangeloves), songwriter ("My Boyfriend's Back") and record producer ("Hang On Sloopy").
- Terry Funk, 79, American Hall of Fame professional wrestler (NWA, WWF) and actor (Road House), complications from dementia.
- Kalman Gerencseri, 78, French footballer (Lens, Auxerre).
- Chryss Goulandris, Lady O'Reilly, 73, Greek-American businesswoman.
- Robert Hale, 90, American bass-baritone opera singer (New York City Opera, Deutsche Oper Berlin).
- Joseph Hubert Hart, 91, American Roman Catholic prelate, auxiliary bishop (1976–1978) and bishop (1978–2001) of Cheyenne.
- Warren Hoge, 82, American journalist (The New York Times), pancreatic cancer.
- Raja Ram Karki, 66, Nepali politician, Bagmati MPA (since 2017).
- Vicente Lecaro, 87, Ecuadorian footballer (Barcelona S.C., national team).
- Hugh Murney, 84, Scottish footballer (Greenock Morton, Dumbarton, Queen of the South).
- Ingrid Olef, 83, German politician, member of the Landtag of Schleswig-Holstein (1992–1996).
- Hersha Parady, 78, American actress (Little House on the Prairie, Hyper Sapien: People from Another Star, The Break).
- Eugeniusz Patyk, 86, Polish politician, senator (1993–1997).
- Norman Pfeiffer, 82, American architect.
- Mikhail Pokpov, 98, Russian military officer and politician, member of the Soviet of Nationalities (1984–1989).
- William F. Pounds, 95, American academic.
- Andy Rincon, 64, American baseball player (St. Louis Cardinals).
- Austin Robertson Jr., 80, Australian Hall of Fame footballer (Subiaco, South Melbourne, Western Australia).
- Nui Sano, 90, Japanese painter, heart failure.
- Steve Sidwell, 78, American football coach (Colorado Buffaloes, New England Patriots, New Orleans Saints).
- Sire De Grugy, 17, French-bred British Selle Français racehorse, winner of the Queen Mother Champion Chase (2014).
- Ralph Smith, 84, American football player (Cleveland Browns, Philadelphia Eagles, Atlanta Falcons).
- Theuns Stofberg, 68, South African rugby union player (Free State Cheetahs, Northern Transvaal, national team), traffic collision.
- Mohammad Ullah, 73, Bangladeshi politician, MP (1986–1988), traffic collision.
- Notable Russians killed in the Wagner Group plane crash:
  - Valery Chekalov, 47, mercenary leader
  - Yevgeny Prigozhin, 62, mercenary leader, co-founder of Wagner Group
  - Dmitry Utkin, 53, intelligence officer and mercenary leader, co-founder of Wagner Group

=== 24 ===
- Michael Anthony, 93, Trinidadian author.
- Bulat Baekenov, 80, Kazakh politician, minister of internal affairs (1994–1995).
- Tom Barton, 74, Australian politician, Queensland MLA (1992–2006).
- Gerd Bauer, 72, German politician, member of the Landtag of Saarland (1994–2001).
- Henry Reed Cooper, 82, Liberian judge, chief justice (2003–2006).
- Seema Deo, 81, Indian actress (Saraswatichandra, Anand, Naseeb Apna Apna), complications from Alzheimer's disease.
- Craig Henriquez, 64, American biomedical engineer.
- Andrzej Kasprzak, 77, Polish Olympic basketball player (1968, 1972).
- Lawrence Francis Kramer, 90, American politician, mayor of Paterson, New Jersey (1967–1972, 1975–1982).
- Bernie Marsden, 72, English rock guitarist (Whitesnake) and songwriter ("Fool for Your Loving", "Here I Go Again").
- George Montgomery, 90, American drag racer.
- Claude Picasso, 76, French photographer, cinematographer, and graphic designer.
- Barbara Rossi, 82, American artist.
- Aaron Schechter, 95, American Haredi rabbi.
- Ignacio Solares, 78, Mexican writer.
- Arleen Sorkin, 67, American actress (Days of Our Lives, Batman: The Animated Series, Duet), complications from multiple sclerosis.
- Keith Spicer, 89, Canadian public servant, commissioner of official languages (1970–1977).
- Pascal Vanderveeren, 77, Belgian lawyer.
- Belisario Velasco, 87, Chilean politician, minister of the interior (2006–2008), cancer.
- Bray Wyatt, 36, American professional wrestler (WWE), heart attack.
- Ta'Kiya Young, 21, American alleged shoplifter, shot.

=== 25 ===
- Ismet Ahmad, 78, Indonesian academic, bureaucrat, and lecturer.
- V. A. Andamuthu, Indian politician, Tamil Nadu MLA (1996–2001).
- Andre Barreau, 67, British guitarist (The Bootleg Beatles).
- Merv Cross, 82, Australian rugby league player (South Sydney, Eastern Suburbs, North Sydney) and orthopaedic surgeon.
- Walt Curtis, 82, American poet.
- Tijl De Decker, 22, Belgian racing cyclist, traffic collision.
- Joseph T. Ferraracci, 86, American politician.
- Sergey Alexandrovich Filatov, 87, Russian politician, chief of staff of presidential executive office (1993–1996).
- Rob Fruithof, 71, Dutch actor and television presenter, cancer.
- Carlos Gonzaga, 99, Brazilian singer.
- Yoel Hoffmann, 86, Israeli writer and translator.
- Philip Ingamells, 76, Australian conservationist, photographer, and writer.
- Juliana Jirousová, 79, Czech painter and dissident (Charter 77).
- George Owen Mackie, 93, British-Canadian zoologist.
- Diane de Margerie, 95, French writer and translator.
- Hugo Alberto Mott, 94–95, Argentine doctor and politician, governor of Catamarca Province (1973–1976).
- Armando Pellegrini, 90, Italian racing cyclist.
- Andrii Pilshchykov, 30, Ukrainian fighter pilot, plane crash.
- Shahriyar Rahimov, 34, Azerbaijani footballer (Kapaz, Sabail, national team), cancer.
- Barry Thornton, 83, Australian rules footballer (Footscray).
- Sanjay Verma, Indian film editor (Kaho Naa... Pyaar Hai, Khoon Bhari Maang, Karan Arjun) and sound designer.
- Ukrainians killed in airplane collision:
  - Viacheslav Minka, 62–63, military pilot
  - Serhii Prokazin, military pilot

=== 26 ===
- Geraldo Majella Agnelo, 89, Brazilian Roman Catholic cardinal, archbishop of São Salvador da Bahia (1999–2011), complications from a stroke.
- Bob Barker, 99, American game show host (The Price Is Right, Truth or Consequences) and animal welfare activist, 18-time Emmy winner, complications from Alzheimer's disease.
- John Benton-Harris, 83, American photographer.
- Bosse Broberg, 85, Swedish jazz trumpeter and composer.
- Parris H. Chang, 86, Taiwanese scholar and politician, MP (1993–2005).
- Carl Cohen, 92, American philosopher.
- Mario Costa, 86, Italian philosopher, author, and art theorist.
- Jerold A. Edmondson, 81, American linguist.
- Viacheslav Eshba, 74, Abkhaz pilot and politician, minister of defence (2003–2005).
- Faye Fantarrow, 21, English singer, cancer.
- Emilia Ferreiro, 86, Argentine pedagogue, psychologist and writer.
- Milton Francisco Guerra Calderón, 48, Guatemalan farmer and politician, deputy (2012–2020), shot.
- K. P. Hariharaputhran, 79, Indian film editor (Sheshakriya, Punjabi House, Thenkasi Pattanam).
- Tobias Hill, 53, English poet and author, glioblastoma.
- Kim Suk-won, 78, South Korean automotive and scouting executive, president of SsangYong Group (1975–1998).
- Dev Kohli, 80, Indian poet and lyricist (Maine Pyar Kiya, Baazigar, Hum Aapke Hain Koun..!).
- Lasse J. Laine, 77, Finnish ornithologist.
- Bertrand Marchand, 70, French football player (Rennes) and manager (Étoile du Sahel, Tunisia national team).
- MC Marcinho, 45, Brazilian funk melody singer, multiple organ failure.
- Clay Mathile, 82, American pet food industry executive, CEO of Iams (1982–1999).
- Gerold Meraner, 83, Italian politician, member of the Landtag of South Tyrol (1983–1993).
- Gleb Panfilov, 89, Russian film director and screenwriter (The Theme, Vassa, The Romanovs: An Imperial Family).
- Bert Papenfuß, 67, German poet, cancer.
- Zbigniew Pawłowicz, 79, Polish doctor and politician, senator (2007–2011), MP (2015–2019).
- Yvon Pedneault, 77, Canadian ice hockey broadcaster (TVA, Réseau des Sports, TQS), cancer.
- Andrzej Precigs, 74, Polish actor (Akcja pod Arsenałem).
- Tony Roberts, 94, American Hall of Fame sportscaster (Notre Dame Fighting Irish).
- Donnell Ryan, 82, Australian barrister and jurist, judge of the Federal Court (1986–2011).

=== 27 ===
- Svetlana Adyrkhaeva, 85, Russian ballerina, People's Artist of the USSR (1984).
- Michael Brougham, 5th Baron Brougham and Vaux, 85, British aristocrat and politician, member of the House of Lords (since 1968).
- Hans Büchi, 94, Swiss Olympic boxer.
- Pat Corrales, 82, American baseball player (Philadelphia Phillies, Cincinnati Reds) and manager (Texas Rangers), World Series champion (1995).
- Harold Crouch, 83, Australian political scientist and scholar.
- Gregoria Díaz, 58, Venezuelan journalist.
- Barry Durrant-Peatfield, 86, British medical practitioner.
- Frank Ehmann, 89, American basketball player.
- Éléonore Faucher, 50, French film director and screenwriter (A Common Thread), cancer.
- Maurice Lucien Fréchard, 95, French Roman Catholic prelate, archbishop of Auch (1996–2004).
- Karel Holomek, 86, Czech Roma activist, dissident and politician, MP (1990–1992).
- Robert C. Holub, 74, American Germanist and academic administrator, chancellor of UMass (2008–2012).
- Mac Huddleston, 79, American politician, member of the Mississippi House of Representatives (since 2008), multiple myeloma.
- Anvar Ibragimov, 57, Russian fencer, Olympic champion (1988).
- Joe the Plumber, 49, American political activist and commentator, pancreatic cancer.
- Des Raj Kali, 52, Indian writer and journalist, liver ailment.
- Dennis Kramer, 31, German basketball player (BG Göttingen), traffic collision.
- Doug Kyle, 91, Canadian Olympic runner (1956, 1960), injuries sustained in a traffic collision.
- Franne Lee, 81, American costume designer (Candide, Sweeney Todd: The Demon Barber of Fleet Street, Saturday Night Live).
- Jayanta Mahapatra, 94, Indian poet, pneumonia.
- Brian McBride, 53, American musician (Stars of the Lid, Bell Gardens).
- David McGee, 75, British-born New Zealand lawyer and public servant, clerk of the House of Representatives (1985–2007), King's Counsel (since 2000).
- J. Tinsley Oden, 86, American engineer, founder of the Oden Institute for Computational Engineering and Sciences.
- Paul D. Phillips, 105, American brigadier general.
- Denyse Plummer, 69, Trinidadian singer, cancer.
- Motiur Rahman, 81, Bangladeshi politician, minister of religious affairs (2014–2018) and MP (2008–2014).
- Alojz Rakús, 76, Slovak politician, MP (1990–1992, 1998–2002).
- Jonathan E. Sheppard, 82, English Hall of Fame Thoroughbred horse trainer, complications from lyme disease.
- Stanley Simon, 93, American politician, member of the New York City Council (1973–1978), and Bronx borough president (1979–1987).
- Rich Stubler, 74, American football coach (Toronto Argonauts, Hamilton Tiger-Cats, Edmonton Eskimos).
- Don Sundquist, 87, American politician, governor of Tennessee (1995–2003), member of the U.S. House of Representatives (1983–1995), complications from surgery.
- Minna Tarkka, 62, Finnish art critic and curator.
- Mariella Trejos, 75, Colombian-Peruvian actress (Simplemente María, Todo sobre Camila).
- Fritz H. Windhorst, 88, American jurist, lawyer and politician, member of the Louisiana State Senate (1972–1992).

=== 28 ===
- August 08, 31, American singer-songwriter ("I'm the One"), shot.
- Yves Caron, 85, Canadian politician, MP (1972–1979).
- Len Chandler, 88, American folk musician.
- Bill Dinwiddie, 80, American basketball player (Boston Celtics, Milwaukee Bucks).
- Anghelache Donescu, 77, Romanian equestrian, Olympic bronze medallist (1980).
- Carlos Falquez, 81, Ecuadorian businessman and politician, five-time deputy.
- Janet Dean Fodor, 81, American linguist.
- Alan Haworth, Baron Haworth, 75, British politician, member of the House of Lords (since 2004), heart attack.
- Tina Howe, 85, American playwright (Pride's Crossing, Coastal Disturbances, Painting Churches), complications from a hip fracture.
- Carl C. Johnson, 97, American Army Air Force colonel (Tuskegee Airmen).
- Edith Graef McGeer, 99, American-Canadian neuroscientist.
- Dennis J. Murphy, 91, American major general.
- Rabban al-Qas, 74, Iraqi Chaldean Catholic prelate, bishop of Amadiya (2001–2021).
- Bob Ratcliffe, 71, English cricketer (Lancashire).
- Neville Roper, 101, Canadian politician, Alberta MLA (1967–1971).
- Sarava, 24, American Thoroughbred racehorse, winner of the Belmont Stakes (2002).
- Günter Schliwka, 67, German Olympic weightlifter (1980).
- Michael Scriven, 95, British-born Australian academic philosopher.
- Sonny Seiler, 90, American attorney and football mascot owner (Uga).
- Kazi Shahid Ahmed, 82, Bangladeshi businessperson, education entrepreneur and journalist, founder of Gemcon Group.
- Ken Stephens, 92, American football coach (Central Arkansas, Lamar, Arkansas Tech).
- Roger Van Hool, 82, Belgian actor (Oscar, Woman Between Wolf and Dog, The Woman Next Door).
- Noke Wangnao, 86, Indian politician, Nagaland MLA (1974–1993, 2003–2008, since 2013).
- Robert Walls, 82, Australian vice admiral.
- Teeuwynn Woodruff, 56, American writer and game designer (Dungeons & Dragons, Wraith: The Oblivion, World of Darkness), cardiac arrest.
- John Zajac Jr., 90, American politician, member of the Connecticut State Senate (1971–1974) and House of Representatives (1977–1993).

=== 29 ===
- Taiwo Akinkunmi, 87, Nigerian civil servant, designer of the flag of Nigeria.
- Yelena Avdeyeva, 55, Russian politician, senator (since 2019), mayor of Cherepovets (2017–2019).
- Sarojini Balanandan, 85, Indian politician.
- Coolidge Ball, 71, American basketball player (Ole Miss Rebels).
- Alix Boyd Knights, 78, Dominican politician, speaker of the House of Assembly (2000–2020).
- Don Browne, 80, American media executive (Telemundo).
- Nancy Buirski, 78, American film director (A Crime on the Bayou, Desperate Souls, Dark City and the Legend of Midnight Cowboy) and producer (Loving).
- Hernán Chacón Soto, 86, Chilean military officer, convicted kidnapper and murderer of Víctor Jara, suicide by gunshot.
- Jamie Christopher, 52, British assistant director (Harry Potter, Guardians of the Galaxy, Star Wars: The Last Jedi), heart complications.
- Pierre Court, 90, French Olympic field hockey player.
- Jamie Crick, 57, British radio broadcaster (Classic FM, Jazz FM, Scala Radio).
- Sebastian DeFrancesco, 69, American Paralympic athlete and table tennis player.
- Mike Enriquez, 71, Filipino television and radio newscaster (Saksi, Imbestigador, 24 Oras), cardiac arrest.
- Ahmo Hight, 50, American fitness model and actress.
- Dorothy Isaksen, 93, Australian politician, New South Wales MLA (1978–1988, 1990–1999).
- Peter King, 84, Nigerian multi-instrumentalist and bandleader.
- Robert Klane, 81, American screenwriter (Where's Poppa?, National Lampoon's European Vacation, Weekend at Bernie's), kidney failure.
- E. Denise Lee, 71, American politician, member of the Florida House of Representatives (1998–2000).
- Stanisław Papież, 58, Polish journalist and politician, MP (2001–2005, 2006–2007).
- John Quenby, 81, British motorsport executive, CEO of the RAC Motor Sports Association (1990–2001).
- Katalin Rényi, 72, Hungarian painter.
- Botha Rossouw, 53, South African rugby union player (Western Transvaal, South Western Districts).
- Guillermo Teillier, 79, Chilean politician, deputy (2010–2022).
- Don Valento, 90, American politician.
- Waldemar Victorino, 71, Uruguayan footballer (Nacional, River Plate, national team), suicide by gunshot.
- Bertil Zachrisson, 97, Swedish politician, MP (1969–1983) and minister of education (1973–1976).

=== 30 ===
- Mohamed Al-Fayed, 94, Egyptian hotelier and football executive, owner of Hôtel Ritz Paris (since 1979), Harrods (1985–2010), and Fulham F.C. (1997–2013).
- Kutbettin Arzu, 68, Turkish politician, minister of agriculture (2015) and MP (2007–2011).
- Kazi M. Badruddoza, 96, Bangladeshi agronomist.
- Montserrat Galí Boadella, 76, Mexican art historian.
- Ann Fox, 89, American nun.
- Jan Jongbloed, 82, Dutch footballer (DWS, Amsterdam, national team).
- Jess Larochelle, 40, Canadian soldier.
- Arthur Leong, 92, Chinese-born New Zealand footballer (Hamilton Technical Old Boys, New Zealand national team).
- Andrea 't Mannetje, 51, New Zealand epidemiologist.
- Tim Norman, 79, English jockey.
- Md. Abdul Quddus, 76, Bangladeshi politician, MP (1991–1995, 1996–2001, since 2009).
- Ola Rask, 83, Swedish politician, MP (1994–2006).
- Norman Rodgers, 95, American politician, member of the Iowa State Senate (1973–1987).
- Gennady Sapunov, 84, Russian Olympic wrestler (1968).
- Dai Shimamura, 63, Japanese politician, MP (since 2013).
- Jack Sonni, 68, American musician (Dire Straits), marketing executive and writer.
- Michael Steed, 83, British psephologist and politician, president of the Liberal Party (1978–1979).
- Piero Trapanelli, 99, Italian footballer (Varese, Pisa, Treviso).
- Athanasios Xarchas, 92, Greek politician, MP (1981–1993) and minister of trade (1990–1991).

=== 31 ===
- Tantely Andrianarivo, 69, Malagasy politician, prime minister (1998–2002).
- Lola Botella, 78, Spanish politician, mayor of Carcaixent (1999–2015), deputy (2007–2011, 2014–2015).
- Gil Brandt, 91, American Hall of Fame football executive (Dallas Cowboys, Los Angeles Rams, San Francisco 49ers).
- Salatiel Carvalho, 69, Brazilian pastor, engineer, and politician, deputy (1987–2003).
- Aram Chobanian, 94, American educator, president of Boston University (2005).
- Robert Clegg Jr., 69, American politician, member of the New Hampshire Senate (2002–2008).
- Steve Crump, 65–66, American journalist (WBTV) and documentary film producer, colon cancer.
- Curtis Fowlkes, 73, American jazz trombonist and singer, heart failure.
- Gayle Hunnicutt, 80, American actress (Dallas, Marlowe, Fragment of Fear).
- Douglas Lenat, 72, American artificial intelligence researcher, founder and CEO of Cycorp.
- Silvina Luna, 43, Argentinian actress (Gran Hermano) and model, complications from surgery.
- Marti Maraden, 78, American-born Canadian actress.
- Aparna P. Nair, 33, Indian actress (Kodathi Samaksham Balan Vakeel), suicide by hanging.
- Timothy Nolen, 82, American actor (The Phantom of the Opera, Sweeney Todd, Grind).
- Gboyega Odubanjo, 27, British-Nigerian poet. (body discovered on this date)
- Peter Olds, 79, New Zealand poet.
- John M. Opitz, 88, German-American medical geneticist.
- Bill Pinkney, 87, American Hall of Fame sailor.
- Clairy Polak, 67, Dutch journalist and radio and television presenter (Nova).
- Anatoliy Sass, 87, Russian rower, Olympic champion (1968).
