= Birkinshaw =

Birkinshaw may refer to:

== People with the surname ==
- Alan Birkinshaw (born 1944), British film director and producer
- James Birkinshaw (born 1980), English speedway rider
- John Birkinshaw, English railway engineer
- Julian Birkinshaw, English academic
- Mark Birkinshaw, British physicist
- Steve Birkinshaw, British fell runner
- William Birkinshaw Wilkinson (1854–1927), British businessman
