= Athanasios Xarchas =

Greek lawyer and politician (1931–2023)

Athanasios Xarchas (Greek: Αθανάσιος Ξαρχάς; 15 April 1931 – 30 August 2023) was a Greek lawyer and politician.

== Life and career ==
Xarchas studied law in the University of Athens.

He was elected member of parliament of Phthiotis with New Democracy from 1981 to 1993, while he served as minister of trade from April 1990 until August 1991, as part of the Mitsotakis government.

Xarchas died on 30 August 2023, at the age of 92.
