= Kostis Gimossoulis =

Greek poet and novelist (1960–2023)

- Born: 1960; Athens, Greece
- Died: 7 August 2023 (aged 63); Athens, Greece
- Occupations: Poet, novelist
- Writing career
- Period: 1983–2023

Kostis Gimossoulis (Greek: Κωστής Γκιμοσούλης; 1960 – 7 August 2023) was a Greek poet and novelist. He studied law at the University of Athens. He was also a draughtsman and watercolorist, and Μαύρος Χρυσός (Black Gold), a book he published in 2001, contains poems, stories and watercolors he produced.

Gimossoulis died on 7 August 2023, at the age of 63.

== Selected works ==
=== Poetry ===
- Ο ξυλοκόπος πυρετός (The fever of the thief),1983
- Η Αγία Μελάνη (Fully ink), 1983
- Το στόμα κλέφτης (The thief mouth), 1986
- Επικίνδυνα παιδιά (Dangerous boys), 1992
- Αγάπη από ζήλια (Jealously returning to Love), anthology, 2004

=== Prose ===
- Μια νύχτα με την κόκκινη (One night with red woman), 1995
- Ανατολή (Anatoli), 1998
- Βρέχει φως (Rained Light), 2002
