= Vic Seipke =

American bodybuilder (1932–2023)

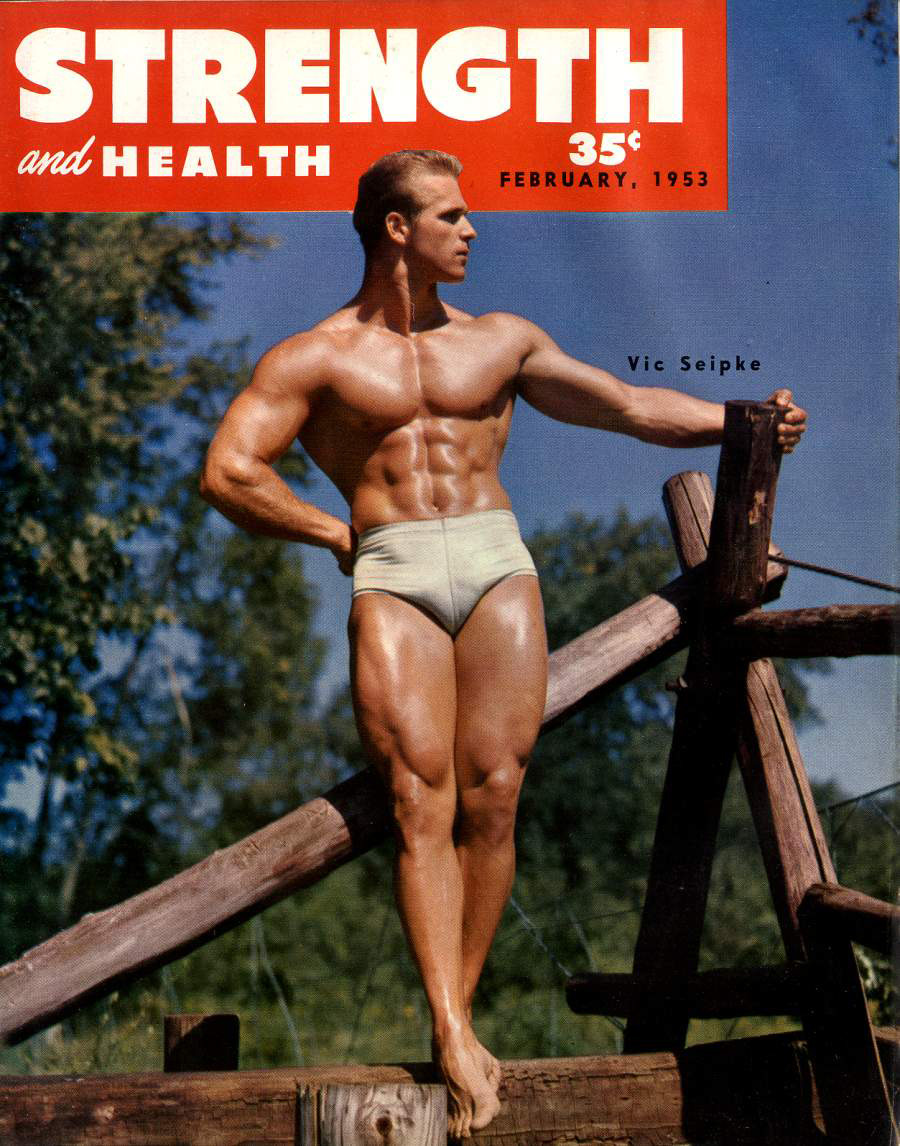
Seipke on the cover of February 1953 issue of Strength & Health magazine.

Victor Herbert Seipke (April 23, 1932 – August 20, 2023) was an American bodybuilder. His titles included Mr. Michigan (1951), Junior Mr. America (1955) and Mr. America-Masters (1976).

Seipke worked as a fireman in Detroit, Michigan. He died in The Villages, Florida, on August 20, 2023, at the age of 91.
