= Craig Henriquez =

American biomedical engineer (1958/1959–2023)

- Born: Craig Shelby Henriquez; January 21, 1959
- Died: August 24, 2023 (aged 64)
- Education: Duke University (BS, PhD)
- Awards: Fellow, AIMBE; Young Investigator's Award, NIH
- Scientific career
- Fields: Biomedical engineering; Computer science
- Thesis: Structure and Volume Conductor Effects on Propagation in Cardiac Tissue (1988)
- Doctoral advisor: Robert Plonsey

Craig Shelby Henriquez (January 21, 1959– August 24, 2023) was an American biomedical engineer, Professor of Biomedical Engineering and Computer Science at the Duke University, and was the co-founder and co-director of the Center for Neuroengineering. His research interests were in the areas of large-scale computer modeling of the cardiac bidomain and neuroengineering. He was a fellow of the American Institute for Medical and Biological Engineering.

== Biography ==
Craig Shelby Henriquez was born on January 21, 1959 in Mount Kisco, New York. He was the middle child of three born to parents Armando “Mickey” and Martha Henriquez. In 1977, he graduated from John Jay High School in Katonah, New York, where he was the class valedictorian.

Henriquez received the Bachelor of Science (B.S.) degrees in both biomedical engineering and electrical engineering from Duke University in 1981. He continued his studies at Duke and received the Doctor of Philosophy (Ph.D.) degree in biomedical engineering in 1988. His Ph.D. advisor was Robert Plonsey and his dissertation was titled "Structure and Volume Conductor Effects on Propagation in Cardiac Tissue". Henriquez was appointed Research Assistant Professor in 1989, Assistant Professor in 1991, and Associate Professor in 1998 in the Departments of Biomedical Engineering and Computer Science at Duke University. In 2001, he was named the first Medtronic Visiting Professor of Virtual Electrophysiology, in the Department of Cardiology, University of Lausanne, Switzerland.

In 2003, Henriquez and Miguel Nicolelis founded and co-directed the Center for Neuroengineering where they developed a Brain Machine Interface in which electrode arrays were implanted into a monkey's brain that were able to detect the monkey's motor intent and thus able to control reaching and grasping movements performed by a robotic arm.

Henriquez was elected to serve as the chair of the Duke University's Academic Council from 2009-2011. He was the James L. and Elizabeth M. Vincent Professor of Biomedical Engineering and served as the chairman of the Department of Biomedical engineering from 2011 to 2014. He also served on several journal editorial boards.

Craig Henriquez died on August 24, 2023, at the age of 64. He was posthumously awarded Duke University's 2023-24 Presidential Award.

Awards

- 1992, Young Investigator's (FIRST) Award from the NIH 1997
- 2001, the Bass Professor from Duke University
- 2006, elected a Fellow of the American Institute for Medical and Biological Engineering

== Selected publications ==
Articles, a selection

- Carmena, JM; Lebedev, MA; Crist, RE; O'Doherty, JE; Santucci, DM; Dimitrov, DF; Patil, PG; Henriquez, CS; Nicolelis, Miguel Ângelo Laporta (2003), "Learning to control a brain-machine interface for reaching and grasping by primates", PLOS Biology, 1 (2): 193–208, doi:10.1371/journal.pbio.0000042, PMC 261882, PMID 14624244.
- Henriquez, CS (1993), Simulating the electrical behavior of cardiac tissue using the bidomain model, vol. 21, Critical Reviews of Biomedical Engineering, pp. 1–77.
