= Cabinet of Ivory Coast =

Cabinet of Ivory Coast is the executive branch of the Government of the Ivory Coast.

== Governments ==
- Achi I government
- Achi II government

== See also ==
- Politics of Ivory Coast
