= Laszlo Birinyi =

American investor, businessman (1943–2023)

- Born: September 20, 1943; Karcag, Hungary
- Died: August 21, 2023 (aged 79); Southport, Connecticut, U.S.
- Education: University of North Carolina at Chapel Hill (BA); New York University (MBA)
- Occupation: Investor
- Spouse: Jill Costelloe (m. 1986)
- Children: 2

Laszlo Birinyi Jr. (/bʌriːniː/; September 20, 1943 – August 21, 2023) was an American investor, businessman, and the founder of Birinyi Associates, Inc. and Asset Management Arm.

== Personal life ==
Laszlo Birinyi Jr. was born in Karcag, Hungary, in 1943. When he was seven, his family moved to the United States, settling in Lancaster, Pennsylvania. He graduated from the University of North Carolina at Chapel Hill in 1967, with a major in history, and earned an MBA from the New York University Graduate School of Business in 1975.

After Birinyi's first marriage ended in divorce, he married Jill Costelloe in 1986, and they had two daughters. Birinyi died from heart failure at his home in Southport, Connecticut, on August 21, 2023, at the age of 79.

== Career ==
Birinyi started his career in the investment industry as a trader, and then worked at Salomon Brothers starting from 1976 as an equity researcher and market analyst, later being promoted to head of equity market analysis. In that position he constructed the Stock Week – a weekly commentary containing studies subjects such as fund flow, market structure, and volatility. He helped establish the Salomon-Russell International Index.

=== Birinyi Associates ===
Birinyi launched Birinyi Associates in 1989, following his departure from Salomon Brothers. While founder and director of the firm, he still worked for Deutsche Bank Securities as Global Trading Strategist from 1988 until 2002.

Through his work at Birinyi Associates, Inc., he established a stock market research firm that analyzes the psychology and history of the stock market and the actions of investors in order to predict stock trends. He often made contributions to Forbes (where he was also a columnist), Wall Street Journal, Barron's, BusinessWeek and Bloomberg Personal Finance. He has appeared as a guest on CNBC and Bloomberg TV, and was also a panelist for Louis Rukeyser's Wall $treet Week. He continued to write investment analyses until days before his death.

Birinyi was the author of The Master Trader: Birinyi's Secrets to Understanding the Market (2013, ISBN 978-1118774731) and The Equity Desk – a book about stock market trading.

== Philanthropic efforts ==
In 2001, Birinyi launched the Laszlo Birinyi Sr. Distinguished Professorship in Hungarian Culture at the University of North Carolina in honor of his father. This $1 million endowment was "the first Hungarian culture professorship in the South, and it distinguishes Carolina as one of the few places in the United States where students may work with an expert in Hungarian studies."
