= Ward Demuyt =

Belgian politician (1935–2023)

Member of the Chamber of Representatives of Belgium for the Arrondissement of Bruges
- In office 24 November 1991 – 20 May 1995

Personal details
- Born: 20 January 1935 Oostkamp, Belgium
- Died: 2 August 2023 (aged 88) Oostkamp, Belgium
- Party: CVP

Ward Demuyt (20 January 1935 – 2 August 2023) was a Belgian politician. A member of the Christian People's Party, he served in the Chamber of Representatives from 1991 to 1995.

Demuyt died in Oostkamp on 2 August 2023, at the age of 88.
