= Zbigniew Pawłowicz =

Polish politician (1943–2023)

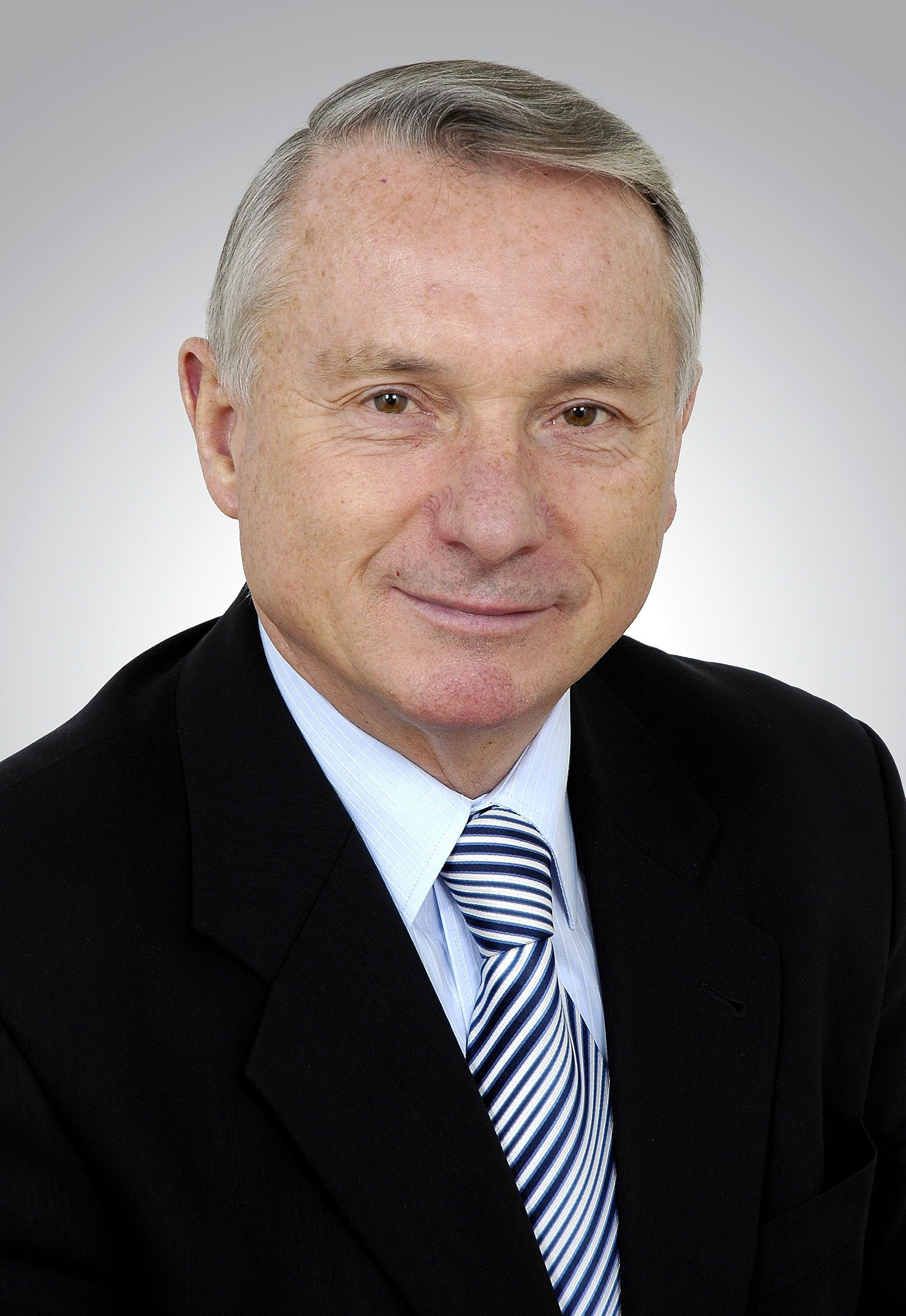
- Pawłowicz in 2011

Member of the Sejm
- In office 12 November 2015 – 16 October 2019

Member of the Senate of Poland
- In office 5 November 2007 – 7 November 2011

Personal details
- Born: Zbigniew Michał Pawłowicz; 22 September 1943 Kamień Koszyrski, General Government
- Died: 26 August 2023 (aged 79)
- Party: PO
- Education: Wojskowa Akademia Medyczna im. gen. dyw. Bolesława Szareckiego
- Occupation: Doctor

Zbigniew Michał Pawłowicz (22 September 1943 – 26 August 2023) was a Polish doctor and politician. A member of the Civic Platform, he served in the Senate from 2007 to 2011 and in the Sejm from 2015 to 2019.

Pawłowicz died on 26 August 2023, at the age of 79.
