= Bruno Ferrero (footballer) =

French footballer (1933–2023)

Personal information
- Date of birth: 24 November 1933
- Place of birth: Tressange, France
- Date of death: 15 August 2023 (aged 89)
- Height: 1.72 m (5 ft 8 in)
- Position: Goalkeeper

Senior career*
| Years | Team | Apps | (Gls) |
| 1957–1958 | FC Nancy | 5 | (0) |
| 1958–1959 | Forbach | 36 | (0) |
| 1959–1965 | FC Nancy | 174 | (0) |
| 1965–1969 | US Rumelange | | |
| 1969–1972 | Jeunesse sportive audunoise | | |
| 1972–1975 | Fola Esch | | |

International career
| 1962 | France | 1 | (0) |
- * Club domestic league appearances and goals

Bruno Ferrero (24 November 1933 – 15 August 2023) was a French footballer who played as a goalkeeper. He was a finalist in the 1961–62 Coupe de France with FC Nancy and was once selected to play for the France national team.
