= R.C. Bales =

American bull rider

- Born: July 10, 1930; McKinney, Texas, U.S.
- Died: August 16, 2023 (aged 93)
- Occupation: Bull rider

R.C. Bales (July 10, 1930 – August 16, 2023), nicknamed "Granny" and "Cotton", was an American professional rodeo cowboy who specialized in bull riding.

== Life and career ==
Bales was born in McKinney, Texas, the son of Riley and Elsie Bales. At the age of 15, he began his rodeo career, and in 1948, he joined the Rodeo Cowboys Association. He competed in rodeo events in Mexico.

In 1965, Bales competed at the Southwestern Exposition and Livestock Show in Fort Worth, Texas, and in the same year, he competed in the bull-riding event at the Louisiana State Fair Annual Rodeo Set. In 1967, he competed at the Cheyenne Frontier Days, placing first in the same event. He was named the "first cowboy to win a 150-head bull riding" by the Texas Rodeo Cowboy Hall of Fame, and in 1971, he retired from his rodeo career.

In 2023, Bales was inducted into the Bull Riding Hall of Fame.

== Death ==
Bales died on August 16, 2023, at the age of 93.
