= Will Dockery Carpenter =

Will Dockery Carpenter (July 13, 1930 – August 15, 2023) was an American scientist and philanthropist, who after earning a Ph.D. in plant physiology at Purdue University in 1958, began a 34-year professional career at Monsanto Company, during which time he headed the teams that tested and brought to market Lasso and Roundup. Because of his extensive knowledge and his notable participation in the Chemical Manufacturer's Association, Carpenter became deeply involved in the efforts to obtain a worldwide chemical weapons treaty from 1978 through 2003. He was the primary representative for the American Chemical Manufacturers Association during those successful negotiations that led to the signing and ratification of the Chemical Weapons Convention, testifying numerous times before Congress and working with chemical companies worldwide to help bring them on board with the terms of the treaty. Out of that convention, the Organisation for the Prohibition of Chemical Weapons was formed, an organization that won the 2013 Nobel Peace Prize. After the formation of the OPCW, Carpenter was named as the U.S. representative to the Scientific Advisory Board. He was awarded The AAAS Hilliard Roderick Prize for Excellence in Science, Arms Control, and International Security. in 1992 for his participation on the Chemical Weapons Convention. Carpenter died at his home in Chesterfield, Missouri on August 15, 2023, at the age of 93.

== Philanthropies ==
- Will Carpenter Adaptive Biotechnology Seminar Series.
- Will D. Carpenter Endowed Scholarship in the College of Ag and Life Sciences.
- Will D. Carpenter Endowed Scholarship in the Department of Biochemistry, Molecular Biology, Entomology and Plant Pathology.
- Thomas Lawrence Promise Endowed Scholarship.
- Will D. Carpenter Distinguished Field Scientist Graduate Assistantship.
- The Hellen and Will Carpenter Series on contemporary Issues in American Society.
