= David Counts (politician) =

American politician (1936–2023)

Member of the Texas House of Representatives from the 78th district
- In office November 29, 1988 – January 12, 1993

Member of the Texas House of Representatives from the 70th district
- In office January 12, 1993 – January 14, 2003

Personal details
- Born: Walter David Counts Jr. July 14, 1936 Munday, Texas, U.S.
- Died: August 18, 2023 (aged 87) Midland, Texas, U.S.
- Party: Democratic
- Education: West Texas State University; North Texas State University

Walter David Counts Jr. (July 14, 1936 – August 18, 2023) was an American politician. He served as a Democratic member for the 70th and 78th district of the Texas House of Representatives.

== Life and career ==
Walter David Counts Jr. was born July 14, 1936 in Munday, Texas, to Walter and Alma Counts. He attended West Texas State University and North Texas State University. In July 1956 at the age of 20 he married Mary Mullins with whom he had two children.

Counts joined the Texas Army National Guard in 1953 and served for 32 years retiring as Colonel and later being awarded the rank of Brigadier General with a brevet promotion. Counts founded two businesses, the Counts Insurance Agency and Counts Real Estate.

In September 1988 Counts was certified as the Democratic candidate to run against Republican Rod Waller for house district 78 to replace Democrat Steve Carriker who moved to the senate. He stood on a platform for better education for all, support of rural Texas, support for the elderly, getting criminals off the street and not raising taxes. Counts won 18,649 votes to 12,583 taking ten out of the twelve district counties. Counts served in the Texas House of Representatives from 1988 to 2003 representing district 78 three times and then district 70 five times. He served on several committees including being the chair of Auto Theft and Uninsured Motorists, Special, Insurance Subcommittee on Budget and Oversight and Natural Resources five times.

Counts died at his home in Midland, Texas on August 18, 2023, at the age of 87.
