= Mark E. Noennig =

American politician (1947–2023)

Member of the Montana House of Representatives
- In office 1999–2006

Personal details
- Born: November 19, 1947 Minneapolis, Minnesota, U.S.
- Died: August 2, 2023 (aged 75)
- Party: Republican
- Spouse: Sharon Grubbs
- Education: Montana State University; University of Montana

Mark E. Noennig (November 19, 1947 – August 2, 2023) was an American politician. He served as a Republican member of the Montana House of Representatives.

== Life and career ==
Mark E. Noennig was born in Minneapolis, Minnesota, on November 19, 1947. He attended Montana State University and the University of Montana.

Noennig served in the Montana House of Representatives from 1999 to 2006.

Noennig died on August 2, 2023, at the age of 75.
