= Olivier Guillot =

French academic and historian (1932–2023)

President of the Centre vendéen de recherches historiques
- In office 2013

President of the Société d'histoire du droit
- In office 1990–1999
- Preceded by: Gérard Sautel
- Succeeded by: Anne Lefebvre-Teillard

Personal details
- Born: 3 April 1932 14th arrondissement of Paris, France
- Died: 17 August 2023 (aged 91) Château-Gontier, France
- Education: Sciences Po; Paris-Panthéon-Assas University
- Occupation: Professor; Historian

Olivier Guillot (French: [ɔlivje ɡijɔ]; 3 April 1932 – 17 August 2023) was a French academic and historian. He served as president of the Société d'histoire du droit from 1990 to 1999 and president of the Centre vendéen de recherches historiques in 2013.

Guillot died on 17 August 2023, at the age of 91.

== Publications ==
- Le comte d'Anjou et son entourage (1972)
- Pouvoirs et institutions dans la France médiévale (1994)
- Hugh Capet et les premiers Capétiens (2002)
- Arcana imperii, Recueil d'articles (2003)
- Saint Martin, apôtre des pauvres (2008)
- Arcana imperii, II (2010)
- Arcana imperii, III (2010)
