= Luigi Farci =

Italian field hockey player (1939–2023)

Personal information
- Born: 20 March 1939 Cagliari, Italy
- Died: 11 August 2023 (aged 84) Cagliari, Italy

Sport
- Sport: Field hockey

Luigi Farci (20 March 1939 – 11 August 2023) was an Italian field hockey player. He competed in the men's tournament at the 1960 Summer Olympics.

Farci died in Cagliari on 11 August 2023, at the age of 84.
