= Barry Thornton (footballer) =

Australian rules footballer (1940–2023)

Personal information
- Full name: Barry James Thornton
- Born: 4 July 1940
- Died: 25 August 2023 (aged 83)
- Original team: Maribyrnong
- Height: 180 cm (5 ft 11 in)
- Weight: 80 kg (176 lb)

Playing career^{1}
Years	Club	Games (Goals)
1959–1961	Footscray	22 (2)
- ^{1} Playing statistics correct to the end of 1961.

Barry James Thornton (4 July 1940 – 25 August 2023) was an Australian rules footballer who played for the Footscray Football Club in the Victorian Football League (VFL).
