= Pierre Cornette de Saint-Cyr =

French art dealer (1 January 1939 – 20 August 2023)

- Born: 1 January 1939; Meknes, Morocco
- Died: 20 August 2023 (aged 84); Saint-Tropez, France
- Occupation: Art dealer

Pierre Cornette de Saint-Cyr (1 January 1939 – 20 August 2023) was a French art dealer.

Cornette de Saint-Cyr was born on 1 January 1939, and died on 20 August 2023, at the age of 84.

== Publications ==
- Le Fur, Patrick; Souchaud, Pierre; Cornette de Saint Cyr, Pierre (2005). Monique Favière. Paris: Iconofolio. ISBN 978-2-35237-002-4.
- Wodrascka, Alain; Ruquier, Laurent; Cornette de Saint Cyr, Pierre (2005). Marie Laforêt: Arrêt sur images. Les géants de la chanson. Paris: Éditions Didier Carpentier. ISBN 978-2-84167-363-6.
- Cornette de Saint Cyr, Pierre; Cornette de Saint Cyr, Arnaud (2009). Profitez-en l'art est encore en vente libre. Paris: Éditions Buchet/Chastel. ISBN 978-2-283-02429-4.
- Cornette de Saint Cyr, Pierre (2010). Le musée le plus cher du monde. Paris: Éditions de la Martinière. ISBN 978-2-7324-4321-8.
- Cornette de Saint Cyr, Pierre (2004). L'art, c'est la vie. Paris: Michel Lafon. ISBN 978-2-7499-0053-7.
