= Yozo Fujita =

Japanese politician (1942–2023)

- 藤田 陽三

Mayor of Chikushino
- In office 1 February 2011 – 31 January 2023
- Preceded by: Shiro Hirahara
- Succeeded by: Ichizo Hirai

Member of the Fukuoka Prefectural Assembly
- In office November 1991 – December 2010
- Constituency: Chikushino City

Personal details
- Born: 20 February 1942 Chikushino, Japan
- Died: 1 August 2023 (aged 81)
- Party: Liberal Democratic
- Education: Fukuoka Prefectural Shuyukan High School
- Occupation: Plasterer

Yozo Fujita (Japanese: 藤田陽三 Fujita Yōzō; 20 February 1942 – 1 August 2023) was a Japanese plasterer and politician. A member of the Liberal Democratic Party, he served as mayor of Chikushino from 2011 to 2023.

Fujita died on 1 August 2023, at the age of 81.
