= Barbara Borchardt =

German politician (1956–2023)

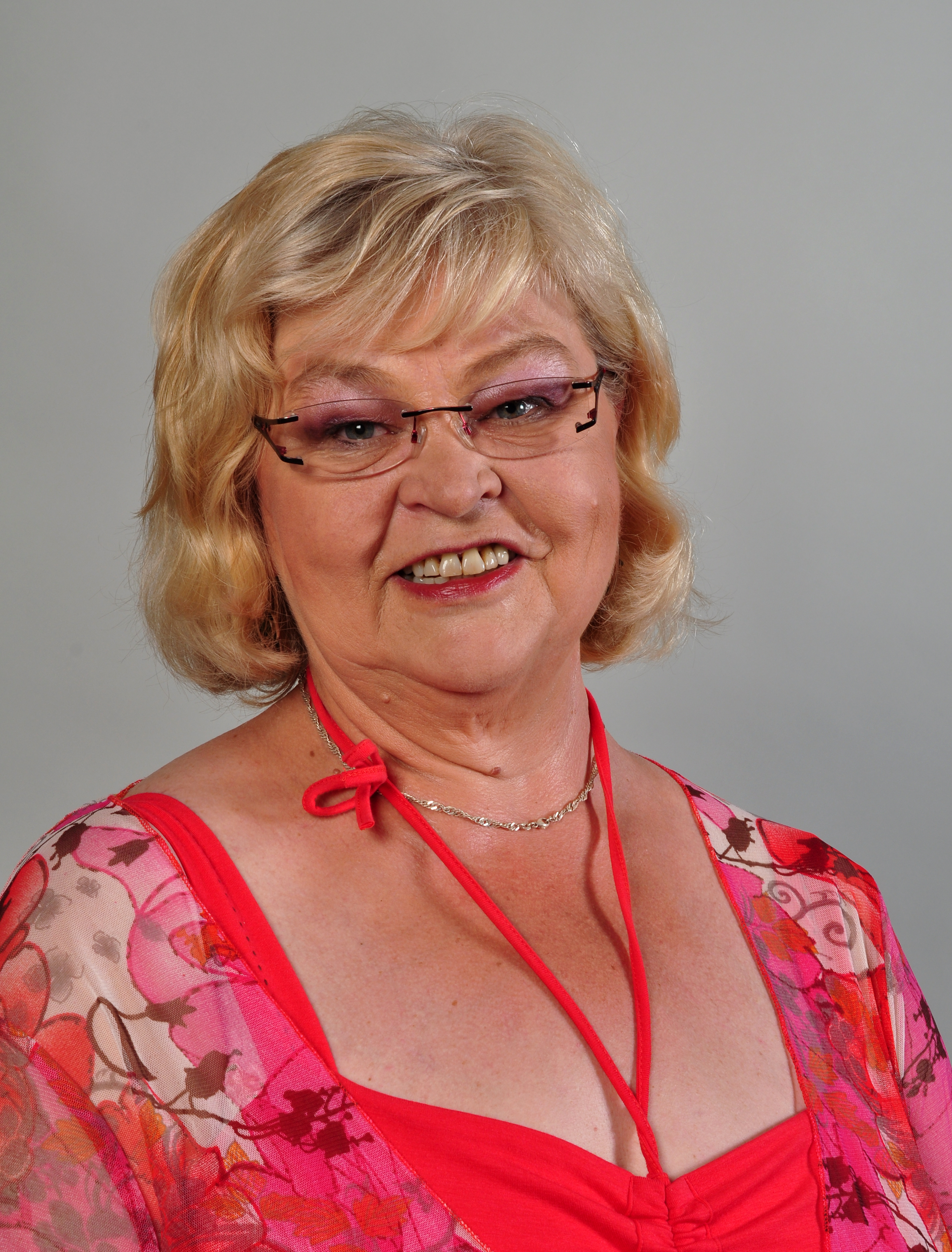
- Borchardt in 2013

Member of the Landtag of Mecklenburg-Vorpommern
- In office 26 October 1998 – 22 September 2002
- In office 2 December 2004 – 4 September 2016

Personal details
- Born: 26 March 1956 Altentreptow, East Germany
- Died: 11 August 2023 (aged 67)
- Party: PDS; The Left

Barbara Borchardt (26 March 1956 – 11 August 2023) was a German politician. A member of the Party of Democratic Socialism and The Left, she served in the Landtag of Mecklenburg-Vorpommern from 1998 to 2002 and again from 2004 to 2016.

Borchardt died on 11 August 2023, at the age of 67.
