= Adrienne Vaughan =

American businesswoman and publisher (1977/1978–2023)

- Born: February 2, 1978; United States
- Died: August 3, 2023 (aged 45); Fiordo di Furore, Amalfi Coast, Italy
- Cause of death: Injuries sustained in a boating collision
- Citizenship: American
- Education: College of William & Mary (BBA); New York University Stern School of Business (MBA)
- Occupation: Publishing executive
- Years active: 2000–2023
- Employer(s): Scholastic Corporation; The Walt Disney Company; Little Pim; Oxford University Press; Trustbridge Partners; Bloomsbury Publishing
- Title: President, Bloomsbury USA
- Term: 2021–2023
- Predecessor: Cindy Loh
- Spouse: Mike White
- Children: 2

Adrienne Vaughan (February 2, 1978 – August 3, 2023) was an American businesswoman and publishing house executive who was the President of publishing house Bloomsbury USA. She also worked for Disney, where one of her projects was managing Marvel Press.

Vaughan died in a boating incident in the Fiordo di Furore (Furore Fjord) at the Amalfi Coast on August 3, 2023, while on vacation with her family. Her children were uninjured, though her husband, Mike White, sustained injuries from the incident.

== Education and early career ==
Vaughan graduated from the College of William and Mary with a Bachelor's of Business Administration in 2000 and went to work for Scholastic. From 2001 through 2007 she held several positions with Scholastic, including operations analyst, global supply planner, and manager of planning and analysis.

She graduated NYU's Stern School of Business with an MBA in 2007 and went to work for Disney as a senior finance manager.

== Career ==
In February 2008, Vaughan became a director of finance at Disney in February 2008 and remained there until February 2013.

After leaving Disney, she worked as the Vice President of finance and operations at Little Pim, a startup publisher of electronic learning resources, from April 2013 through May 2014. She then went to work at Oxford University Press in May 2014 as the director of finance where she remained until June 2015. She then returned to Disney in June 2015 as the deputy director of Publishing for Disney Book Group. While with Disney, one of her projects was managing Marvel Press. She left Disney once more in October 2018 to be an independent consultant, a position she held until she signed on with Trustbridge Partners as senior VP in September 2019. During her tenure there, she was senior VP responsible for design and integration. She stayed with Trustbridge until August 2020.

Vaughan joined Bloomsbury USA in September 2020 as the chief operations officer and executive director. She became president of Bloomsbury USA in September 2021, after having taken responsibility for Bloomsbury's publishing operation in February 2021. She had assumed the duties of Publishing Director for the company after the departure of Cindy Loh in February 2021. Before taking over as president, Bloomsbury reported an increase of 14% in revenue during Vaughan's tenure as COO. At the time, the Bloomsbury USA market accounted for 29% of the company's total revenue. During Vaughan's tenure as president of Bloomsbury USA, the American market became the largest for the company's sales.

Vaughan also sat on the diversity, equity, and inclusion committee of the Association of American Publishers, of which she was a founding member. One of the policies she discussed at 2023's AAP meeting centered on censorship and how important it is for publishers to be proactive in combating it, something on which she also worked with PEN America. She also focused on emerging opportunities for publishers in higher learning and the scholarly and trade sectors.

== Personal life and death ==
Since 2013, Vaughan lived in Glen Rock, New Jersey.

While on vacation in Italy in August 2023, Vaughan and her family chartered a 29-foot speedboat at Amalfi, near Salerno. The pilot of the speedboat collided with a 130-foot sailing yacht, the Tortuga. A wedding party including 85 American and German tourists was aboard the yacht.

In the collision, Vaughan was thrown from the smaller vessel into the water between the hulls of both ships and fatally struck by the speedboat's propeller. Her husband, Mike White, suffered a dislocated shoulder and lacerations. A witness to the collision, who was aboard the Tortuga, reported that the vessels had been sailing without incident when suddenly the smaller vessel turned 180 degrees and collided with the yacht. Air ambulances arrived at the port at 7 PM local time to transfer Vaughan to a helicopter for transport to the hospital, but she had already died.

The pilot was transported to Ruggi d'Aragona in Salerno and tested positive for cocaine and alcohol use. He plead guilty to manslaughter.

=== Scholarship ===
Shortly after Vaughan's death, a donation-based scholarship was established in her name by former William and Mary classmates. The scholarship was established to provide need-based financial support to qualifying New Hampshire students.
