= Serhii Slabenko =

Ukrainian politician (1965–2023)

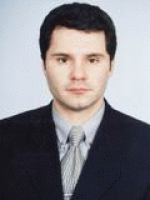
- Slabenko in 2002

People's Deputy of Ukraine
- In office 14 May 2002 – 25 May 2006
- Constituency: Electoral district #19

Personal details
- Born: Serhii Ivanovych Slabenko; 28 August 1965 Lutsk, Ukrainian SSR, USSR
- Died: 4 August 2023 (aged 57) Zaporizhzhia Oblast, Ukraine
- Party: People's Union "Our Ukraine"
- Education: Kurgan Higher Military-Political Aviation School; Interregional Academy of Personnel Management
- Occupation: Engineer

Serhii Ivanovych Slabenko (Ukrainian: Сергій Іванович Слабенко; 28 August 1965 – 4 August 2023) was a Ukrainian engineer, soldier and politician.

A member of People's Union "Our Ukraine", he served in the Verkhovna Rada from 2002 to 2006.

Slabenko died during the Russian invasion of Ukraine in Zaporizhzhia Oblast on 4 August 2023, at the age of 57.
