= John Quenby =

- Born: 30 October 1941
- Died: 29 August 2023 (aged 81)
- Education: Bedford Modern School

John Richard Quenby (30 October 1941 – 29 August 2023) was a British motorsport administrator who was Chief Executive of the RAC Motor Sports Association (1990–2001), the official governing body of motorsport in the United Kingdom. He was also director of the Auto-Cycle Union (1995–1998), Chairman of the Speedway Control Board (1998–2002) and of the Motorcycle Circuit Racing Control Board (1995–2000).

== Biography ==
Educated at Bedford Modern School and the Open University, Quenby started his business career with Granada plc becoming managing director of Granada Overseas Holdings Limited and holding numerous other directorships at subsidiary companies of Granada. In 1990 he became Chief Executive of the RAC Motor Sports Association, the official governing body of motorsport in the United Kingdom, a position he held until 2001. He was also a director of the Auto-Cycle Union (1995–98), Chairman of the Speedway Control Board (1998–2002) and former Chairman of the Motorcycle Circuit Racing Control Board (1995–2000). After his retirement, Quenby was the branch Chairman of the Royal British Legion and Chairman of the Friends of the Intelligence Corps Museum since 2011. He was a member of the MCC and the RAC Club.

Quenby died from cancer in August 2023, at the age of 81.
