= Sze Hong Chew =

Singaporean news anchor (1959–2023)

- Born: 1959; State of Singapore
- Died: 20 August 2023 (aged 64)
- Other names: Shi Hongzhou
- Occupations: News anchor; corporate trainer
- Years active: 1990s–2023
- Spouse: Cai Peiying (m. 1987)
- Children: 3

Chinese name
- Chinese: 施宏洲
- Hanyu Pinyin: Shī Hóngzhōu

Sze Hong Chew (1959 – 20 August 2023) was a Singaporean television news presenter and corporate trainer.

== Early life and career ==
Sze graduated from the National University of Singapore, majoring in Chinese studies. He began his career in broadcasting at the Singapore Broadcasting Corporation in the 1990s, and later left to join the corporate sector as a trainer. He was the principal consultant at Success Horizon Consultancy, a business solutions firm, and had set up the learning institute Human Capital Singapore (HCS中文学院). He also co-founded the association Bosses Network (老板联谊会) in 1996 and sat on the 46th board of the Singapore Buddhist Lodge.

== Personal life and death ==
Sze married Cai Peiying in 1987, and had two daughters and a son.

In January 2020, Sze started medical treatment after a colonoscopy revealed that he had colorectal cancer. He died on 20 August 2023, at the age of 64. His wake was held at the Singapore Casket from 21 August to 24 August. He was cremated at the Mandai Crematorium and Columbarium on 24 August.
