= Pierre Court =

French hockey player (1933–2023)

Personal information
- Nationality: French
- Born: 31 March 1933 Montrouge, France
- Died: 29 August 2023 (aged 90) Paris, France

Sport
- Sport: Field hockey

Pierre Jean Robert Court (31 March 1933 – 29 August 2023) was a French field hockey player. He competed in the men's tournament at the 1960 Summer Olympics. Court died in Paris on 29 August 2023, at the age of 90.
