= Irma Brenman Pick =

South African-British psychologist and psychoanalyst (1934–2023)

- Born: 13 April 1934; South Africa
- Died: 3 August 2023 (aged 89)
- Education: University of the Witwatersrand
- Scientific career
- Fields: Psychotherapy, Clinical psychology
- Workplaces: Institute of Psychoanalysis

Irma Brenman Pick (13 April 1934 – 3 August 2023) was a South African-born British psychologist and psychoanalyst known for her work on countertransference. She served as the president of the British Psychoanalytical Society from 1997 to 2000.

== Early life ==
Brenman Pick was born on 13 April 1934 in South Africa to Min and Joseph Leif, Jewish emigres from Latvia. She initially planned to pursue further training to become a nursery teacher. But she chose to continue her education to the university level when she was encouraged to do so by the woman who interviewed her prior to entering the nursery teaching training program. Later, Brenman Pick attended the University of the Witwatersrand in Johannesburg and academically excelled in her chosen major, social science.

== Career ==
Brenman Pick joined the Tavistock Clinic to train as a child psychotherapist when she moved to London with her first husband in 1955. She continued her education and practice there until 1960 when she started adult psychotherapy training as well as additional instruction in child psychotherapy at the Institute of Psychoanalysis. Throughout her years of practice, she was influenced by the work of Melanie Klein, Wilfred Bion, and Herbert Rosenfeld. She served as the president of the British Psychoanalytical Society from 1997 to 2000 and also occupied the position of the Chair of the Student Progress and Education Committees and of the International Psychoanalytical Association’s Committee on Psychoanalytic Education.

== Personal life and death ==
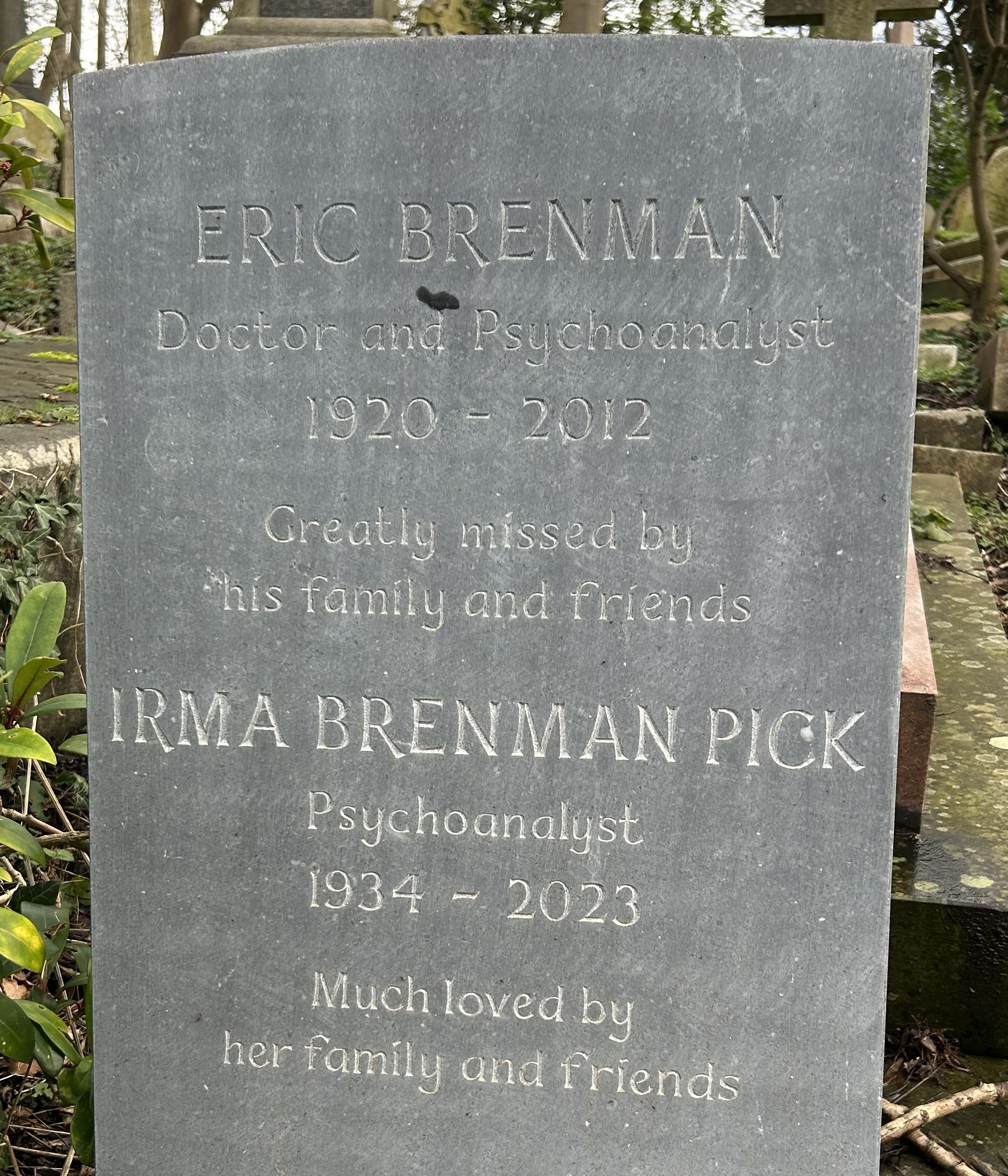
Grave of Irma Brenman Pick in Highgate Cemetery

When Brenman Pick was 20 years old, she married Abe Pick, a doctor, in South Africa. They had a son, Daniel Pick, born in 1960. In 1961, Abe Pick died at the age of 35. In 1975, Pick re-married, this time to a fellow psychoanalyst, Eric Brenman, who died in 2012.

Irma Brenman Pick died of lung cancer on 3 August 2023, at the age of 89. Her ashes were later interred in her husband's grave in Highgate Cemetery.

== Selected works ==
- Pick, I. B. (1985). Male sexuality: A clinical study of forces that impede development. International Journal of Psychoanalysis. 66:415-422.
- Pick, I. B. (1985). Working through in the countertransference. International Journal of Psychoanalysis. 66:157-166.
- Pick, I. B. (1988). Adolescence: its impact on patient and analyst. International Review of Psychoanalysis. 15:187-194.
- Pick, I. B. (2018). Authenticity in the Psychoanalytic Encounter: The Work of Irma Brenman Pick. London: Routledge.
