= Michael Dilley (English cricketer) =

English cricketer (1939–2023)

Personal information
- Full name: Michael Reginald Dilley
- Born: 28 March 1939; Rushden, Northamptonshire, England
- Died: 19 August 2023 (aged 84)
- Nickname: Tex
- Batting: Right-handed
- Bowling: Right-arm fast-medium

Domestic team information
- Years: Team
- 1957 to 1963: Northamptonshire

Career statistics
Competition	FC	LA
Matches	33	1
Runs scored	232	–
Batting average	10.54	–
100s/50s	0/0	–
Top score	31*	–
Balls bowled	5,285	84
Wickets	80	2
Bowling average	30.88	12.00
5 wickets in innings	2	0
10 wickets in match	0	–
Best bowling	6/74	2/24
Catches/stumpings	13/–	0/–
- Source: Cricinfo, 26 August 2023

Michael Reginald Dilley (28 March 1939 – 19 August 2023) was an English cricketer who played for Northamptonshire from 1957 to 1963.

Dilley was born in Rushden, Northamptonshire. He appeared in 33 first-class matches as a right-arm fast-medium bowler and right-handed lower-order batsman. He took 80 wickets with a best performance of six for 74 against Sussex, including a hat-trick, in 1961; he had also claimed a hat-trick six weeks earlier, against Nottinghamshire.

After he left Northamptonshire, Dilley led Rushden Town to three titles and Irthlingborough to two in the Northamptonshire County League. He ran a garden centre in Northamptonshire.

Dilley died on 19 August 2023, at the age of 84.
