= Rogelio Canches =

Peruvian politician (1953–2023)

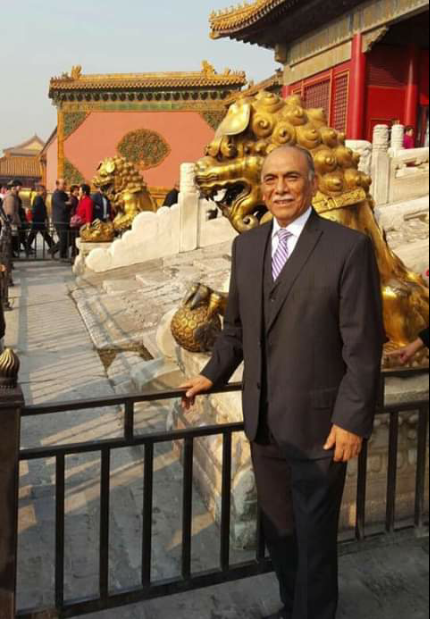

Rogelio Canches (14 September 1953 – 8 August 2023) was a Peruvian politician. He served as a deputy from 2011 to 2016.

Canches died on 8 August 2023, at the age of 69.
