= Death of Vwaere Diaso =

Nigerian casualty

On August 1, 2023, an elevator carrying Dr. Vwaere Diaso crashed from the 10th floor to the ground floor of Lagos Island General Hospital where she worked as medical house officer. Diaso died from injuries sustained after she was trapped for more than 40 minutes in the crashed elevator. She died a few weeks prior to the completion of her housemanship.

== Background and incident ==
Diaso was a native of Ewu Kingdom in Ughelli South Local Government Area of Delta State. She was a graduate of Babcock University.

About 7:10pm on August 1, 2023, Diaso, a medical house officer, took the elevator to pick up a food delivery from a dispatch rider. Moments later a loud crash was heard from the accounts of Dr. Moye who was standing in front of the elevator and Dr. Olumide who was using the stairs. While trapped and crying for help within the elevator, the company maintaining the elevator and the fire service were called but neither came to the site of the incidence. After about 40 minutes, the door was dismantled to get Diaso out. Dr. Moye said:

She was lying in between the base of the elevator and the ground floor with the engine hanging over her head below the ground floor with blood on broken glasses and fractured limbs.

As they rushed to resuscitate her, rescuers found out that there was no blood available for urgent transfusion in the hospital.

== Reactions ==
Reports show that there were several requests by the doctors to fix the faulty elevator years before the incident and the promises made to fulfil them were not met.

On August 2, The Lagos branch of the Nigerian Medical Association called an indefinite strike for medical doctors in three government hospitals on Lagos Island over Diaso's death and directed doctors in other government hospitals in the state to scale down activities. They also announced a 5-day mourning. On the same day, the Lagos State government set up an inquiry team to investigate the elevator accident.

On August 4, the Lagos State Civil Service Chapter of the Association of Medical Laboratory Scientists of Nigeria (AMLSN) denied any request for blood for Diaso in an attempt to refute the unavailability of blood transfusion service as the cause of her death.
