= Hugo Alberto Mott =

Argentine politician (1928–2023)

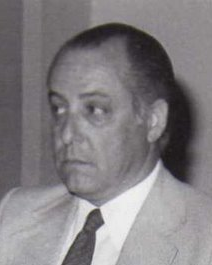

Governor of Catamarca Province
- In office 25 May 1973 – 24 March 1976
- Preceded by: Horacio Agustín Pernasetti (de facto)
- Succeeded by: Alberto Carlos Lucena (de facto)

Personal details
- Born: 1928; Tinogasta, Catamarca, Argentina
- Died: 25 August 2023 (aged 94–95)
- Political party: PJ
- Occupation: Doctor

Hugo Alberto Mott (1928 – 25 August 2023) was an Argentine doctor and politician. A member of the Justicialist Party, he served as governor of Catamarca Province from 1973 to 1976.

Mott died on 25 August 2023.
