= Jim Hendry (cyclist) =

English racing cyclist (1939–2023)

Personal information
- Full name: James David Hendry
- Born: 10 October 1939
- Died: 20 August 2023 (aged 83)

Cycling career
- Sport: Cycling
- Discipline: Road
- Role: Rider

Professional team
- 1966: Mottram Cycles

James David Hendry MBE (10 October 1939 – 20 August 2023) was an English professional cyclist who rode between 1965 and 1969. Hendry began coaching in the 1960s before holding several voluntary management and coaching positions. He became British Cycling's Director of Racing in 1979 and was responsible for the selection and Management of Great Britain cycling teams. He was appointed British Cycling's Chief Executive in 1988 and was later general secretary. Hendry was made an MBE for his services to cycling in the Queen's Birthday Honours in 2007. He was British Cycling's honorary archivist. Hendry died on 20 August 2023, at the age of 83.
