= Mikhail Pokpov =

Soviet-Russian military officer and politician (1924–2023)

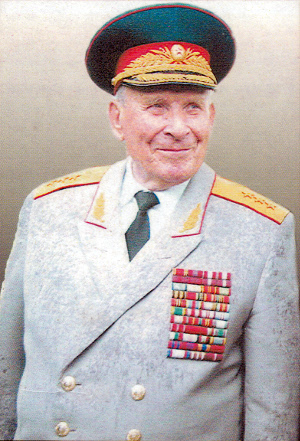
- Pokpov in 2013

Member of the Soviet of Nationalities for the Nakhichevan ASSR
- In office 1984–1989

Personal details
- Born: Mikhail Danilovich Pokpov; 14 November 1924 Ostapova-Sloboda, Meshchovsky Uyezd, Kaluga Governorate, Russian SFSR, USSR
- Died: 23 August 2023 (aged 98) Moscow, Russia
- Party: CPSU
- Education: Lenin Military-Political Academy; Military Academy of the General Staff of the USSR Armed Forces
- Occupation: Military officer

Mikhail Danilovich Pokpov (Russian: Михаил Данилович Попков; 14 November 1924 – 23 August 2023) was a Soviet-Russian military officer and politician. A member of the Communist Party, he served in the Soviet of Nationalities from 1984 to 1989. Awarded the Order of the Red Star (1944).

Mikhail was born on November 14, 1924 in the village of Astapova-Sloboda, Yukhnovsky District, Kaluga Oblast.

Pokpov died in Moscow on 23 August 2023, at the age of 98.

== Family ==
Father – Daniil Filippovich Popkov (1899–1943). Mother – Tatyana Ivanovna Popkova (1900–1987). Brothers – Victor Danilovich Popkov (1932–1989), Nikolai Danilovich Popkov.
