= Vlad Marcoci =

Romanian politician (1968–2023)

Member of the Chamber of Deputies of Romania
- In office 12 December 2012 – 10 December 2016
- Constituency: Electoral district no. 29 Neamț

Personal details
- Born: 1 February 1968 Piatra Neamț, Romania
- Died: 10 August 2023 (aged 55) Bicaz, Romania
- Party: PSD
- Education: Technical University of Civil Engineering of Bucharest

Vlad Marcoci (1 February 1968 – 10 August 2023) was a Romanian politician. A member of the Social Democratic Party, he served in the Chamber of Deputies from 2012 to 2016.

Marcoci died of cardiac arrest in Bicaz on 10 August 2023, at the age of 55.
