= Parris H. Chang =

Taiwanese scholar and politician (1936–2023)

- 張旭成
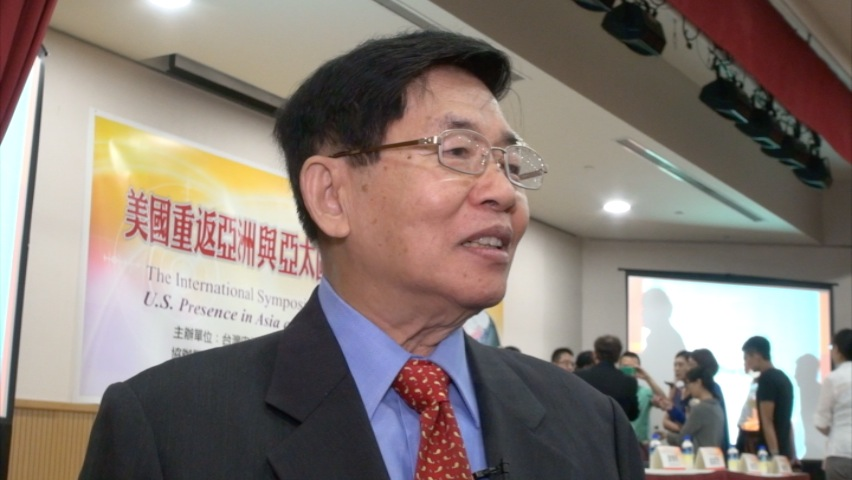
- Chang in 2014

Member of the Legislative Yuan
- In office 1 February 1993 – 31 January 2005
- Constituency: Overseas Constituency

Personal details
- Born: 30 December 1936 Tainan Prefecture, Taiwan
- Died: 26 August 2023 (aged 86) Taiwan
- Party: Democratic Progressive Party
- Education: National Taiwan University (BA); Washington State University (MA); Columbia University (PhD)
- Profession: Political scientist

Chang Hsu-cheng (Chinese: 張旭成; 30 December 1936 – 26 August 2023), also known by his English name Parris Chang, was a Taiwanese political scientist and politician. A member of the Democratic Progressive Party, he served in the Legislative Yuan from 1993 to 2005. He was also a professor of political science at Pennsylvania State University.

== Education ==
Chang graduated from National Taiwan University with a bachelor's degree in political science in 1959. He then completed graduate studies in the United States, where he earned a master's degree in political science from Washington State University in 1963 and his Ph.D. in political science from Columbia University in 1969. His doctoral dissertation was titled, "Patterns and processes of policy-making in Communist China, 1955–1962: three case studies".

== Death ==
Chang died in Taiwan on 26 August 2023, at the age of 86.
