= Eugeniusz Patyk =

Polish politician (1937–2023)

Member of the Senate of Poland
- In office 19 September 1993 – 20 October 1997

Personal details
- Born: Eugeniusz Jan Patyk; 29 July 1937 Brześć Kujawski, Poland
- Died: 23 August 2023 (aged 86)
- Party: SLD
- Education: University of Opole
- Occupation: Schoolteacher

Eugeniusz Jan Patyk (29 July 1937 – 23 August 2023) was a Polish schoolteacher and politician. A member of the Democratic Left Alliance, he served in the Senate from 1993 to 1997.

Patyk died on 23 August 2023, at the age of 86.
