= James Charles Nakhwanga Osogo =

Kenyan politician (1932–2023)

James Charles Nakhwanga Osogo (10 October 1932 – 15 August 2023) was a Kenyan politician.

== Early life and education ==
James Charles Nakhwanga Osogo was born on 10 October 1932, in Bukani Village of Bunyala subcounty, Budalangi Constituency in Kenya. He attended Port Victoria Primary from 1941 to 1943 before proceeding to St. Mary's Secondary School, Yala from 1944 to 1949. He later attended Railways Training School, Nairobi from 1950 to 1951.

== Career ==
Nakhwanga Osogo qualified as assistant station master; 1951–1953 assistant station master Kenya and Uganda; 1953–1954 Kagumo Teacher's Training College P2 certificate; 1955–1959 teacher at various schools in Kenya; 1960 headmaster Kibasanga School; 1961 headmaster Nangina School; 1963 elected Member House of Representatives for Ruwambwa.

He served in several cabinet posts, including Assistant Minister for Agriculture (1964-1966), Minister for Information and Broadcasting (1966-1969), Minister for Commerce and Industry (1969-1973), Minister for Local Government (1973-1974), Minister for Health (1974), Minister for Agriculture (1979) and Minister for Livestock (1980).

Nakhwanga Osogo was awarded the Elder, Order of the Golden Heart (Kenya), the Grand Cordon of the Star of Ethiopia, the Order of the Star of Africa (Liberia), and the Grand Cross of the Star Yugoslav Flag (1st Class).

== Death ==
Nakhwanga Osogo died in Kisumu on 15 August 2023, at the age of 90.
