= Michael Auditor =

German politician (1942–2023)

Member of the Landtag of Lower Saxony
- In office 21 June 1978 – 20 June 1994

Personal details
- Born: 18 December 1942 Breslau, Germany
- Died: 12 August 2023 (aged 80)
- Party: SPD

Michael Auditor (18 December 1942 – 12 August 2023) was a German politician. A member of the Social Democratic Party, he served in the Landtag of Lower Saxony from 1978 to 1994.

Auditor died on 12 August 2023, at the age of 80.
