= Vera Dedanwala =

German politician (1943–2023)

Member of the Landtag of North Rhine-Westphalia
- In office 31 May 1990 – 2 June 2005

Personal details
- Born: 7 August 1943 Radevormwald, Germany
- Died: 7 August 2023 (aged 80)
- Party: SPD
- Education: Pädagogische Hochschule in Wuppertal
- Occupation: Schoolteacher

Vera Dedanwala (7 August 1943 – 7 August 2023) was a German schoolteacher and politician. A member of the Social Democratic Party, she served in the Landtag of North Rhine-Westphalia from 1990 to 2005.

Dedanwala died on 7 August 2023, her 80th birthday.
