= Stelios Koiliaris =

Cypriot politician (1951–2023)

Minister of Commerce and Industry
- In office 28 February 1993 – 27 October 1994
- Preceded by: George Syrimis
- Succeeded by: position abolished

Minister of Commerce, Industry and Tourism
- In office 27 October 1994 – 27 April 1995
- Preceded by: position established
- Succeeded by: Kyriakos Christofi

Personal details
- Born: 1951 Nicosia, British Cyprus
- Died: 16 August 2023 (aged 72)
- Education: National and Kapodistrian University of Athens; University of Essex
- Occupation: Financial manager

Stelios Koiliaris (Greek: Στέλιος Κοιλιάρης; 1951 – 16 August 2023) was a Cypriot financial manager and politician. He served as Minister of Commerce and Industry from 1993 to 1994 and as Minister of Commerce, Industry and Tourism from 1994 to 1995.

Koiliaris died on 16 August 2023, at the age of 72.
