= Barry Durrant-Peatfield =

British doctor (1936–2023)

- Born: November 1936
- Died: 27 August 2023 (aged 86)
- Medical career
- Sub-specialties: Metabolic disorders

Barry John Durrant-Peatfield (November 1936 – 27 August 2023) was a British medical practitioner specialising in metabolic disorders namely, hypothyroidism.

Durrant-Peatfield submitted to voluntary erasure from the medical register as an alternative to having his license suspended for the use of unapproved diagnostic tests and treatments such as whole thyroid extracts (NDT). Although controversial, NDT has been used for the treatment of hypothyroidism since 1800s to great effect, and still remains an effective treatment today in some patients with hypothyroidism that do not respond well to T4 monotherapy. Figures such as Hillary Clinton and Oprah are said to take NDT for their hypothyroidism. Many patients who saw Dr Peatfield credit their recovery with his strength of character to treat patients both holistically and with common sense in spite of pressures from his peers to keep patients on T4 monotherapy who saw no symptom improvement.

== Career ==
Durrant-Peatfield obtained his medical degrees at Guy's Hospital London, in 1960 and worked for two years at Croydon University Hospital before entering general practice. His emphasis on the use of unverified diagnostic techniques, for both thyroid and adrenal problems, brought him into conflict with establishment medicine in spite of his treatment bringing about much success for many suffering with chronic issues that could not be resolved under standard care practices.

Durrant-Peatfield trained at the Broda Otto Barnes Institute (Connecticut, United States), later returning to the United Kingdom to open his own clinic.

== Controversy ==
In May 2001 Durrant-Peatfield was called before an Interim Orders Committee and subsequently suspended from practising medicine in the United Kingdom for 18 months for offering what the General Medical Council (GMC) described as "controversial treatments" for Chronic fatigue syndrome and fibromyalgia patients presenting with what he believed to be undiagnosed hypothyroidism. Durrant-Peatfield was voluntarily erased from the register, bringing the case to a close. After this time he ran a highly successful, private clinic where he guided over 25,000 patients towards restored euthyroidism via use of NDT, adrenal glandular and lifestyle modifications. He remained a significant figure in hypothyroid communities, representing hope and leaving a fountain of knowledge behind in his books for despairing hypothyroid patients who remain unwell on T4 monotherapy and even those who struggle to get a diagnosis.

== Death ==
Barry Durrant-Peatfield died on 27 August 2023, at the age of 86.

== Bibliography ==
- Barry Durrant-Peatfield (2006). Your Thyroid and How to Keep It Healthy. Hammersmith Press Limited. ISBN 1-905140-10-X.
- Barry Durrant-Peatfield (2002). The Great Thyroid Scandal and how to Survive It. London: Barons Down Publishing. ISBN 0-9544203-0-6.
