= Yevgeny Golubovsky =

Soviet and Ukrainian journalist and writer (1936–2023)

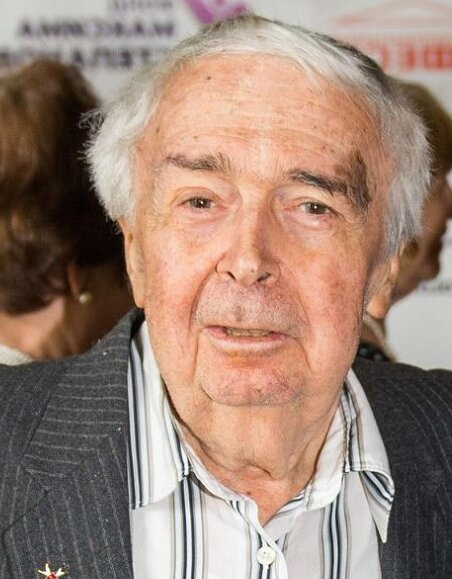
- Golubovsky in 2018
- Born: 5 December 1936; Odesa, Ukrainian SSR, Soviet Union
- Died: 6 August 2023 (aged 86); Odesa, Ukraine
- Years active: 1965–2023
- Spouse: Valentina Stepanovna Golubovskaya (1939–2018)
- Children: 1
- Awards: Odesa Golden Pen

Yevgeny Mikhailovich Golubovsky (Russian: Евге́ний Миха́йлович Голубо́вский; Ukrainian: Євген Михайлович Голубовський, romanized: Yevhen Mykhailovych Holubovskyi; 5 December 1936 – 6 August 2023) was a Soviet and Ukrainian journalist and culturologist. He was editor of the newspaper World Odessa News, deputy editor of the almanac Deribasovskaya-Rishelievskaya, vice-president of the World Club of Odesa residents, compiler, commentator, author of forewords for more than twenty books, and chairman of the Public Council of the Museum of Contemporary Art in Odesa.

== Life and career ==
Yevgeny Golubovsky was born in Odesa on 5 December 1936. He graduated from the Odesa Polytechnic Institute, where in 1956 he arranged a debate evening with his friends on art from impressionism to cubism, which was perceived by the authorities, as an action against the official art of socialist realism. Only the intervention of Ilya Ehrenburg and Boris Polevoy saved him from being expelled from the institute.

After working for several years as an engineer, he went into journalism related to the culture and history of Odesa. Published in magazines in Russia, Ukraine, USA, Israel. Member of the National Union of Journalists of Ukraine.

In 1990, he founded the newspaper of the World Club of Odessans World Odesa News, where he also worked as an editor. Since 2000, he has been the deputy editor of the literary and artistic almanac Deribasovskaya-Rishelievskaya.

In September 2022, Golubovsky became the Honorary Citizen of Odesa.

Yevgeny Golubovsky died on 6 August 2023, at the age of 86.

== Bibliography ==
- Field — Ehrenburg. From correspondence (1986)
- Black Square over the Black Sea: Materials for the History of the Avant-garde art of Odesa. XX century (with Tatiana Shchurova and Olga Botushanskaya; 2001)
- Yuri Egorov's sea (2005)
- Loyalty to the Odesa Brotherhood (2012)
- True Poetic Nobility (2014)
- Karakis's City Guide (2016)
- Looking from Bolshaya Arnautskaya (2016)
