= Simon Tuckey =

British barrister and judge (1941–2023)

Sir Simon Lane Tuckey (17 October 1941 – 8 August 2023) was a Rhodesia-born British barrister and judge. He was a Lord Justice of Appeal from 1998 to 2008.

== Biography ==
Simon Lane Tuckey was born on 17 October 1941. He grew up in Southern Rhodesia (now Zimbabwe) and was educated at the Plumtree School. Tuckey was called to the English Bar by Lincoln's Inn in 1964 and practiced from 4 Pump Court, mainly in commercial law. He was appointed a Queen's Counsel in 1981 and was a Recorder from 1984 to 1992. Tuckey became a Bencher of Lincoln's Inn in 1989.

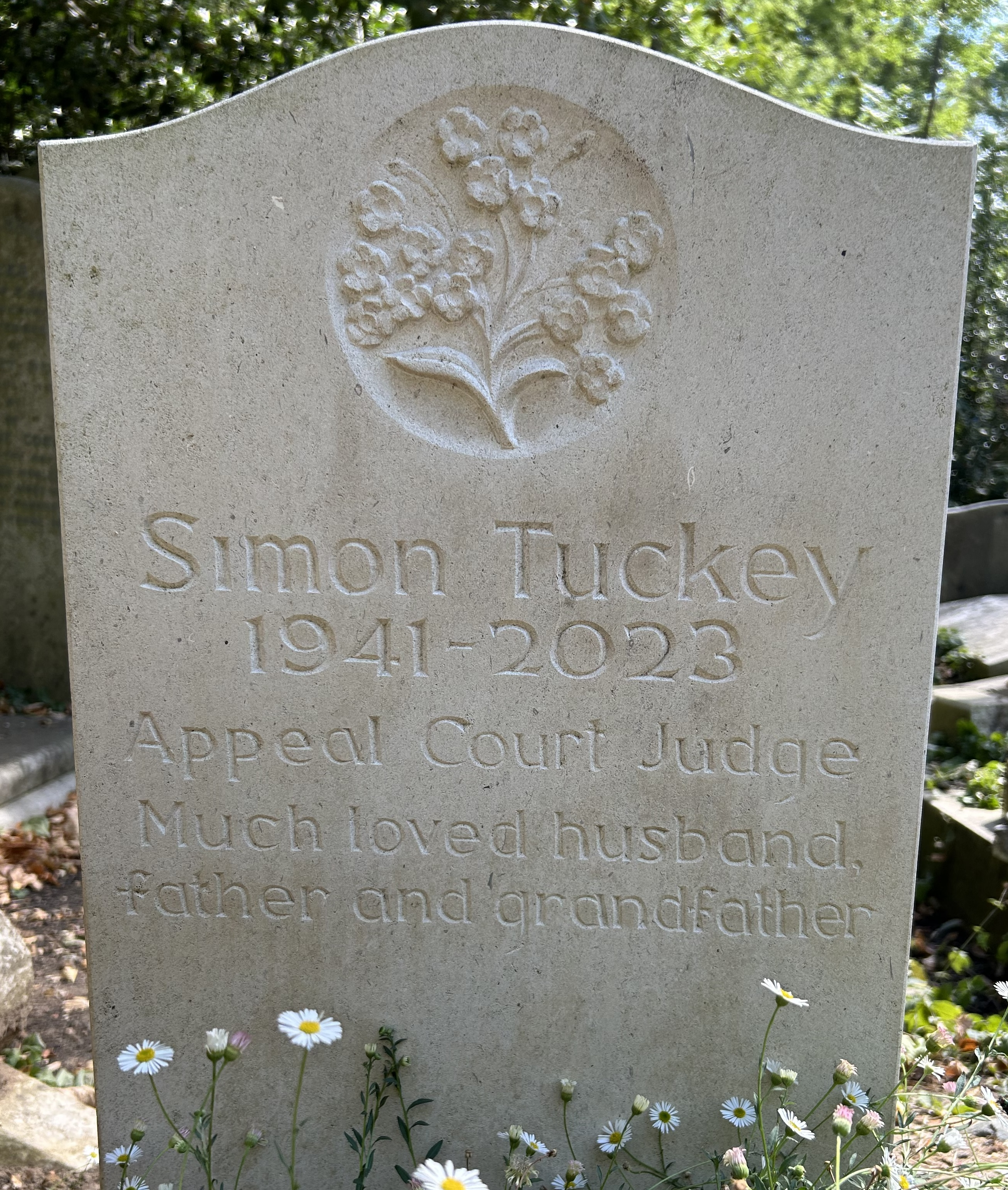
Grave of Simon Tuckey in Highgate Cemetery

Tuckey was appointed a Justice of the High Court in 1992, receiving the customary knighthood. Assigned to the Queen's Bench Division, he was a judge of the Employment Appeal Tribunal from 1993 to 1998, Presiding Judge of the Western Circuit from 1995 to 1997, and Judge in Charge of the Commercial List from 1997 to 1998. In 1998, he was made a Lord Justice of Appeal and sworn of the Privy Council. He retired in 2008.

After his retirement, Tuckey practiced as an international arbitrator and mediator. From 2010 to 2012 he was a Judge of Appeal for Gibraltar. Sir Simon Tuckey died on 8 August 2023, at the age of 81, and his ashes were buried in Highgate Cemetery.
