= Aharon Levran =

Israeli military personnel (died 2023)

- אהרן לברן
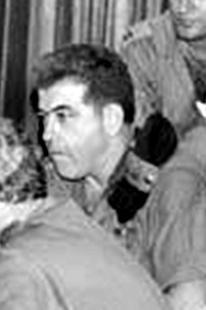
- Levran in 1973
- Born: 1932
- Died: 22 August 2023 (aged 90–91)
- Occupation: General

Aharon Levran (Hebrew: אהרן לברן; 1932 – 22 August 2023) was an Israeli general.

== Military career ==
In 1950, Levran was drafted into the IDF. He first served in the Armored Corps, where he completed an officers' course. When he served as deputy company commander in the 52nd Battalion (then a battalion in the 7th Brigade), it was decided to reduce the corps and he was transferred to command the patrol unit of the Givati Brigade. The brigade commander at the time was Haim Bar-Lev, later Chief of Staff.

Levran volunteered to participate in Operation Yarkon, taking place in June 1955. For his participation in the operation, he was awarded the Chief of Staff's Medal of Honor given to him by the Chief of Staff at the time, Moshe Dayan. In 1973, the decoration was changed to the exemplary decoration.
