= Takaharu Doi =

Japanese lawyer (1933–2023)

Prosecutor-General of Japan
- In office 16 January 1996 – 23 June 1998
- Preceded by: Yusuke Yoshinaga
- Succeeded by: Keisuke Kitajima

Personal details
- Born: 12 July 1933 Osaka, Japan
- Died: 1 August 2023 (aged 90)
- Education: Graduate School of Law and Faculty of Law, Kyoto University
- Occupation: Lawyer

Takaharu Doi (Japanese: 土肥孝治 Doi Takaharu; 12 July 1933 – 1 August 2023) was a Japanese lawyer. He served as Prosecutor-General of Japan from 1996 to 1998.

Doi died of heart failure on 1 August 2023, at the age of 90.
