= Edith Graef McGeer =

American neuroscientist (1923–2023)

- Born: Edith Graef; November 18, 1923; New York City, U.S.
- Died: August 28, 2023 (aged 99); Vancouver, British Columbia, Canada
- Education: University of Virginia; Swarthmore College
- Known for: Alzheimer's disease research
- Spouse: Patrick McGeer (died 2022)
- Children: 3
- Awards: Order of British Columbia, Fellow of the Royal Society of Canada, Order of Canada
- Scientific career
- Fields: Neuroscience
- Workplaces: DuPont; University of British Columbia

Edith Graef McGeer, OC OBC FRSC (November 18, 1923 – August 28, 2023) was an American-Canadian neuroscientist, best known for her work and contributions to the research of prevention and treatment of Alzheimer's and other neurodegenerative diseases. Edith McGeer, along with her husband and co-collaborator, Patrick McGeer, were recognized by the International Scientific Institute as one of the 100 most highly cited researchers in neuroscience. She was co-founder of Aurin Biotech, which is advancing the drug AUR1107 in pre-clinical trials and FDA approval as an anti-inflammatory treatment for Alzheimer's, muscular degenerative conditions and some cancers.

== Education ==
McGeer, who said that her interest in mathematics began when she was five, skipped grades at the St. Agatha's School for Girls. At 16 years old, she declared a chemistry major at Swarthmore College and was not met with encouragement from the head of the chemistry department, since science wasn't considered a fitting profession for a woman in 1940. Graduating Phi Beta Kappa, McGeer completed her doctorate in organic chemistry from the University of Virginia in two years.

== Career accomplishments and awards ==
McGeer was a research chemist for the DuPont Company and moved to Vancouver, British Columbia where she worked as a research assistant at the University of British Columbia Medical School and eventually received the title of Professor Emeritus. McGeer held 10 patents and contributed to 525 articles and was the recipient of a special award by the British Columbia Science Council for lifetime contribution.

McGeer is identified as one of the top 100 most highly cited neuroscientists. She was jointly appointed an Officer of the Order of Canada in 1995 and a Fellow of the Royal Society of Canada in 2001. She died on August 28, 2023, at the age of 99.
