= Francisc Tobă =

Romanian politician (1953–2023)

Member of the Chamber of Deputies of Romania
- In office 17 February 2021 – 15 August 2023
- Constituency: Electoral district no. 08 Brașov
- In office 22 October 1992 – 22 November 1996
- Constituency: Electoral district no. 33 Sibiu

Personal details
- Born: 23 June 1953 Deta, Romania
- Died: 15 August 2023 (aged 70)
- Party: PDSR; ApP
- Occupation: Military officer

Francisc Tobă (23 June 1953 – 15 August 2023) was a Romanian military officer and politician. A member of the Party of Social Democracy in Romania and later the Alliance for the Homeland, he served in the Chamber of Deputies from 1992 to 1996 and again from 2021 to 2023.

Tobă died on 15 August 2023, at the age of 70.
