= Faye Fantarrow =

English singer (2002–2023)

- Born: 28 April 2002
- Died: 26 August 2023 (aged 21)
- Occupation: singer
- Years active: 2021–2023

Faye Fantarrow (28 April 2002 – 26 August 2023) was an English singer and songwriter from Sunderland.

== Music ==
Fantarrow won the 2021 Lindisfarne's Alan Hull Award, and was signed to Dave Stewart's Bay Street Records. She performed on BBC Music Introducing in 2022. In February 2023 she released an EP called AWOL in collaboration with Stewart, and in June of the same year a music video for the track The Weekend.

== Death ==
Fantarrow was twice diagnosed with leukaemia as a child, and found out in August 2022 she had a rare and aggressive brain tumour. She died on 26 August 2023 at age of 21. Her funeral was on 21 September 2023 at Sunderland Minster, with hundreds of people attending.
