= Ray Enright (Canadian football) =

Canadian football player and murderer (1929–2023)

Profile
- Positions: Halfback, End

Personal information
- Born: June 15, 1929; Edmonton, Alberta, Canada
- Died: August 4, 2023 (aged 94); Kelowna, British Columbia, Canada
- Listed height: 6 ft 0 in (1.83 m)
- Listed weight: 190 lb (86 kg)

Career information
- College: North Dakota

Career history
- 1951–1953: Edmonton Eskimos
- 1954: BC Lions

Raymond Leo Enright (June 15, 1929 – August 4, 2023) was a Canadian professional football player who played for the BC Lions and Edmonton Eskimos. He played college football at the University of North Dakota.

In 1981, Enright was convicted of first-degree murder and sentenced to life in prison in the August 8, 1980, shooting death of Suzanne Meloche at a Calgary restaurant. Held at the William Head Institution, he was paroled in 2001. Enright died on August 4, 2023, at the age of 94.
