= Monica Van Kerrebroeck =

Belgian Catholic nun and politician (1939–2023)

Member of the Flemish Parliament
- In office 13 June 2004 – 6 July 2009

Personal details
- Born: 22 July 1939 Ghent, Belgium
- Died: 20 August 2023 (aged 84) Zaffelare, Belgium
- Party: CD&V
- Education: KU Leuven
- Occupation: Catholic nun

Monica Van Kerrebroeck (22 July 1939 – 20 August 2023) was a Belgian Catholic nun and politician. A member of Christian Democratic and Flemish, she served in the Flemish Parliament from 2004 to 2009.

Van Kerrebroeck died in Zaffelare on 20 August 2023, at the age of 84.
