= Pascal Vanderveeren =

Belgian lawyer (1946–2023)

- Born: 16 March 1946; Brussels, Belgium
- Died: 24 August 2023 (aged 77)
- Education: UCLouvain; ULB
- Occupation: lawyer
- Known for: president, International Criminal Bar

Pascal Vanderveeren (16 March 1946 – 24 August 2023) was a Belgian lawyer. He was the president of the International Criminal Bar (the bar association of the International Criminal Court) during 2007–2010. He was president of the French-speaking bar in Brussels during 1998–2000. He also founded his own law firm, Vanderveeren & Associes, in Brussels, which specializes in business crime.

Vanderveeren received his Dr. Jur. from the University of Louvain in 1968, and Lic. Econ. Law from the Université libre de Bruxelles in 1969. He was married to Ana da Silveira.

Vanderveeren died on 24 August 2023, at the age of 77.
