= Mark Birkinshaw =

British physicist (1954–2023)

- Born: 1954
- Died: 2023 (aged 68–69)
- Alma mater: University of Cambridge
- Academic career
- Institutions: University of Bristol

Mark Birkinshaw (1954–2023) was a British physicist who held the William P. Coldrick chair in Cosmology and Astrophysics at the University of Bristol. He was the first to detect the Sunyaev–Zel'dovich effect. Birkinshaw died in 2023.
