= 2023 in India =

- Centuries: 19th; 20th; 21st
- Decades: 2000s; 2010s; 2020s
- See also: List of years in India; Timeline of Indian history

Events in the year 2023 in India, during which it became the world's most populous country.

== Incumbents ==
=== National government ===
Photo	Post	Name
	President of India	Droupadi Murmu
	Vice-President of India and Chairman of Rajya Sabha	Jagdeep Dhankhar
	Prime Minister of India	Narendra Modi
	Speaker of the Lok Sabha	Om Birla
	Chief Justice of India	D. Y. Chandrachud
	Governor of Reserve Bank of India	Shaktikanta Das
	Chief Election Commissioner of India	Rajiv Kumar
	Chief of Defence Staff	Anil Chauhan
	Lok Sabha	17th Lok Sabha

=== State governments ===
State	Governor	Chief Minister	Party	Political alliance	Chief Justice
Andhra Pradesh	S. Abdul Nazeer	Y. S. Jagan Mohan Reddy	YSRCP	Regional	Prashant Kumar Mishra
Arunachal Pradesh	Kaiwalya Trivikram Patnaik	Pema Khandu	BJP	N.D.A.	Sandeep Mehta
Assam	Gulab Chand Kataria	Himanta Biswa Sarma	BJP	N.D.A.	Sandeep Mehta
Bihar	Rajendra Arlekar	Nitish Kumar	JD(U)	I.N.D.I.A	Sanjay Karol (Patna High Court)
Chhattisgarh	Biswabhusan Harichandan	Vishnu Deo Sai	BJP	N.D.A.	P. R. Ramachandra Menon
Goa	P. S. Sreedharan Pillai	Pramod Sawant	BJP	N.D.A.	Dipankar Datta
Gujarat	Acharya Dev Vrat	Bhupendrabhai Patel	BJP	N.D.A.	Vikram Nath
Haryana	Bandaru Dattatreya	Manohar Lal Khattar	BJP	N.D.A.	Ravi Shankar Jha
Himachal Pradesh	Shiv Pratap Shukla	Sukhvinder Singh Sukhu	INC	I.N.D.I.A	L. Narayana Swamy
Jharkhand	C. P. Radhakrishnan	Hemant Soren	JMM	I.N.D.I.A	Ravi Ranjan
Karnataka	Thawar Chand Gehlot	Siddaramaiah	INC	I.N.D.I.A	Ritu Raj Awasthi
Kerala	Arif Mohammad Khan	Pinarayi Vijayan	CPI(M)	I.N.D.I.A	S. Manikumar
Madhya Pradesh	Mangubhai Patel	Mohan Yadav	BJP	N.D.A.	Ravi Malimath
Maharashtra	Ramesh Bais	Eknath Shinde	Shiv Sena	N.D.A.	Dipankar Datta
Manipur	Anusuiya Uikey	N. Biren Singh	BJP	N.D.A.	Ramalingam Sudhakar
Meghalaya	Phagu Chauhan	Conrad Sangma	NPP	N.D.A.	Biswanath Somadder
Mizoram	kambhampati hari babu	Lalduhoma	ZPM	Regional	Sandeep Mehta
Nagaland	La. Ganesan	Neiphiu Rio	NDPP	N.D.A.	Sandeep Mehta
Odisha	Raghubar Das	Naveen Patnaik	BJD	Regional	S. Muralidhar
Punjab	Banwarilal Purohit	Bhagwant Mann	AAP	I.N.D.I.A	Ravi Shankar Jha
Rajasthan	Kalraj Mishra	Bhajan Lal Sharma	BJP	N.D.A.	Manindra Mohan Shrivastava
Sikkim	Lakshaman Acharya	Prem Singh Tamang	SKM	N.D.A.	Jitendra Kumar Maheshwari
Tamil Nadu	R. N. Ravi	M. K. Stalin	DMK	I.N.D.I.A	Munishwar Nath Bhandari
Telangana	Tamilisai Soundararajan	Revanth Reddy	INC	I.N.D.I.A	Satish Chandra Sharma
Tripura	Indrasena Reddy	Manik Saha	BJP	N.D.A.	Akil Kureshi
Uttar Pradesh	Anandiben Patel	Yogi Adityanath	BJP	N.D.A.	Rajesh Bindal
Uttarakhand	Gurmit Singh (general)	Pushkar Singh Dhami	BJP	N.D.A.	Raghvendra Singh Chauhan
West Bengal	C. V. Ananda Bose	Mamata Banerjee	AITC	I.N.D.I.A	T. S. Sivagnanam

...

== Events ==
=== January ===
- 1 January
  - Anjali Singh is killed while riding her scooter in Delhi.
  - Kashmir conflict: Four civilians are killed and six others injured when two terrorists open fire against Hindu people's homes in Rajouri district, Jammu and Kashmir.
- 2 January
  - Protests are reported in some parts of Jammu and Kashmir in response to the previous day's quadruple killing.
  - The Supreme Court of India upholds the legality of the government's decision to demonetise all ₹500 and ₹1,000 banknotes of the Mahatma Gandhi Series in 2016.
  - Rajouri attacks: Two children are killed and four other people are injured by an explosion outside the home of one of the four Hindus who were killed.
- 4 January – The Competition Commission of India rejects an appeal from Google over its ruling in October that Google's dominant position in the search engine market and control of the Android app store violated India's antitrust laws.
- 9 January – The historic Shahi Masjid in Saidabad area of Prayagraj, Uttar Pradesh, is demolished as part of a road-widening project.
- 13–29 January – 2023 Men's FIH Hockey World Cup
- 18 January – Several Indian wrestlers, most notably Bajrang Punia, Vinesh Phogat and Sakshi Malik, protest at the Jantar Mantar, New Delhi against the Wrestling Federation of India (WFI). Vinesh Phogat accused WFI president Brij Bhushan Sharan Singh of sexual harassment.

=== February ===
- 26 February – Manish Sisodia, Deputy Chief Minister of Delhi is arrested by the Central Bureau of Investigation in liquor policy case.
- 28 February – Manish Sisodia and Satyendra Jain resign from their ministerial positions following the arrests.

=== March ===
- 2 March – Election results are declared for legislative assembly elections in three states; the BJP retains Tripura and Nagaland and hung assembly on Meghalaya.
- 18 March – Punjab Police initiated a crackdown against the "Waris Punjab De", a Punjab-based organisation, headed by radical Khalistan separatist, Amritpal Singh, arresting 78 persons and detaining several others for questioning. The eventual number of arrests was reported as 112.
- 23–24 March – Rahul Gandhi is disqualified as a member of parliament in the Lok Sabha after being found guilty of defamation by the Surat court. Gandhi was subsequently sentenced to two years in jail.
- 31 March – Indore stepwell collapse: Thirty-six people are killed and 17 others are injured when a stepwell collapses during prayers at a Hindu temple in Indore, Madhya Pradesh.

=== April ===
- April (Exact Date Unknown) – India surpasses China as the world's most populous country.
- 1 April – A new income tax law comes into effect. It is a significant change on the old 1961 statute, and contains a controversial "angel tax" provision seeking to capture some of the income entering the country from foreign investors funding India's start-ups.
- 4 April – Seven people are killed and eleven others are injured in an avalanche in Nathu La, Sikkim.
- 12 April – Four soldiers are killed in a mass shooting incident at a military base in Punjab. Authorities say the shooting is not terror-related.
- 15 April – Twelve people are killed and 28 others are injured when a bus falls into a gorge in Raigad, Maharashtra.
- 15 April – Gangster Atique Ahmed and his brother and gangster Ashraf Ahmed killed in a shootout in Prayagraj.
- 23 April – Radical Khalistan separatist, Amritpal Singh is arrested following his surrender after the gurudwara, in which he was surrounded by police forces in Moga, Punjab. He was then sent to Dibrugarh central jail in Assam under NSA.

=== May ===
- 3 May – 2023 Manipur violence: Ethnic violence breaks out between Kuki and Meitei communities in the state of Manipur. At least 73 people are killed.
- 10–13 May – The Indian National Congress won the 2023 Karnataka Legislative Assembly election by getting 135 out of 224 seats.
- 19 May – Reserve Bank of India announced that it will withdraw all 2000-rupee note in circulation by September 2023.
- 28 May –
  - The New Parliament House in New Delhi is inaugurated by Prime Minister Narendra Modi.
  - 2023 Manipur violence: 33 tribal militants are killed by soldiers during an operation in Manipur, following ethnic clashes in the region.
- 29 May – CSK defeats GT in the 2023 Indian Premier League final by 5 wickets.
- 30 May – Ten Vaishno Devi pilgrims are killed and 57 others are injured as a bus falls from a bridge in Jammu and Kashmir.

=== June ===
- 2 June – 2023 Odisha train collision: train number 12841 Coromandel Express running at 130 km/h (81 mph) collides with a freight train (Goods Train) in Odisha's Balasore district. The accident happened around 19:30 IST near Bahanaga Bazar station when the train was on the way to Chennai Central from Shalimar railway station near Kolkata. More than 20 coaches were derailed. Over 900 were injured and more than 280+ people have been reported to have been killed. Train number 12864 SMVT Bengaluru–Howrah SF Express travelling towards Howrah at 130 km/h (81 mph) hit the derailed coaches of the Coromandel Express and ended up derailing 8 of its own coaches. A total of three trains were involved in this disaster.
- 17 June – At least 96 people die during a heat wave, which began two days before, in the states of Uttar Pradesh and Bihar.

=== July ===
- 1 July
  - 2023 Buldhana bus accident: 26 bus passengers die when a bus catches fire on Mumbai–Nagpur Expressway in Buldhana, Maharashtra.
  - The state of Uttar Pradesh is struck by a severe heat wave, leading to at least 121 deaths in two cities. The scorching temperatures have resulted in heat stroke and other related conditions, causing widespread distress and casualties among the affected population.
- 2 July – 2023 Nationalist Congress Party split: Ajit Pawar along with other NCP party leaders join the BJP led Maha Yuti alliance.
- 7 July – The CBI arrests three individuals; two engineers and a technician; believed to be responsible for the Odisha train collision.
- 12 July – 2023 North India floods: Heavy rain and flash floods kill at least 41 people in Himachal Pradesh and Punjab.
- 18 July – 26 parties for I.N.D.I.A alliance to fight against NDA alliance in the upcoming general elections.
- 19 July
  - A power transformer explodes at the Namami Gange project site in Uttarakhand, leaving 15 dead and 7 injured.
  - 5 suspected terrorists are arrested by CCB in Bangalore, said to have planned a bombing in Bangalore.
- 20 July – 2023 Manipur violence: A video of two women being paraded naked on the streets and subjected to blatant acts of sexual assault and gang rape by a group of tribal men in Manipur goes viral, triggering outrage across the country. According to reports, the incident happened on 4 May.
- 31 July
  - 2023 Jaipur Express killings: constable Chetan Singh kills his superior and three civilians due to ill mental health.
  - 2023 Haryana riots break out across Nuh district.

=== August ===
- 2 August – Rajya Sabha passes the Forest Conservation Act Amendment Bill, which allows diversion of forest land for security and strategic purposes, amid an opposition walk-out over the ongoing violence in Manipur.
- 4 August – The controversial Delhi Ordinance Bill, which gives power to the central government on appointments and transfers of officials of National Capital, is passed in the Rajya Sabha.
- 4 August – An 18 year old NEET aspirant dies by suicide in Kota, Rajasthan leaving behind a suicide note.
- 7 August – Rahul Gandhi's membership in the Lok Sabha is reinstated following the Supreme Court of India accepting his plea & staying conviction.
- 10 August – Prime Minister, Narendra Modi wins a no confidence motion moved by the INDIA Alliance by a voice vote after a opposition walkout from the Lok Sabha in response to the Manipur violence.
- 14 August – Ashoka University accepts the resignation of assistant professor Sabyasachi Das, who authored a paper taking a critical stance against the Bharatiya Janata Party's electoral victory in the 2019 Indian general election.
- 23 August – Chandrayaan-3 becomes the first space mission to land near the Lunar south pole.
- 28 August – 2 students die by suicide in Kota, Rajasthan.
- 29 August – Government of India reduces the price of domestic liquefied petroleum gas by 200 rupees.
- 31 August – The OCCRP releases a report alleging that Vinod Adani committed insider trading through offshore entities in the Adani Group and the Securities and Exchange Board of India committed perjury in investigation against the group.

=== September ===
- 1 September – Clashes between Maharashtra Police and Maratha reservation agitators at Jalna, Maharashtra following indefinite hunger strike by Manoj Jarange-Patil.
- 2 September – India launches Aditya-L1, its first solar observation mission to observe the solar corona, photosphere, and chromosphere and to study solar winds and solar flares, and their effect on Earth and near-space weather.
- 9–10 September – In G20 summit held in New Delhi, a consensus is achieved in the form of Delhi Declaration. The summit also witnessed African Union getting a permanent membership in G20.
  - CNN reports that president Droupadi Murmu and prime minister Narendra Modi using the term of Bharat instead of India name in connection with a G20 gathering, leading to speculating on a possible name change for the country.
- 13 September – 2023 Anantnag encounter
- 19 September – Women's Reservation Bill, 2023 (IAST: Nari Shakti Vandan Adhiniyam), was introduced in Lok Sabha on during the special session of Parliament. This legislation seeks to allocate 33 percent of the seats in the directly elected Lok Sabha and state legislative assemblies for women.
  - 20 September – Lok Sabha passes the bill with 454 votes in favour and two against.
  - 21 September – The Rajya Sabha passes the bill unanimously with 214 votes in favour and none against.
  - 28 September 2023 – President Murmu signs the bill.
- 28 September – 2023 Manipur violence: More than 80 people are injured during riots during protests over the murder of two Meitei students in Manipur.

=== October ===
- 4 October – 2023 Sikkim flash floods:
  - At least 14 people are killed and 100 others are missing after a cloudburst causes severe flooding in Sikkim.
  - The Lhonak Lake bursts its banks, causing major flooding and impacting 22,000 people. It its the worst such disaster in the region in over 50 years.
  - Large parts of the Teesta Dam are washed away, with multiple large bridges also being destroyed.
- 9 October – The death toll of the floods in Sikkim, Northeast India, rises to 74.
- 17 October – The Supreme Court of India refuses to legalize same-sex marriage saying it is up to parliament.
- 29 October –
  - Kalamassery convention centre bombing: An IED explodes at a Jehovah's Witnesses' prayer meeting at the Zamra International Convention Center in Kalamassery, Kerala, killing six people and wounding 36 others.
  - 2023 Andhra Pradesh train collision: On 29 October 2023 at around 7pm a moving Visakhapatnam-Rayagada passenger train derailed after colliding with the Visakhapatnam-Palasa passenger train near Kottavalasa Junction railway station in Vizianagaram district, Andhra Pradesh killing at least 13 and injuring 50.

=== November ===
- 1 November – 2023 IIT-BHU gang rape: A 22 year old B.Tech student is gang raped by 3 members of the BJP IT Cell in Varanasi, Uttar Pradesh.
- 7 November – Legislative Assemble elections for Mizoram and Phase-I elections for Chhattisgarh was held.
- 15 November – 2023 Doda bus accident: A bus carrying passengers slides off the road and falls down a 300-foot valley in Doda district, Jammu and Kashmir, killing at least 39 people and injuring 19 others.
- 19 November – 2023 Cricket World Cup final: India loses to Australia in the final match of the 2023 Cricket World Cup.
- 29 November –
  - Uttarakhand tunnel rescue: 41 construction workers are rescued from a road tunnel collapse after being trapped for more than two weeks.
  - The Central Government signs a peace agreement with the United National Liberation Front the oldest Meitei insurgent group in Manipur and the Northeast.

=== December ===
- 1 December - 26 students die by suicide in Kota, Rajasthan in 2023 which is one of the highest ever in history.
- 3–4 December - Election results for five states declared - BJP wins Rajasthan, Madhya Pradesh and Chhattisgarh, INC wins Telangana and ZPM wins Mizoram.
- 11 December - The Supreme Court of India upholds the constitutionality of the cancellation of Article 370 of the Constitution of India.
- 13 December - 2023 Indian Parliament breach: Two individuals entered the Lok Sabha chamber from the public gallery. One of the individuals jumped onto the tables where the Members of Parliament (MPs) were seated and released a yellow-colored smoke canister. The other individual allegedly chanted slogans. This caused chaos and panic within the house, leading to the immediate adjournment of the session. Two other individuals were detained outside the building.
- 17 December - Nine workers are killed and three others are injured in an explosion at a factory in Nagpur district, Maharashtra.
- 19 December - 2023 Indian Parliament breach: 49 Lok Sabha MPs are suspended from parliament for taking part in protests relating to a security breach in parliament, bringing the total number of suspensions to 141, 95 from the Lok Sabha, and 46 from the Rajya Sabha.
- 21 December - Four Indian soldiers are killed and three others are injured after gunmen opened fire against two army vehicles in Jammu and Kashmir.
- 23 December - Locals in Indian-controlled Kashmir say the Indian Army tortured three detainees to death, with five other surviving detainees reporting that they were also subjected to torture.
- 28 December - At least 13 people are killed when a bus catches fire after colliding head-on with a truck on a highway in Guna district, Madhya Pradesh.

== Deaths ==
=== January ===
- 1 January
  - N. C. Debbarma, 80, politician, Tripura MLA (since 2018)
  - R. K. Krishna Kumar, 84, entrepreneur (Tata Sons, Sir Dorabji Tata and Allied Trusts)
- 2 January – Siddeshwar Swami, 82, Hindu religious leader
- 3 January
  - Laxman Pandurang Jagtap, 59, politician, Maharashtra MLA (since 2009)
- 4 January
  - Thirumagan Evera, 46, politician, Tamil Nadu MLA (since 2021)
  - Beeyar Prasad, 61, lyricist (Kilichundan Mampazham, Njan Salperu Ramankutty, Vamanapuram Bus Route)
- 7 January
  - Nazrul Islam, 73, politician, Assam MLA (1996–2021)
  - Tehemton Erach Udwadia, 88, surgeon and gastroenterologist

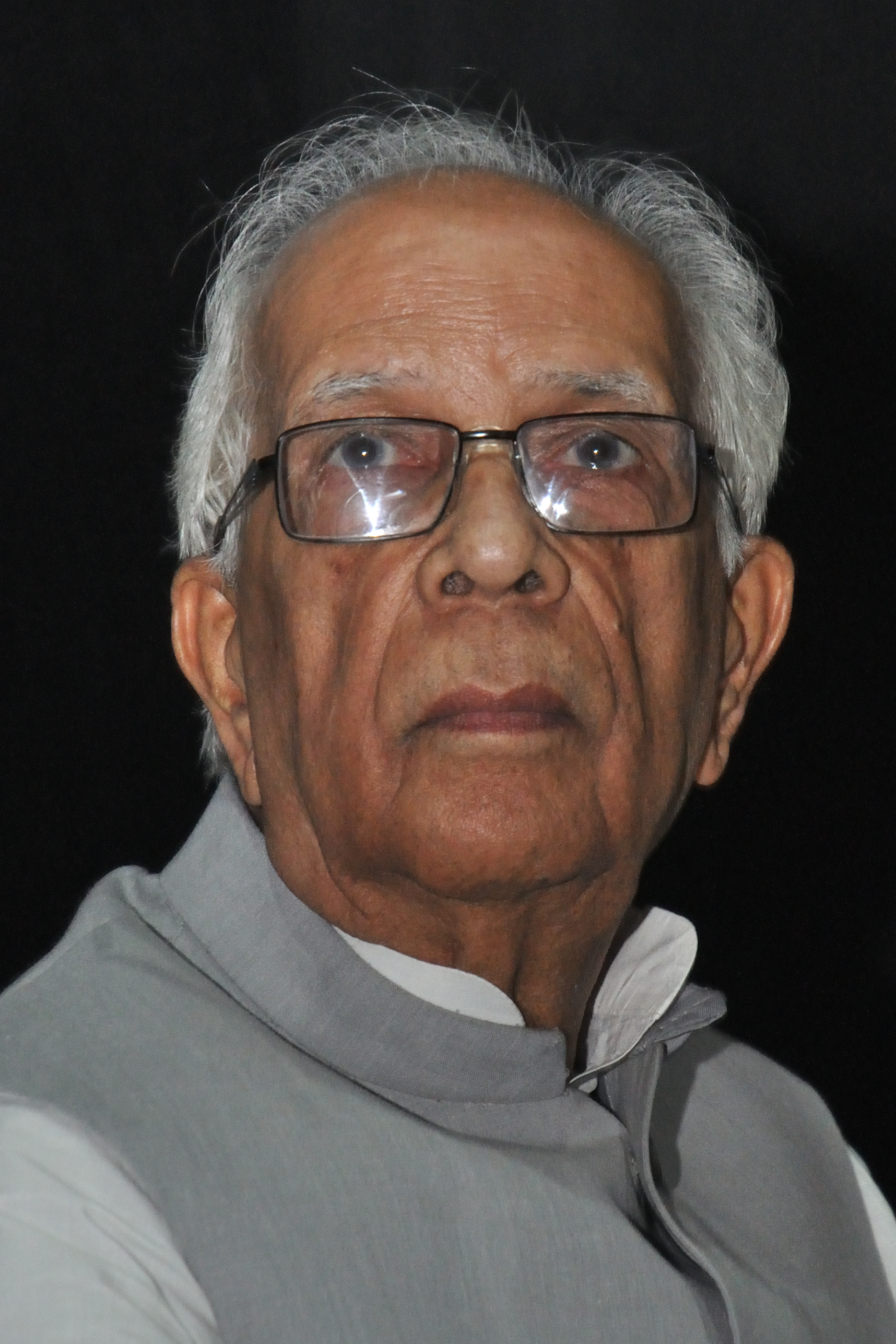
Keshari Nath Tripathi

- 8 January – Keshari Nath Tripathi, 88, politician, Uttar Pradesh MLA (1977–1980, 1989–2007), governor of West Bengal (2014–2019) and twice of Bihar
- 9 January – Rehman Rahi, 97, poet
- 10 January - Sara Aboobacker, 86, writer

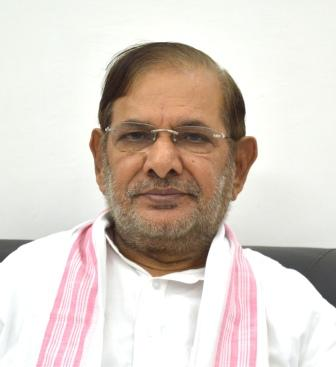
Sharad Yadav

- 12 January
  - Sharad Yadav, 75, politician from Rashtriya Janata Dal (RJD) party
  - Sidharth Sharma, 28, cricketer
  - Sanjay Chauhan, 62, screenwriter
- 13 January - Mani Prasad, 90, classical vocalist
- 14 January
  - Mansa Ram, 82, politician, Himachal Pradesh MLA (1967–1977, 1982–1985, 1998–2003)
  - Santokh Singh Chaudhary, 76, politician
- 18 January
  - Jagdish Nehra, 79, politician, Haryana MLA (1982–1987)
  - Prabhaben Shah, 92, social worker
- 19 January
  - Abdul Ghani Azhari, 101, Islamic scholar
  - Kuldip Singh Dhillon, 72, Indian-British property developer and polo player
  - Nilmani Phookan Jr, 89, poet
- 21 January
  - Harjit Singh Arora, 61, Indian Air Force officer, vice chief of the air staff (2019–2021)
  - Ravipudi Venkatadri, 100, activist
- 22 January
  - Sabir Ali, 67, decathlete
  - Siddheshwar Prasad, 92, politician
- 23 January
  - E. Ramdoss, 66, film director, screenwriter (Aayiram Pookkal Malarattum, Ravanan) and actor
  - Krityunjai Prasad Sinha, 93, theoretical physicist
  - Sudheer Varma, 34, actor.

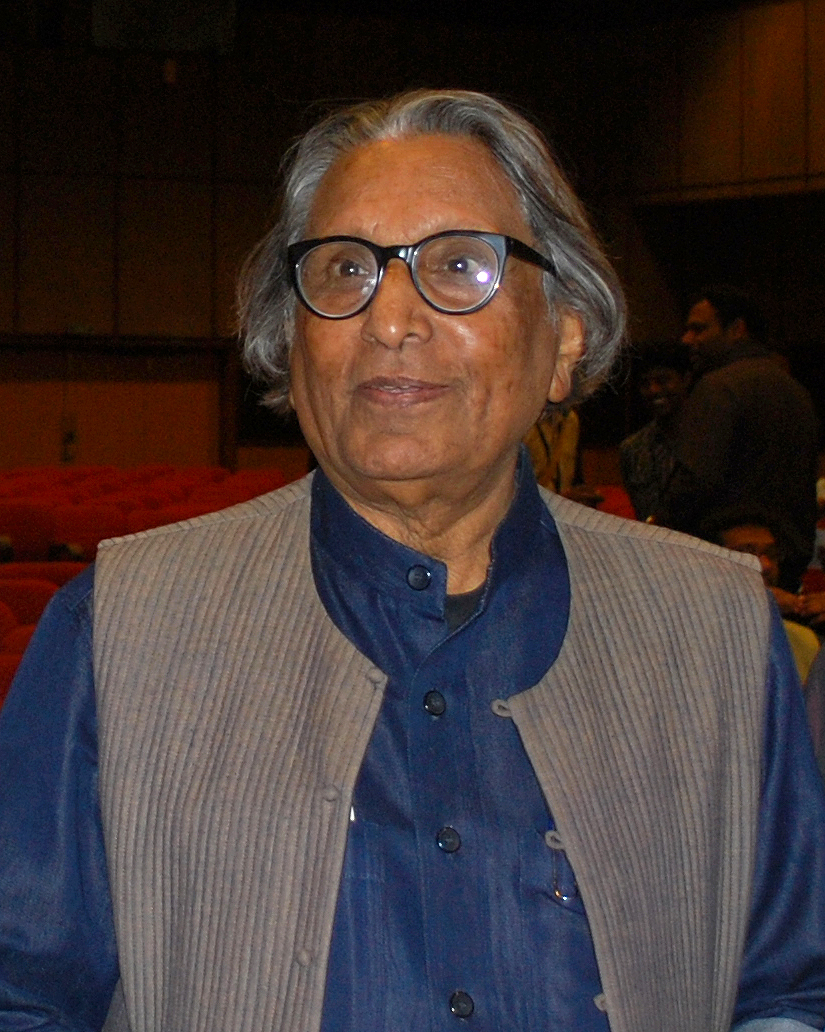
B. V. Doshi

- 24 January – B. V. Doshi, 95, architect (CEPT University, Tagore Memorial Hall, Indian Institute of Management Bangalore), Pritzker Prize winner (2018)
- 25 January – Shantabai Kamble, 99, writer
- 26 January – Judo. K. K. Rathnam, 92, stuntman (Thamarai Kulam, Vallavan Oruvan, Thalai Nagaram)

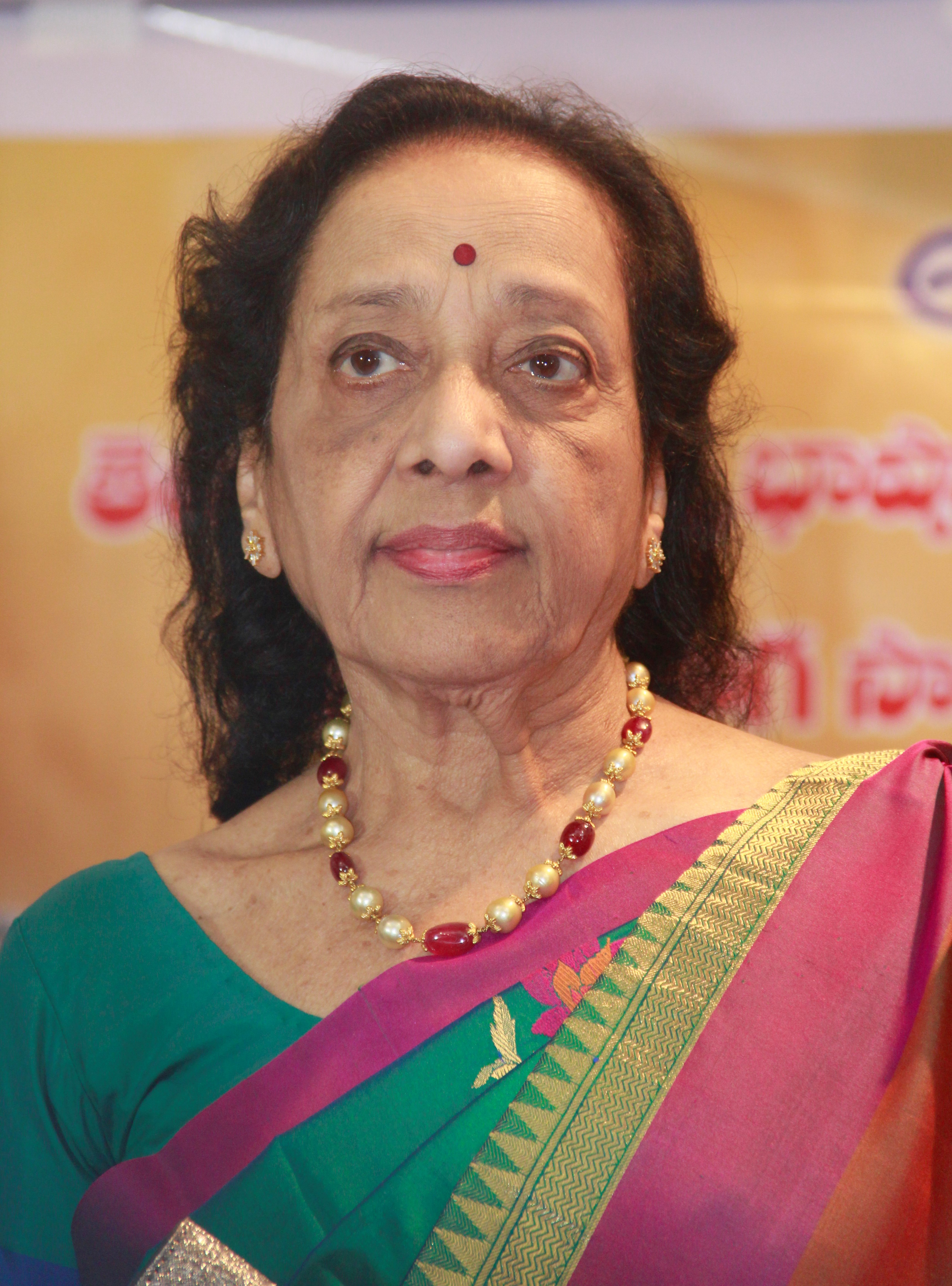
Jamuna

- 27 January – Jamuna, 86, actress (Milan, Pandanti Kapuram) and politician, MP (1989–1991)
- 28 January - Hussain Rabi Gandhi, 74, writer
- 29 January
  - Naba Das, 61, politician, Odisha MLA (since 2009)
  - Mandeep Roy, 73, actor (Minchina Ota, Baadada Hoo, Benkiya Bale)
  - Vatti Vasant Kumar, 67, politician, Andhra Pradesh MLA (2004–2014)
- 30 January – K. V. Tirumalesh, 82, writer and poet

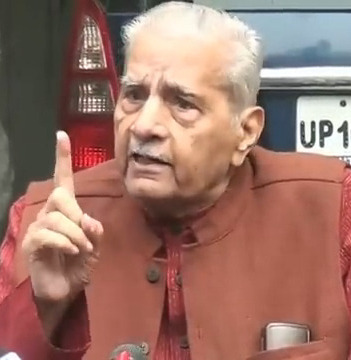
Shanti Bhushan

- 31 January
  - Shanti Bhushan, 97, Indian lawyer and politician, minister of law and justice (1977–1979)
  - C. Lalitha, 84, Carnatic vocalist

=== February ===
- 1 February - Parimal Dey, 81, footballer

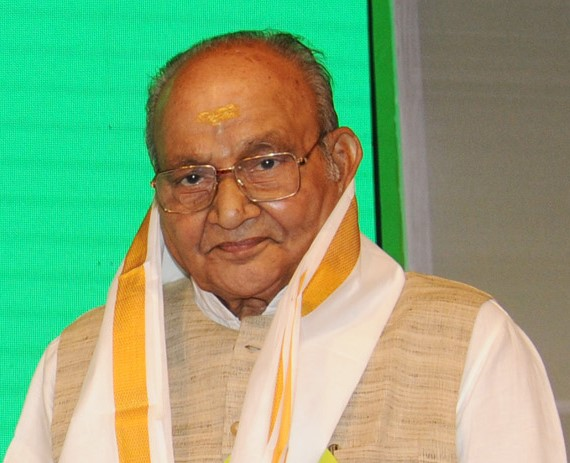
K. Viswanath

- 2 February
  - K. Viswanath, 92, actor and filmmaker
  - Rahul Prakash, 39, politician
- 3 February - Anthony Fernandes, 86, bishop

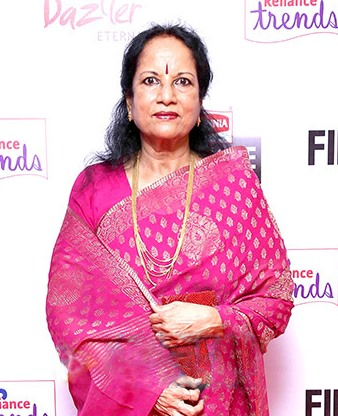
Vani Jairam

- 4 February – Vani Jairam, 77, playback singer
- 5 February – T. P. Gajendran, 68, actor, comedian and director
- 6 February - B. K. S. Varma, 74, painter
- 8 February
  - Subimal Mishra, 79, novelist
  - Ignatius Paul Pinto, 97, bishop
- 12 February - Narayan Satham, 73, cricketer
- 13 February - Lalita Lajmi, 90, painter
- 14 February
  - Javed Khan Amrohi, 73, actor
  - Kudarikoti Annadanayya Swamy, 87, judge
- 16 February
  - Tulsidas Balaram, 86, footballer
  - Jatu Lahiri, 86, politician
- 17 February
  - Shahnawaz Pradhan, 56, actor
  - Vijay Kichlu, 92, singer
  - John Mason, 78, schoolmaster and educationist
  - Amritpal Chotu, comedian and actor
- 18 February
  - Taraka Ratna, 39, actor
- 19 February
  - Mayilsamy, 57, actor and comedian
  - S. N. M. Ubayadullah, 81, politician
- 20 February
  - Bela Bose, 79, actress, dancer
  - Om Prakash Kohli, 87, politician
- 22 February
  - Shahnawaz Pradhan, 41, actress, comedian
  - Kanak Rele, 85, dancer, choreographer
  - Subi Suresh, 41, actress
- 23 February - Hasan Ali Khan, 71, businessman
- 24 February – Devisingh Ransingh Shekhawat, 89, agriculturist, politician
- 25 February - S. M. Razaullah Ansari, 90, historian
- 27 February – Srutimala Duara, 57, academician, writer

=== March ===
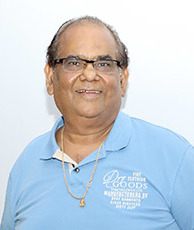
Satish Kaushik.

- 1 March
  - Pintu Nanda, 45, actor
  - Neela Ramgopal, 87, Carnatic vocalist
- 2 March
  - Chandrashekhar Dasgupta, 82, diplomat, civil servant
  - Aziz Mushabber Ahmadi, 90, judge

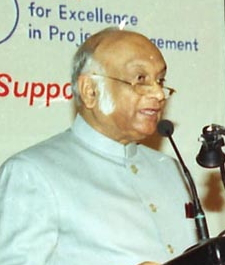
Satyabrata Mookherjee

- 3 March
  - Satyabrata Mookherjee, 90, advocate
  - Sasthipada Chattopadhyay, 81, novelist
- 4 March – Joseph Gabriel Fernandez, 97, bishop
- 6 March
  - Kuppuswami Sampath, 75, footballer
  - M. A. Ramlu, 96, academic
- 7 March
  - Prafulla Kumar Jena, 91, metallurgist
  - Jitendra Nath Mohanty, 95, philosopher
- 8 March
  - Satish Kaushik, 66, actor and filmmaker
  - Randhir Singh, 65, cricketer
- 9 March – Samaraditya Pal, 84, advocate
- 10 March - Dhiruben Patel, 96, novelist
- 11 March – R. Dhruvanarayana, 61, politician
- 13 March
  - Pradeep Uppoor, 64, film producer
  - K. Vijayarama Rao, 87, IPS Officer
- 14 March – Ved Pratap Vaidik, 78, journalist, political analyst
- 15 March – Sameer Khakhar, 70, actor
- 16 March - Anna Sujatha Mathai, 89, poet
- 18 March – Joseph Powathil, 92, archbishop
- 21 March
  - Jag Mohan Nath, 92, Indian Air Force officer
  - K. P. Dandapani, 76, lawyer
  - Y. R. Meena, 76, judge
- 23 March - Abhay Chhajlani, 88, journalist
- 24 March – Pradeep Sarkar, 67, director

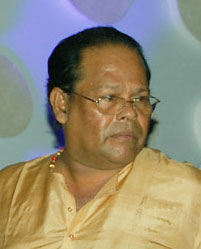
Innocent

- 26 March – Innocent, 75, actor, film producer, writer and politician
- 29 March
  - Girish Bapat, 72, politician
  - Vivan Sundaram, 79, artist
  - Yerra Narayanaswamy, 91, politician
- 30 March - Sujan Singh Bundela, 76, politician
- 31 March
  - Sarah Thomas, 88, novelist
  - Sandipan Thorat, 90, politician

=== April ===
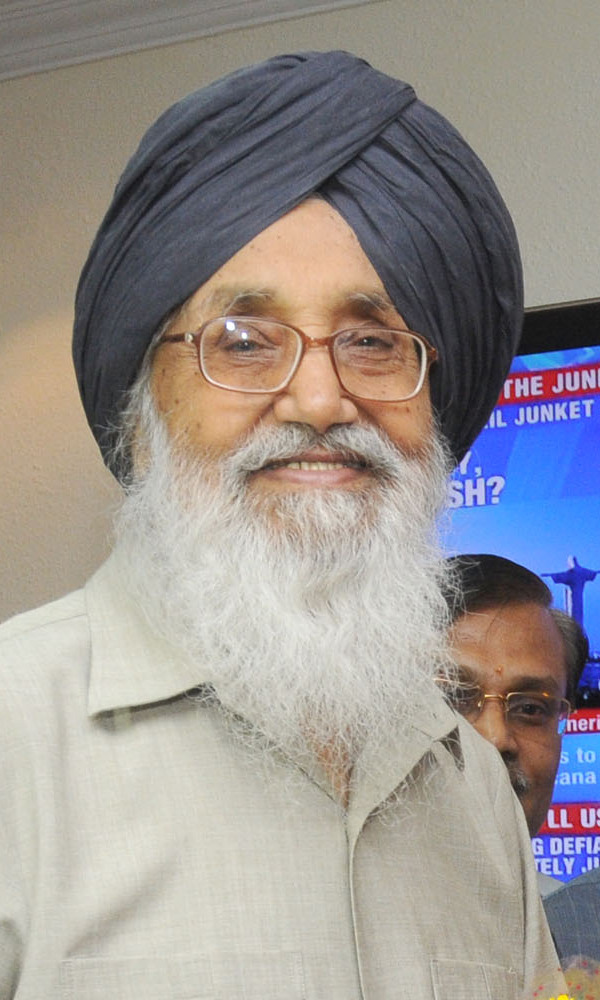
Parkash Singh Badal.

- 1 April – Swarna Ram, 83, politician
- 2 April – Salim Durani, 88, cricketer
- 3 April – T. B. Radhakrishnan, 63, judge
- 4 April
  - Suneet Chopra, 81, politician
  - Rockstar Ramani Ammal, 69, singer
- 5 April – Sudhir Naik, 78, cricketer
- 6 April – Jagarnath Mahto, 56, politician
- 7 April
  - Prabir Ghosh, 78, author
  - Kalamandalam Devaki, 76, dancer
- 9 April – Jalabala Vaidya, 86, actress
- 12 April
  - Keshub Mahindra, 99, businessman
  - Uttara Baokar, 79, actress
- 13 April - Rabey Hasani Nadwi, 93, Sunni Islamic scholar
- 15 April
  - Atique Ahmed, 60, gangster
  - V. T. Joseph, 89, actor
  - Kanithi Viswanatham, 90, politician
  - Khalid Azim, 49, politician
- 18 April
  - Abdul Azeem, 62, cricketer
  - Chandita Mukherjee, 70, filmmaker
  - Ajai Singh, 88, Lieutenant General
- 20 April – Pamela Chopra, 75, singer
- 21 April - Trilochan Kanungo, 82, politician
- 22 April - Sunil Kumar Podder, 86, molecular biologist and biophysicist
- 24 April - Kedar Bodas, 59, classical vocalist
- 25 April
  - Parkash Singh Badal, 95, politician
  - Himangshu Mohan Choudhury, 82, civil servant
- 26 April
  - Mamukkoya, 76, actor
  - Chandan Ram Das, 65, politician
  - Isidore Fernandes, 76, bishop
  - Jay Mala, 64, journalist
- 27 April – Kaur Singh, 74, boxer
- 28 April – Ranajit Guha, 99, historian

=== May ===
- 1 May - M. Chandran, 76, politician
- 2 May – Arun Manilal Gandhi, 89, author and activist
- 3 May – Manobala, 69, actor, comedian and filmmaker
- 4 May – Karaikudi Mani, 77, mridangam player
- 6 May - Nabeesa Ummal, 91, academic
- 7 May - Yaseen Akhtar Misbahi, 70, Sunni Sufi Islamic scholar
- 8 May
  - Vishwanath Mahadeshwar, 63, politician
  - Samaresh Majumdar, 79, writer
- 9 May – Mohan Maharishi, 83, director
- 12 May - Jethabhai Rathod, 86, politician
- 13 May - Ram G. Takwale, 90, academic administrator
- 15 May - Chow Tewa Mein, 80, politician
- 16 May
  - Hari Shankar Tiwari, 90, gangster
  - P. K. R. Pillai, 92, film producer
- 17 May - S. P. Hinduja, 87, businessman
- 18 May – Rattan Lal Kataria, 71, politician
- 21 May - Chungkhokai Doungel, 82, politician
- 22 May

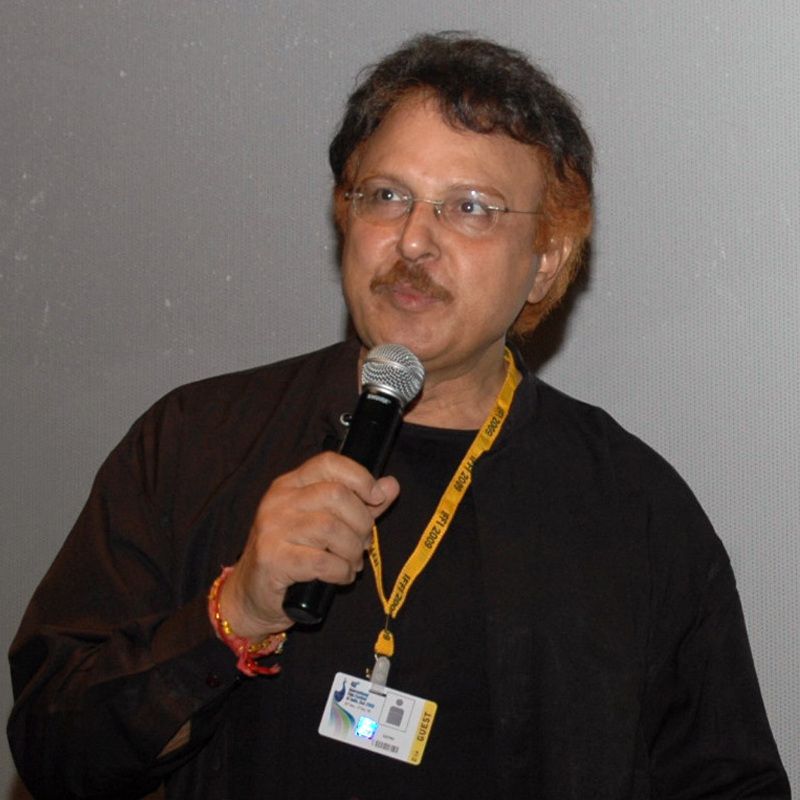
Sarath Babu

  - Sarath Babu, 71, actor
  - Aditya Singh Rajput, 32, actor
  - Vaibhavi Upadhyay, 38, actress
- 23 May - Nitesh Pandey, 51, actor
- 26 May
  - Micky Jagtiani, 70, Indian-origin Emirati billionaire businessman
  - Govindray H. Nayak, 89, writer
- 30 May
  - Gurdial Singh, 99, mountaineer
  - Ved Kumari Ghai, 91, Sanskrit scholar
- 31 May - Vellayani Arjunan, 90, writer

=== June ===
- 2 June - Jayant Sahasrabuddhe, 57, paramilitary activist
- 3 June - Aamir Raza Husain, 66, actor
- 4 June
  - Sulochana Latkar, 94, actress
  - Iliyas Azmi, 88, politician
- 7 June
  - Ivan Menezes, 63, Indian-born British-American business executive
  - Banani Ghosh, 88, musician
- 11 June - Mangal Dhillon, 65, actor
- 12 June - Kazan Khan, 50, actor
- 14 June
  - K. R. Parthasarathy, 86, statistician
  - Sharda, 89, singer
- 16 June - Anadi Charan Das, 88, politician
- 18 June
  - Poojappura Ravi, 86, actor
  - Navroze Contractor, 79, filmmaker
- 20 June - M. A. Kuttappan, 76, politician
- 21 June - Sylvester da Cunha, 92, advertising professional
- 22 June - P. Sabanayagam, 101, IAS officer
- 24 June - S. M. Cyril, 86, nun and educationist
- 25 June
  - Tapas Das, 68, singer-songwriter and guitarist
  - Raj Karan Singh, 87, politician
- 26 June
  - Hardwar Dubey, 73, politician
  - C. V. Dev, 83, actor
- 27 June - P. Chitran Namboodirippad, 103, writer
- 30 June - Bir Devinder Singh, 73, politician

=== July ===
- 1 July - Sampat Prakash, 86, trade unionist
- 2 July - K. Jayaram, 74, photographer
- 3 July
  - Sudakshina Sarma, 88, singer and musician
  - Yashpaul, 86, classical singer
- 7 July - K M Vasudevan Namboothiri, 97, painter and sculptor
- 8 July - Tarun Chatterjee, 78, judge
- 9 July - Rajani Duganna, 78, politician
- 11 July - Ravindra Mahajani, 77, actor and director
- 13 July - Kalyan Jain, 88, politician
- 17 July - Mangala Narlikar, 80, mathematician
- 18 July - Oommen Chandy, 79, politician
- 21 July - Mahabhashyam Chittaranjan, 84, author and composer
- 24 July - Jayant Savarkar, 87, actor
- 25 July - Shirish Kanekar, 80, journalist
- 26 July
  - Surinder Shinda, 70, singer
  - Umakanta Bairagi, 80, Tokari geet musician
- 27 July - Bapusaheb Parulekar, 94, politician
- 30 July - Kavita Singh, 58, art historian
- 31 July
  - Vakkom Purushothaman, 95, politician
  - Rusi Cooper, 100, cricketer and lawyer

=== August ===
- 2 August - Nitin Chandrakant Desai, 57, art director
- 3 August
  - Sunil Dev, 75, cricketer
  - Namdeo Dhondo Mahanor, 80, poet and lyricist
- 4 August
  - N. Vittal, 85, civil servant
  - Achyut Yagnik, 77, journalist
- 5 August - Shreyas Hareesh, 13, racing rider
- 6 August - Gaddar, 74, poet
- 7 August - Ambareesh Murty, 51, entrepreneur
- 8 August - Siddique, 68, director
- 9 August
  - Hari Narke, 60, writer
  - Polali Jayarama Bhat, 71, banker
- 10 August - Nibedita Pradhan, 60, politician
- 11 August - Bikash Sinha, 78, physicist
- 13 August - M. R. S. Rao, 75, scientist
- 15 August
  - Mohammed Habib, 74, footballer

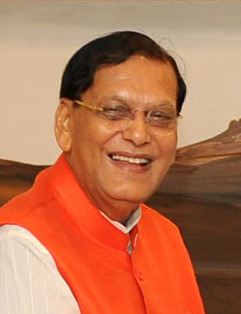
Bindeshwar Pathak

  - Bindeshwar Pathak, 80, sociologist
- 16 August - V. S. R. Arunachalam, 87, scientist
- 20 August - Gulzar Azmi, 89, cleric
- 22 August - C. R. Rao, 102, mathematician and statistician
- 24 August - Seema Deo, 81, film actress
- 25 August - V. A. Andamuthu, 82, politician
- 26 August
  - Dev Kohli, 80, poet and lyricist
  - K. P. Hariharaputhran, 79, film editor
- 27 August
  - Jayanta Mahapatra, 94, poet
  - Des Raj Kali, 52, Punjabi writer and journalist
- 29 August - Sarojini Balanandan, 85, politician
- 31 August - Aparna P. Nair, 33, actress

=== September ===
- 2 September
  - R. S. Shivaji, 66, actor and director
  - Surjya Narayan Patro, 74, politician
- 3 September - Piloo Reporter, 84, cricket umpire
- 6 September
  - Arun Kumar Sinha, 60, IPS officer
  - Malini Rajurkar, 82, classical singer
  - Aditya Dicky Singh, 57, wildlife conservationist
- 8 September
  - G. Marimuthu, 57, actor and director
  - Ajit Ninan, 68, political cartoonist
- 13 September - Manik Bhide, 88, classical music vocalist
- 16 September
  - Gita Mehta, 79, writer and filmmaker
  - C. R. Omanakuttan, 80, writer
- 17 September - Sikkil Neela, 85, flutist
- 18 September
  - Riaz Ahmed, 84, volleyball player
  - Tarachand Patel, 81, politician
- 19 September - Babu, 60, actor
- 21 September
  - Akhil Mishra, 67, actor
  - Saroja Vaidyanathan, 86, choreographer

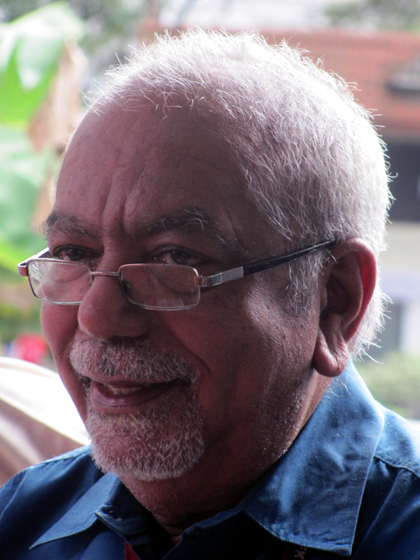
K. G. George

- 24 September - K. G. George, 77, filmmaker
- 27 September - Soumendu Roy, 90, cinematographer
- 28 September

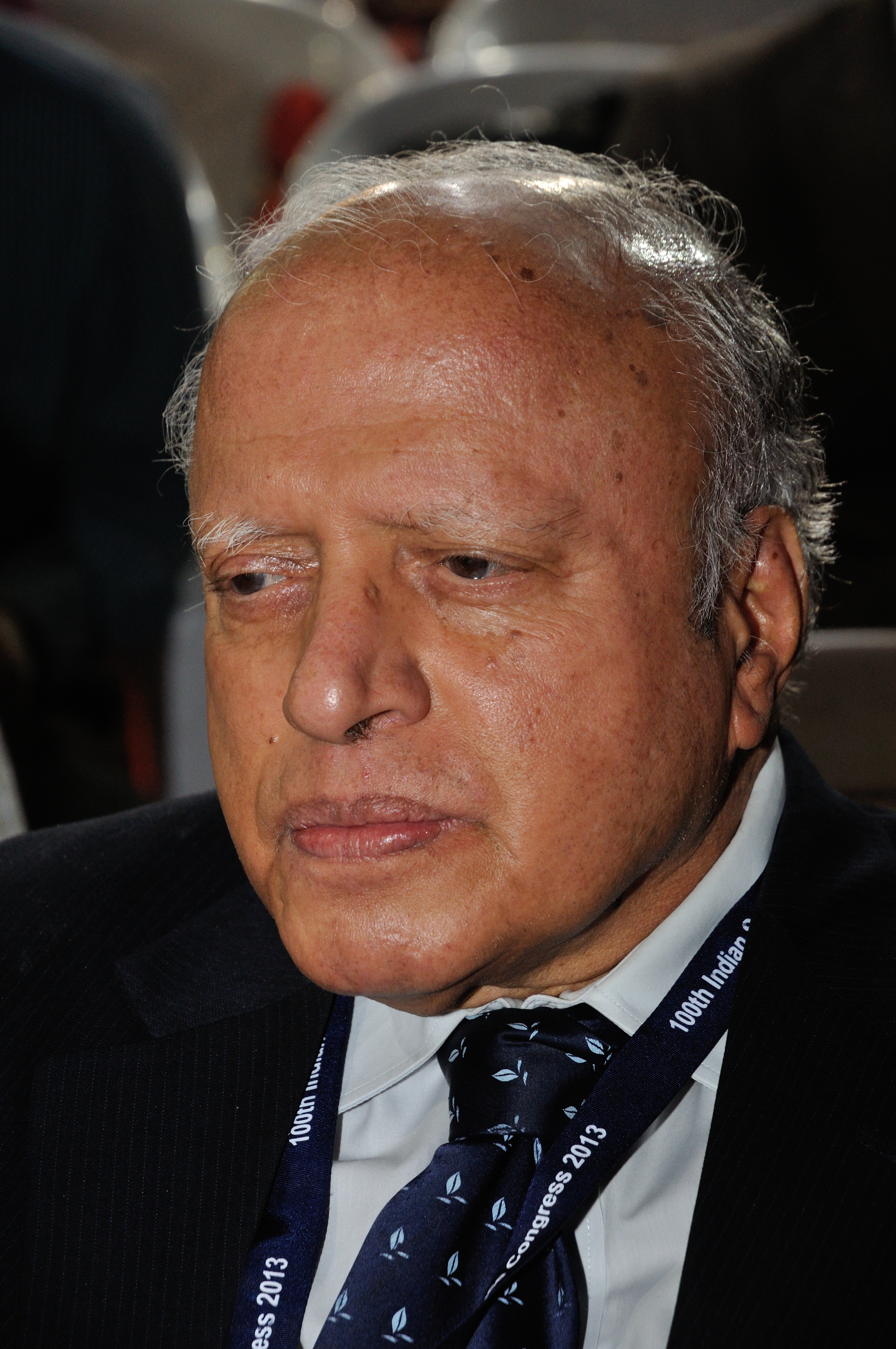
M. S. Swaminathan

  - M. S. Swaminathan, 98, agronomist
  - Ashwin Dani, 79, businessman
- 30 September - Praful Bhavsar, 97, space scientist

=== October ===
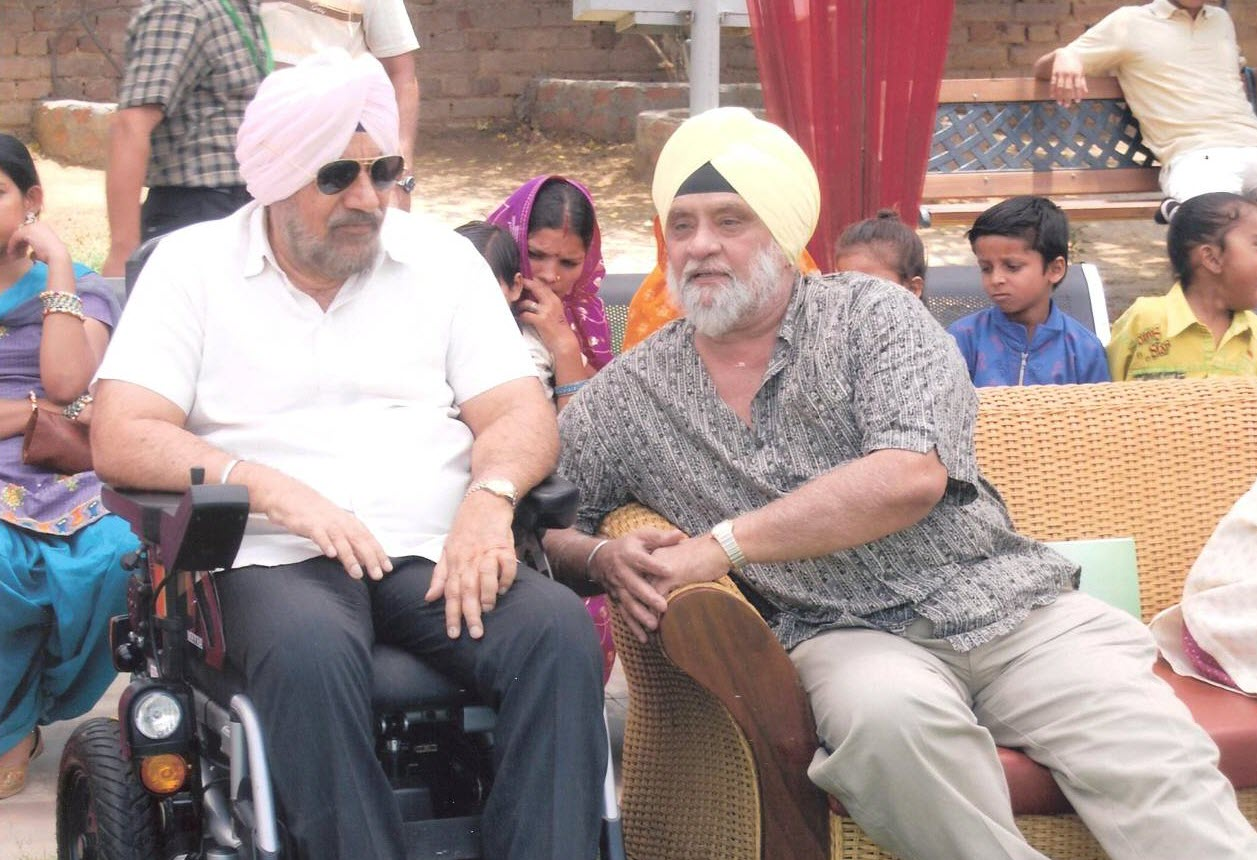
Bishan Singh Bedi.

- 1 October
  - Parveen Amanullah, 65, politician
  - Tripurari Sharma, 67, playwright, stage director and screenwriter
- 2 October - Satyaram Reang, 80, folk artist
- 4 October
  - Telesphore Toppo, 83, bishop
  - P. Jayadevi, 65, director, producer and screenwriter
- 5 October - Anathalavattom Anandan, 86, politician
- 10 October - Karthyayani Amma, 101
- 12 October
  - Sartaj Singh, 83, politician
  - Nayan H. Desai, 77, poet
- 13 October - P. V. Gangadharan, 80, film producer and businessman

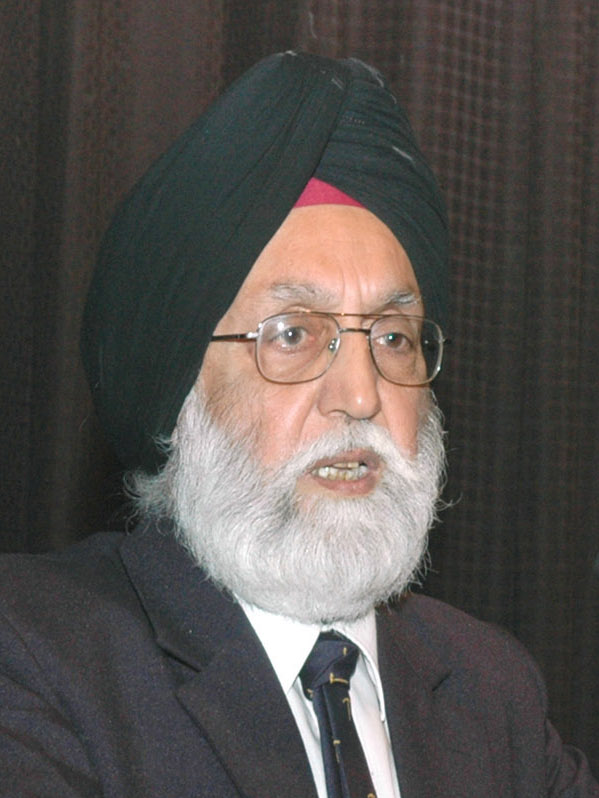
M. S. Gill

- 15 October
  - M. S. Gill, 87, politician
  - Ghulam Nabi Khayal, 84, poet
- 17 October
  - Kundara Johny, 71, actor
  - Wasil Doolwal, 36, political activist
- 19 October - Bangaru Adigalar, 82, spiritual guru
- 23 October
  - Bishan Singh Bedi, 77, cricketer
  - Birendra Nath Datta, 88, academician
  - Daya Saran Sinha, 82, judge
- 24 October - P. Veldurai, 73, politician
- 26 October
  - Prabhatsinh Pratapsinh Chauhan, 82, politician
  - Malay Roy Choudhury, 83, poet
  - Babanrao Dhakne, 85, politician
- 27 October - Swarup Nayak, 76, musician
- 30 October
  - Sarwat Karim Ansari, 67, politician
  - Sarat Barkotoky, 88, politician
  - Renjusha Menon, 35, actress

=== November ===
- 1 November
  - Leela Omchery, 94, singer and writer
  - Saraswati Pradhan, 98, politician
- 2 November - Junior Balaiah, 70, actor
- 3 November
  - Gieve Patel, 83, poet
  - Govardhan Mangilal Sharma, 74, politician
- 7 November
  - Maheswar Mohanty, 67, politician
  - D. B. Chandregowda, 87, politician
  - Arputhan, 52, film director
- 9 November
  - Kalabhavan Haneef, 63, actor
  - Ashutosh Tandon, 63, politician
  - K. A. Francis, 75, painter
- 10 November

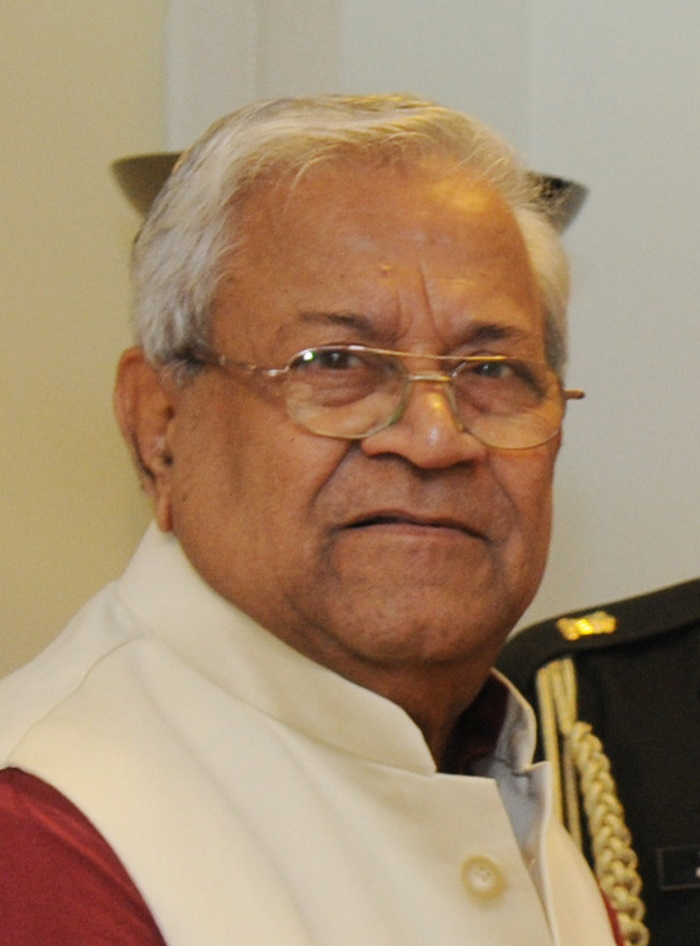
Padmanabha Acharya

  - Padmanabha Acharya, 92, politician
  - Ganga, 63, actor

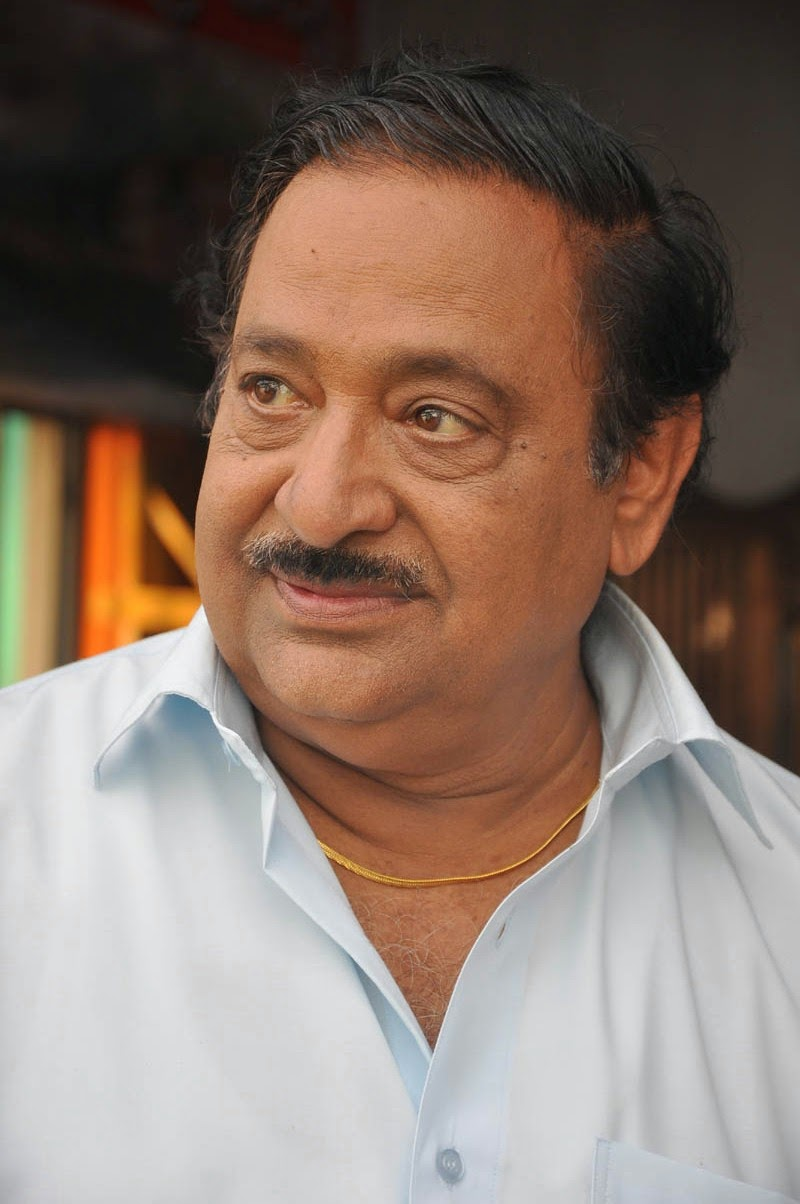
Chandra Mohan

- 11 November - Chandra Mohan, 80, actor
- 13 November - Basudeb Acharia, 81, politician
- 14 November
  - Prithvi Raj Singh Oberoi, 94, businessman
  - Subrata Roy, 75, businessman
- 15 November
  - P. K. Narayanan Nambiar, 96, musician
  - N. Sankaraiah, 102, politician
  - Gurmeet Singh Kooner, 75, politician
- 16 November - Kailash Bhansali, 82, politician
- 17 November - B. N. Goswamy, 90, art critic and historian
- 18 November - S. Venkitaramanan, 92, RBI Governor
- 19 November
  - Sanjay Gadhvi, 57, film director and writer
  - C. L. Porinchukutty, 91, artist and art educator
- 21 November
  - S. S. Badrinath, 83, founder and chairman emeritus of Sankara Nethralaya
  - R. Ramachandran, 71, politician
  - P. Vatsala, 84, novelist

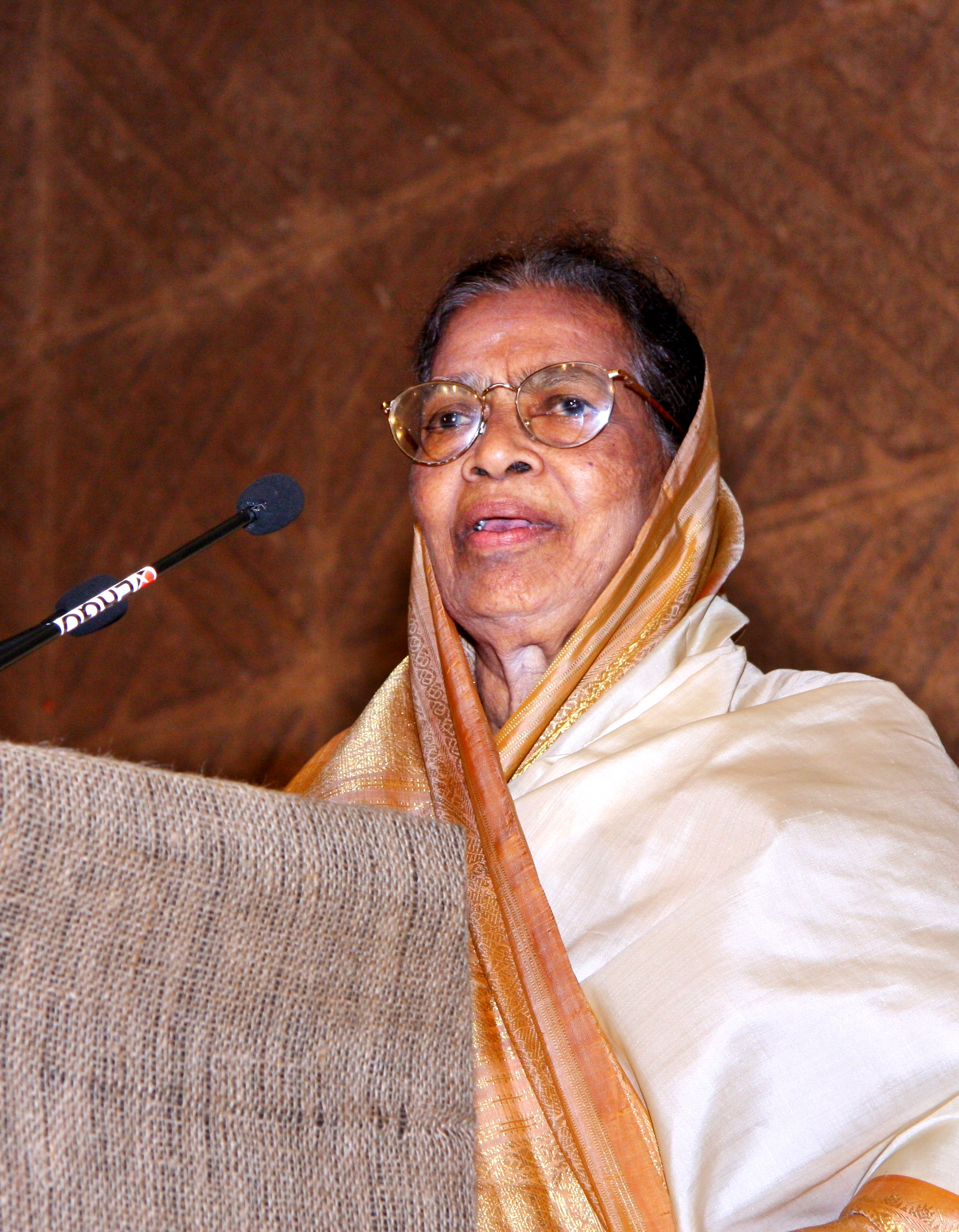
Fathima Beevi

- 23 November - Fathima Beevi, 96, judge
- 24 November - Rajkumar Kohli, 93, director
- 25 November - B. Sasikumar, 74, Carnatic music violinist
- 27 November - Zaverilal Mehta, 96, photographer
- 30 November - Subbalakshmi, 87, actor

=== December ===
- 1 December - Lakhbir Singh Rode, 71, Khalistani separatist
- 2 December
  - A. Deivanayagam, 88, politician
  - V. Lakshmibai, 78, mathematician

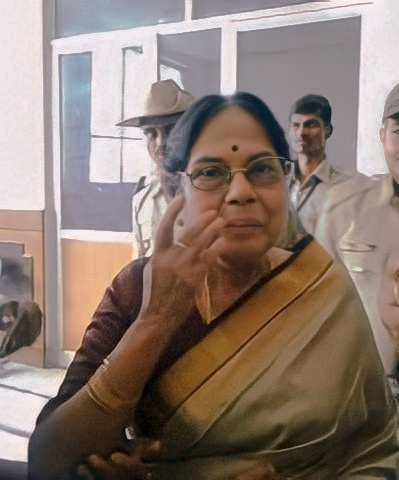
Leelavathi

- 3 December
  - Thanga Darlong, 103, folk music artist
  - M. Kunjaman, 74, economist

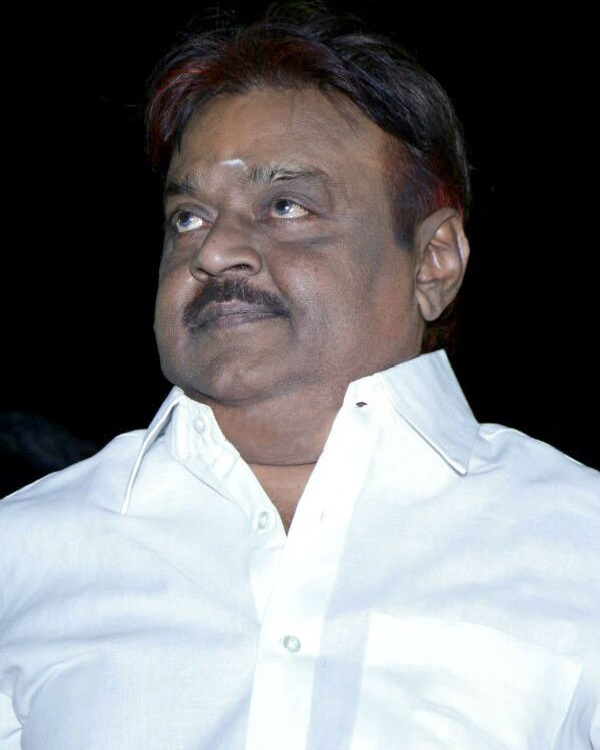
Vijayakanth

- 5 December
  - Dinesh Phadnis, 57, actor
  - Ranjit Singh Talwandi, 67, politician
- 8 December
  - Leelavathi, 86, actress
  - Kanam Rajendran, 73, politician
- 13 December
  - Ram Prakash, 84, politician
  - K. Kunhiraman, 80, politician
- 15 December - Anup Ghoshal, 78, playback singer
- 16 December
  - Sailakshmi Balijepally, 49, paediatrician
  - Jayanta Das, 54, actor and director
- 19 December - V. Mohini Giri, 85, social worker and activist
- 23 December - Bonda Mani, 60, actor and comedian
- 28 December - Vijayakanth, 71, actor and politician

== See also ==
=== Country overviews ===
- History of India
- History of modern India
- Outline of India
- Government of India
- Politics of India
- Timeline of Indian history
- Years in India

=== Related timelines for current period ===
- 2020s in political history
- 2020s
- 21st century
