= Sayan, India =

Sayan
- Village
- Village in Surat
- Location in Gujarat, India Sayan (India)
- Coordinates: 21°19′01″N 72°52′40″E
- Country: India
- State: Gujarat
- District: Surat

Area
  - Total: 7 km^{2} (2.7 sq mi)
- Elevation: 19 m (62 ft)

Languages
  - Official: Gujarati, Hindi
- Time zone: UTC+5:30 (IST)
- Telephone code: 02621
- Vehicle registration: GJ5
- Website: gujaratindia.com

Sayan is a Village and municipality in the Surat district in the Indian state of Gujarat. It is one of the primary industrial area of Surat Metropolitan Region. Sayan is located on NH 228 only 18 km from Surat. Sayan is also connected by state highway with Kathor village on NH-8. It is famous for its sugar factories. The majority of the population residing in Sayan are the native Kolis.

== Demographics ==
As of the 2016 Sayan had a total population of 12,856. Males outnumbered females by 7,258 to 5,598. Sayan has an average literacy rate of 100%, higher than the national average of 69.3% in 2011. In Sayan, 14% of the population is under 6 years of age. Sayan is an industrial suburb of Surat.

== See also ==
- List of tourist attractions in Surat
