= Prabhaben Shah =

Indian social worker (1930–2023)

- Born: 20 February 1930; Sayan, Gujarat, India
- Died: 18 January 2023 (aged 92); Daman, India
- Known for: Social work
- Children: 3
- Awards: Padma Shri (2022)

Prabhaben Shah (20 February 1930 – 18 January 2023) was an Indian social worker. In 2022, she was awarded Padma Shri by the Indian Government for her contribution in social work.

== Career ==
Shah decided to be a social worker at the age of 12. She had established a Gujarat medium primary school Bal Mandir. In 1963, she established the women named Mahila Mandal. She had also helped needy people during Kutch earthquake in 2001, and Kerala flood in 2018.

== Personal life and death ==
Shah was from Daman and Diu. She died from heart disease on 18 January 2023, at the age of 92.

== Awards ==
- Padma Shri in 2022
