= Polali Jayarama Bhat =

Indian banker (1951–2023)

P. Jayarama Bhat
- Born: 14 November 1951; Mangalore, Madras State, India
- Died: 9 August 2023 (aged 71)
- Education: Polali Vidya Vilas School; Board High School Gurupur; St. Aloysius College, Mangalore
- Occupations: Former CEO and MD, later Part-time Non-Executive Chairman at Karnataka Bank Limited
- Spouse: Shubha Bhat
- Children: 2
- Parent: Polali Vasudeva Bhat

Polali Jayarama Bhat (14 November 1951 – 9 August 2023) was an Indian banker who was the managing director (MD) and chief executive officer (CEO) of Karnataka Bank, a major Indian commercial bank in the private sector.

== Early life ==
Polali Jayarama Bhat was born on November 14, 1951, in Mangalore, Dakshina Kannada. He was an alumnus of Polali Vidya Vilas School, Board High School Gurupur and St. Aloysius College, Mangalore. He completed his MSc from Mysore University in 1972 with a first rank. After successfully appearing for the CAIIB examination in the year 1986, he served as a lecturer at Government Junior College, Mulki for a brief period of three months in 1972.

== Career ==
Bhat's career in banking began after he joined Karnataka Bank Limited in 1973 as a probationary officer. In 1976 he became a Branch Manager and served various branches for 14 years. He was promoted to chief accountant at the Bank's head office in the year 1993. Bhat was later appointed Assistant General Manager and Deputy General Manager and was elevated to the post of Chief General Manager in 2005. He was appointed Managing Director & CEO of the Bank on 14 July 2009. On completion of his 2nd term he had been re-appointed for a third consecutive term of three years w.e.f. 14.07.2015.

Bhat had rich experience in all facets of banking operations. He was on the Board of Universal Sompo General Insurance Company Ltd., a joint venture of the Bank, from 2007 to 2009.

Jayarama Bhat was a member of the Management Committee of the Indian Banks Association (IBA) from August 2010 to August 2014, during which period he was also the chairman of 'IBA Committee on Member Private Sector Banks'. He was a member of IBA Standing Committee on Retail Banking. During his tenure as managing director, the bank has secured many awards in the field of IT, CSR, MSME, etc.

Bhat was the honorary president of Bankers' Club in Mangaluru. He was conferred with several awards including the Aryabhata International Award and the Outstanding Manager Award by Mangalore Management Association and the A. Shama Rao Memorial Outstanding Achievement Award. He was awarded T. A. Pai Memorial Shrestha Banker award by Delhi Kannadiga. He has also been awarded CEO with HR Orientation by Asia Pacific HRM Congress. He was bestowed with the New Year Award-2015 jointly by Manipal University, Academy of General Education and Syndicate Bank.

== Personal life ==
Bhat was married to his wife Shubha Bhat. The couple had two children; a son and a daughter. He was known to have been a fan of carnatic music, cricket, and badminton.

Bhat died on 9 August 2023, at the age of 71 from a heart attack.
