= Zaverilal Mehta =

Indian photographer (1927–2023)

Zaverilal Dalpatram Mehta
- Born: 1927; Gujarat, India
- Died: 27 November 2023 (aged 96); Ahmedabad, Gujarat, India
- Occupation: Photographer
- Awards: Padma Sri (2018)

Zaverilal Dalpatram Mehta (1927 – 27 November 2023) was an Indian photographer and the recipient of the Padma Sri civilian award in 2018 for his contribution to the fields of literature and educational journalism.

== Career ==
Zaverilal Mehta was associated with Gujarat Samachar from the 1980s onwards. He was popular for documenting the life and times of 13 Chief Ministers of Gujarat state, and his lenses captured incidents such as the 2001 earthquake and the 1998 Kutch cyclone.

In 2018, Zaverilal Mehta was honoured with the Padma Shri award by the President of India, Ram Nath Kovind.

== Death ==
Zaverilal Mehta died on 27 November 2023, at the age of 96.
