= Shahi Masjid, Allahabad =

Mosque in Allahabad, Uttar Pradesh, India

Shahi Masjid
- مسجد شاهی
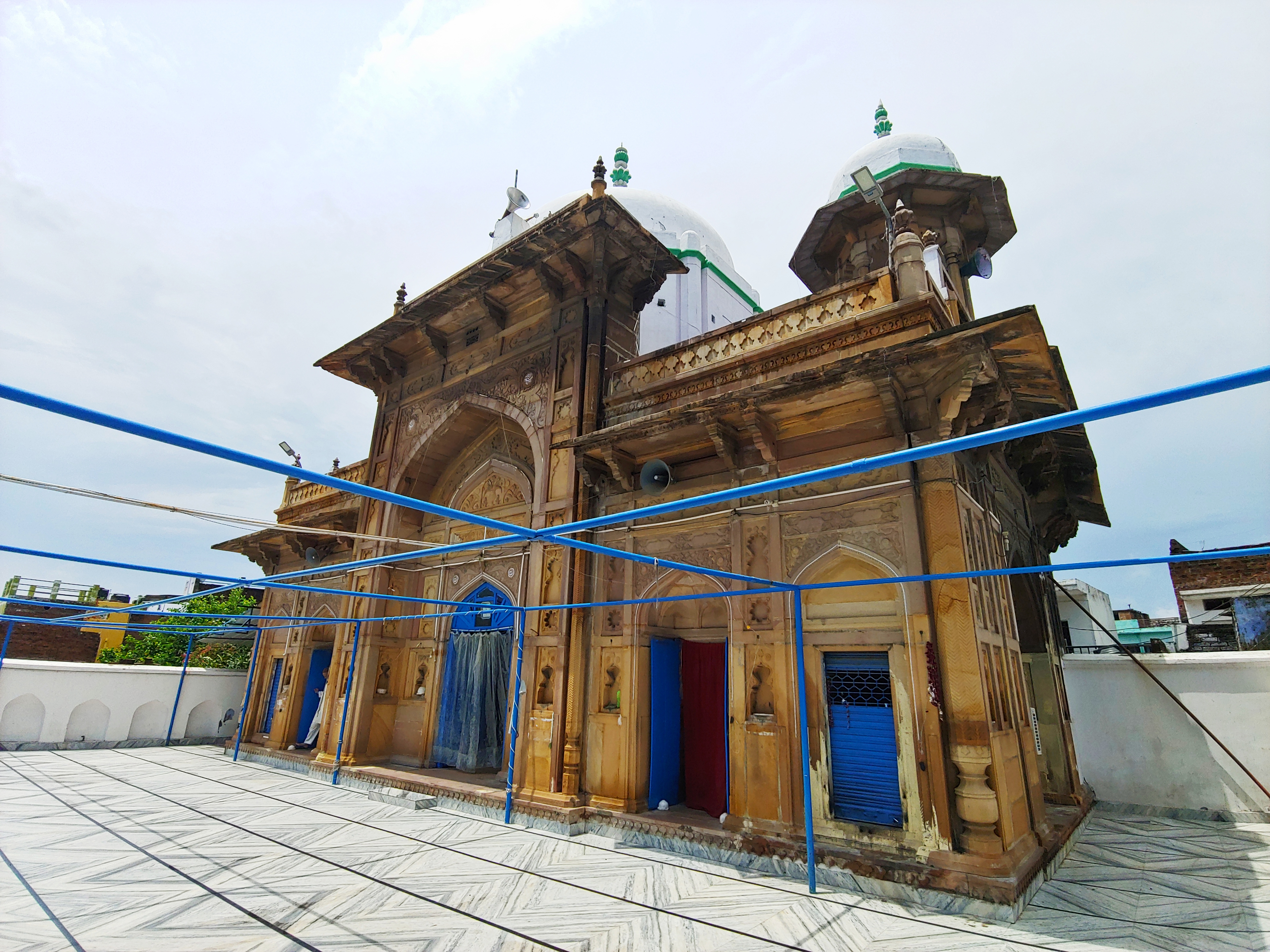
- The mosque in 2019

- Location of the mosque in Uttar Pradesh

Religion
- Affiliation: Islam
- Ecclesiastical or organisational status: Mosque 1643-present
- Status: Active

Location
- Location: Bahadurganj, Allahabad, Uttar Pradesh
- Country: India
- Coordinates: 25°26′09″N 81°50′47″E

Architecture
- Type: Mosque architecture
- Style: Indo-Islamic; Mughal
- Creator: Dara Shikoh
- Funded by: Dara Shikoh
- Established: 1643
- Completed: 1643 CE
- Dome: Three

The Shahi Masjid ( Persian: مسجد شاهی), (Urdu: شاہ مسجد) is a Mughal mosque, located in the Bahadurganj area of Allahabad in the state of Uttar Pradesh, India. It was established in 1643 CE, by the Mughal prince Mirza Dara Shikoh. A similarly named mosque, the Shahi Masjid in the area of Saidabad, was demolished on 9 January 2023, as part of a road-widening project.

== History ==
The masjid was constructed in 1643 by Mirza Dara Shikoh, son of the Mughal Emperor Shah Jahan. The mosque is the oldest Mughal mosque in Allahabad.

A similarly named mosque in the Saidabad area was built during the short rule of Emperor Sher Shah Suri, and that mosque was demolished in early 2023 during a road-widening project.

A much older and larger Jameh Masjid built by Emperor Akbar was demolished after the rebellion of 1857. Beforehand it was used as the residence of the British in Allahabad.

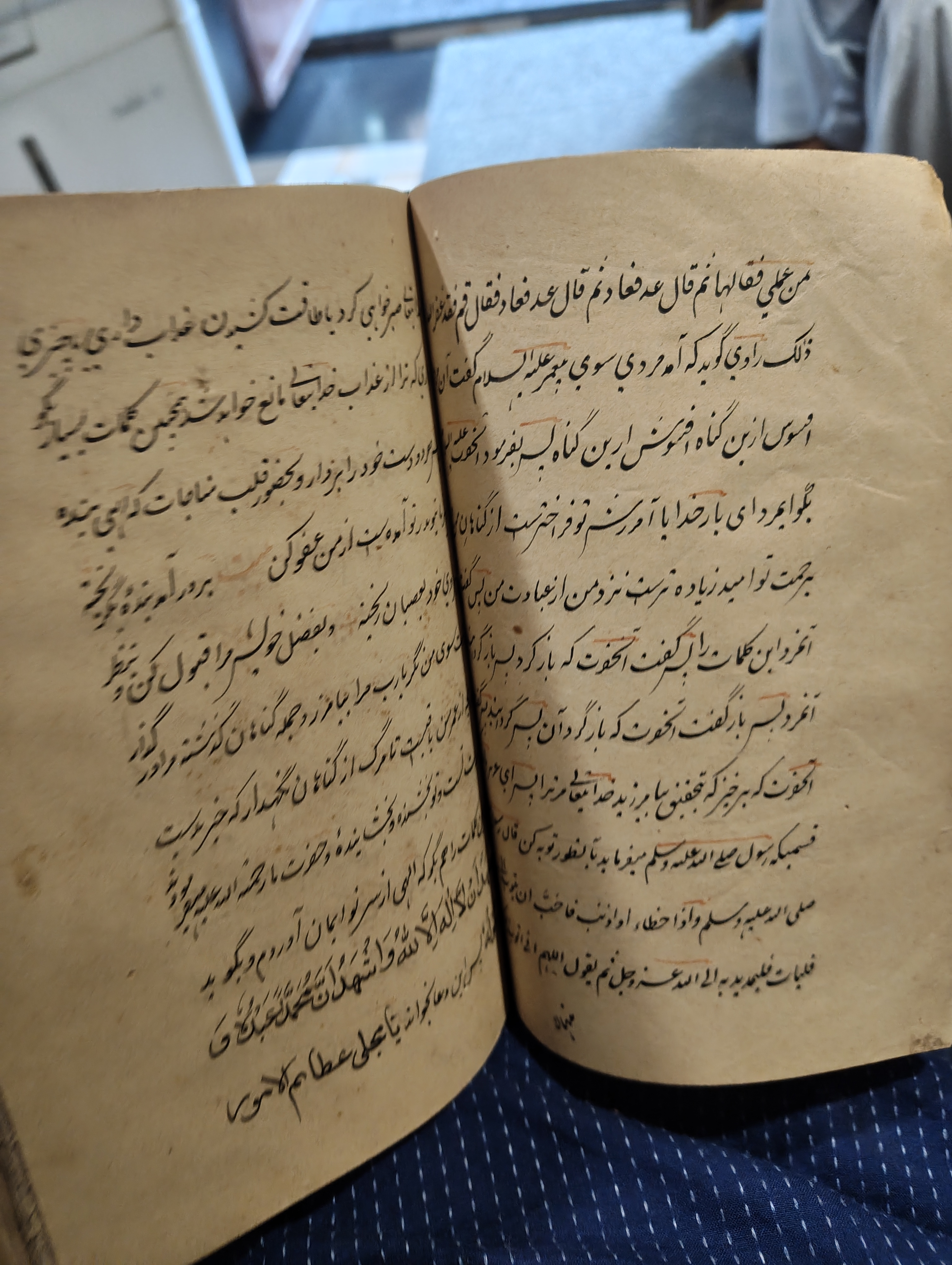
A very old book containing Persian Nastaliq script dating back to the time of Dara Shikoh.

Many old books are kept in the mosque's library, managed by the Imam of the Shahi Masjid, Ali Mian. Some of these old books date back to the time of Dara Shikoh himself. His library contains Urdu, Persian, and Arabic literature, most written in the Nastaliq script. Many people live and work near the Masjid, and the street where it is on hosts the old house and office of Haji Lal Muhammad Biri Tobacco Works, a well-known tobacco company famous across North India. Lal Muhammad's sons, Haji Abdul Majid and Haji Abdul Ghafoor, died before much could be done for the company, yet it reached its climax under one Haji Abdul Hameed, son of Abdul Majid. This man was heavily built, being called "Pehlawan" by his family and associates, an Urdu word of Persian influence meaning "wrestler". However, after the death of Abdul Hamid in 1981, the 24 year old Rafat Anwar Hameed, who many say was the exact copy of his father, was given the entire Haji Lal Muhammad Biri Tobacco Works company, a mantle which he carried stoically for 38 years, until his untimely demise in 2015 at the young age of 58. His scheming brothers and nephews fought amongst themselves over the family's land and properties, splintering the company among themselves. Haji Abdul Hameed's only daughter, Qudsia Hameed, stayed clear of the brotherly dispute, and only acquired what was rightfully hers, the aptly named Qudsia Manzil, formally known as Feroze Manzil, before she moved to Canada. She is the only remaining child of Haji Abdul Hameed. Now, the Hameed family has been split up, with the sons of Feroz and Tanvir have the most remaining influence, due to the Hameed properties being illegally acquired without consent of other members of the family. The house of Lal Muhammad, Qudsia Manzil, has fallen into a state of dilapidation and disrepair. The remaining progeny of Lal Muhammad are all dead now, but their children and widows still fight over the properties.

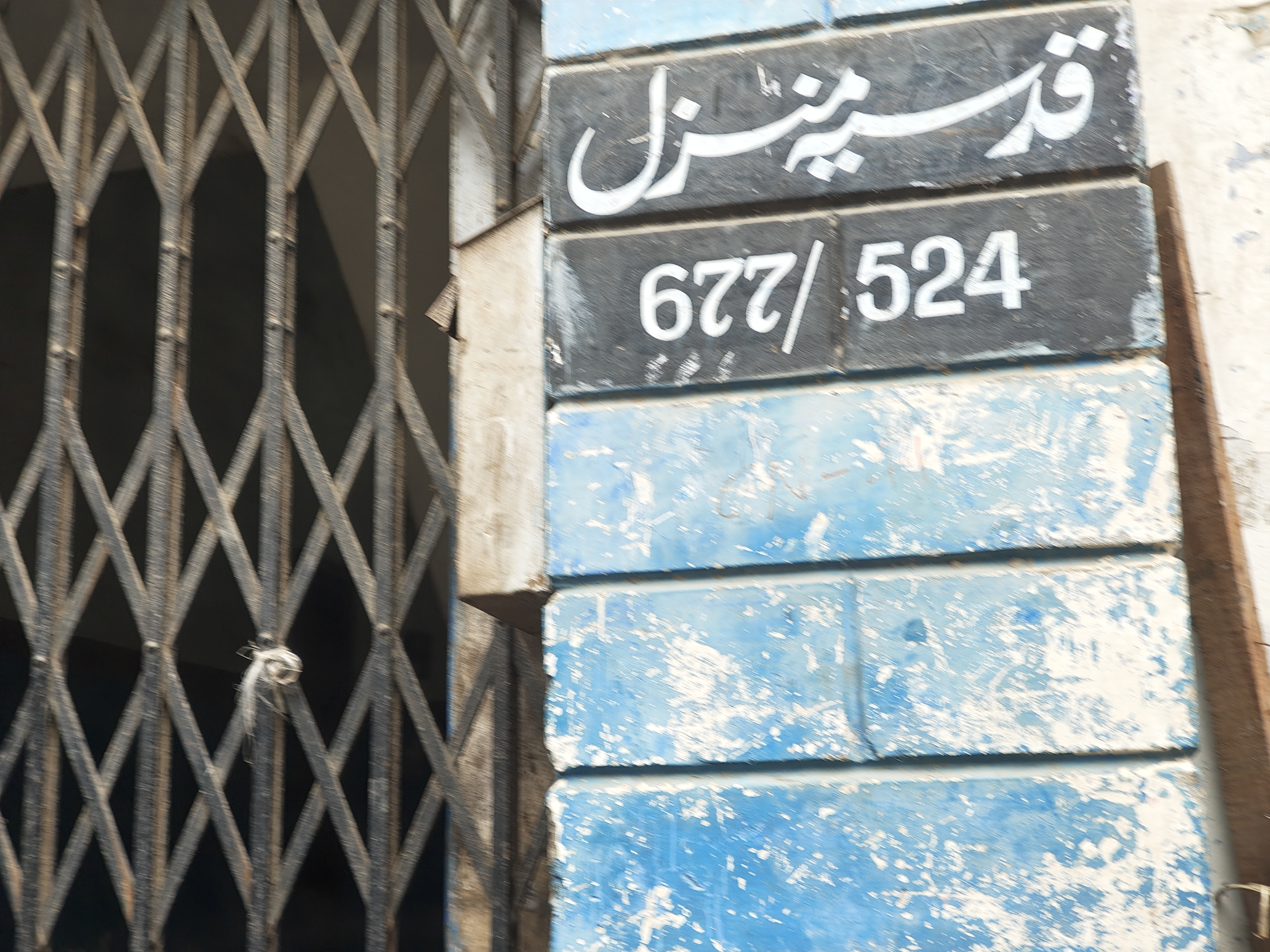
Qudsia Manzil, an old house belonging to the aristocratic Hameed family.

== Gallery ==
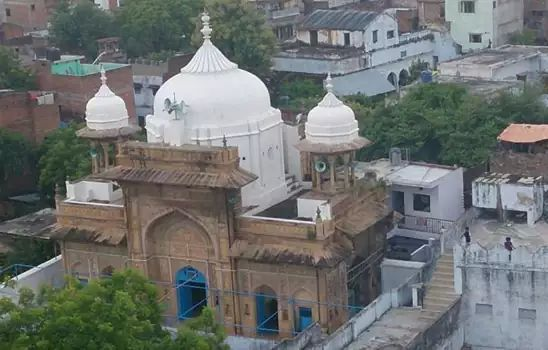
Aerial view of the mosque with one large and two small domes

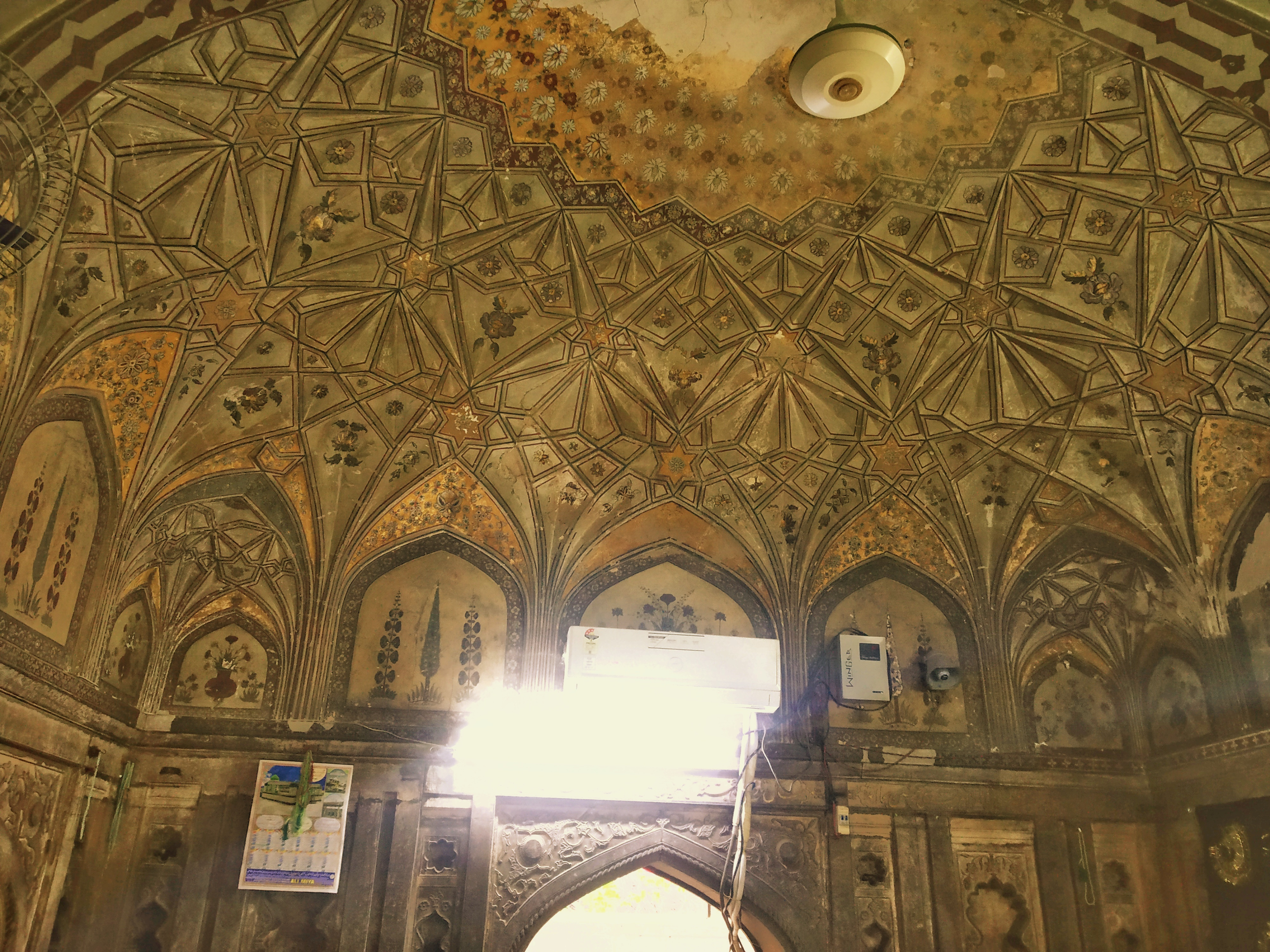
Dome interior of the mosque

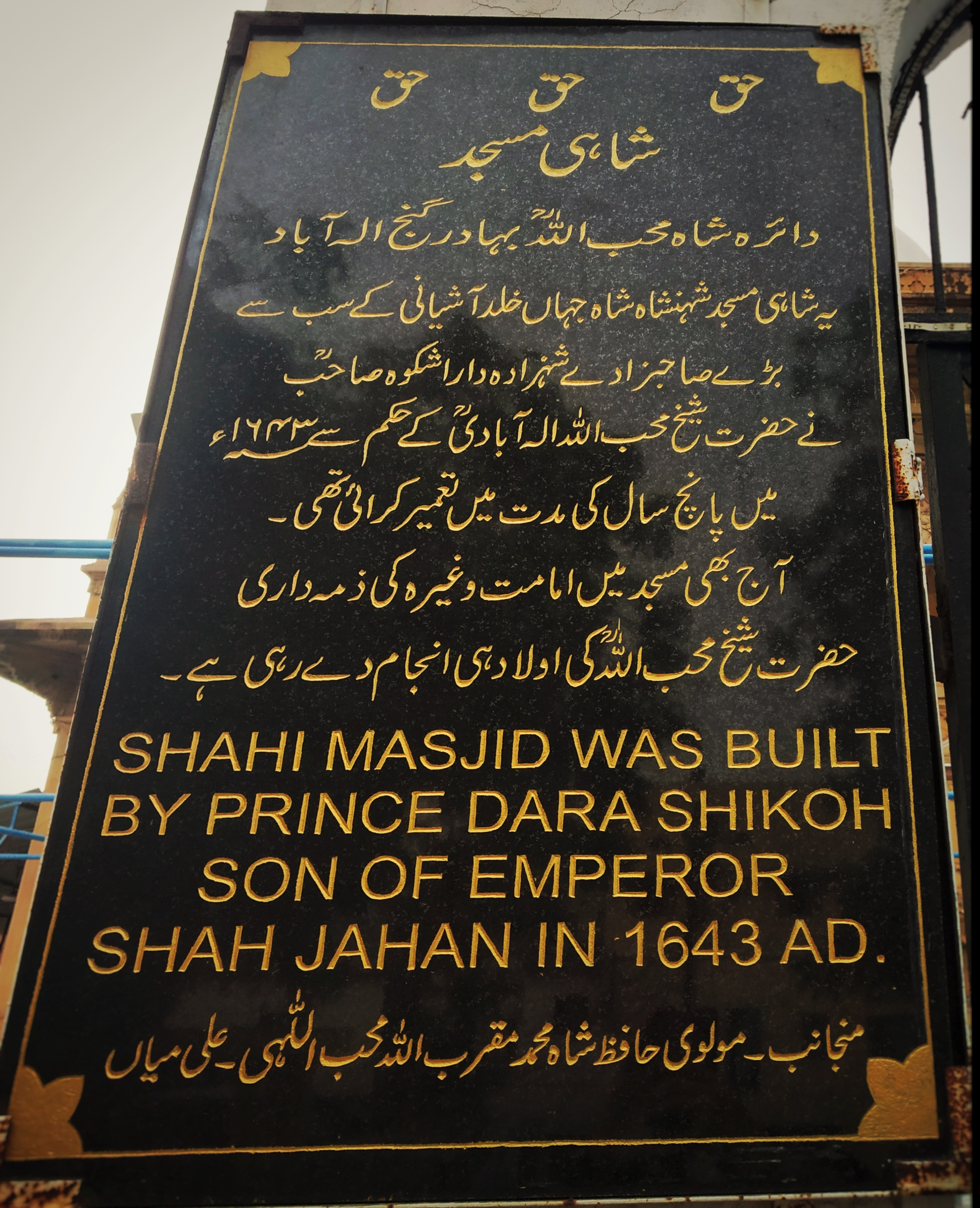
Inscription

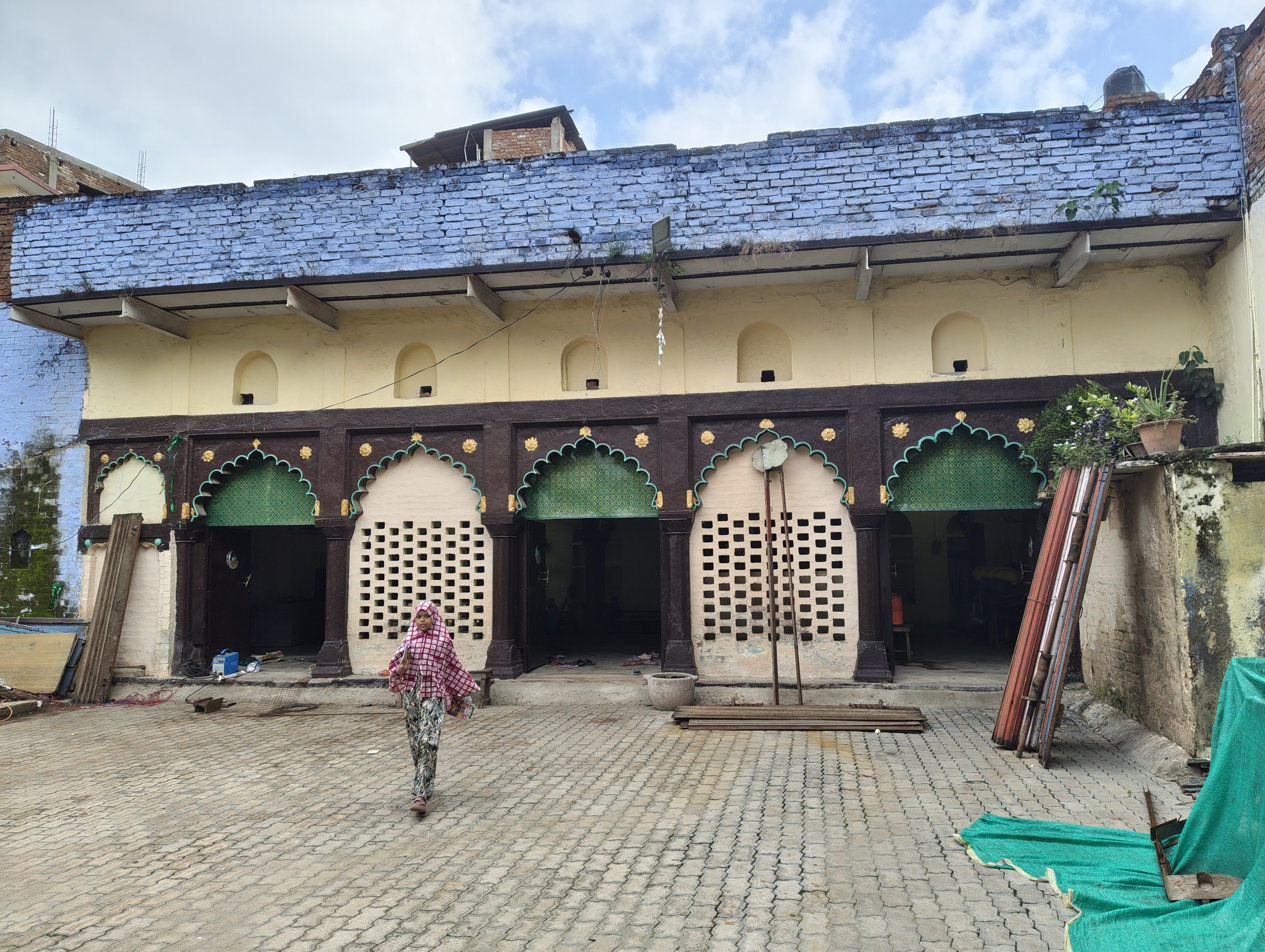
The Shahi Masjid's Madrasa, with Rajput-style scalloped arches.

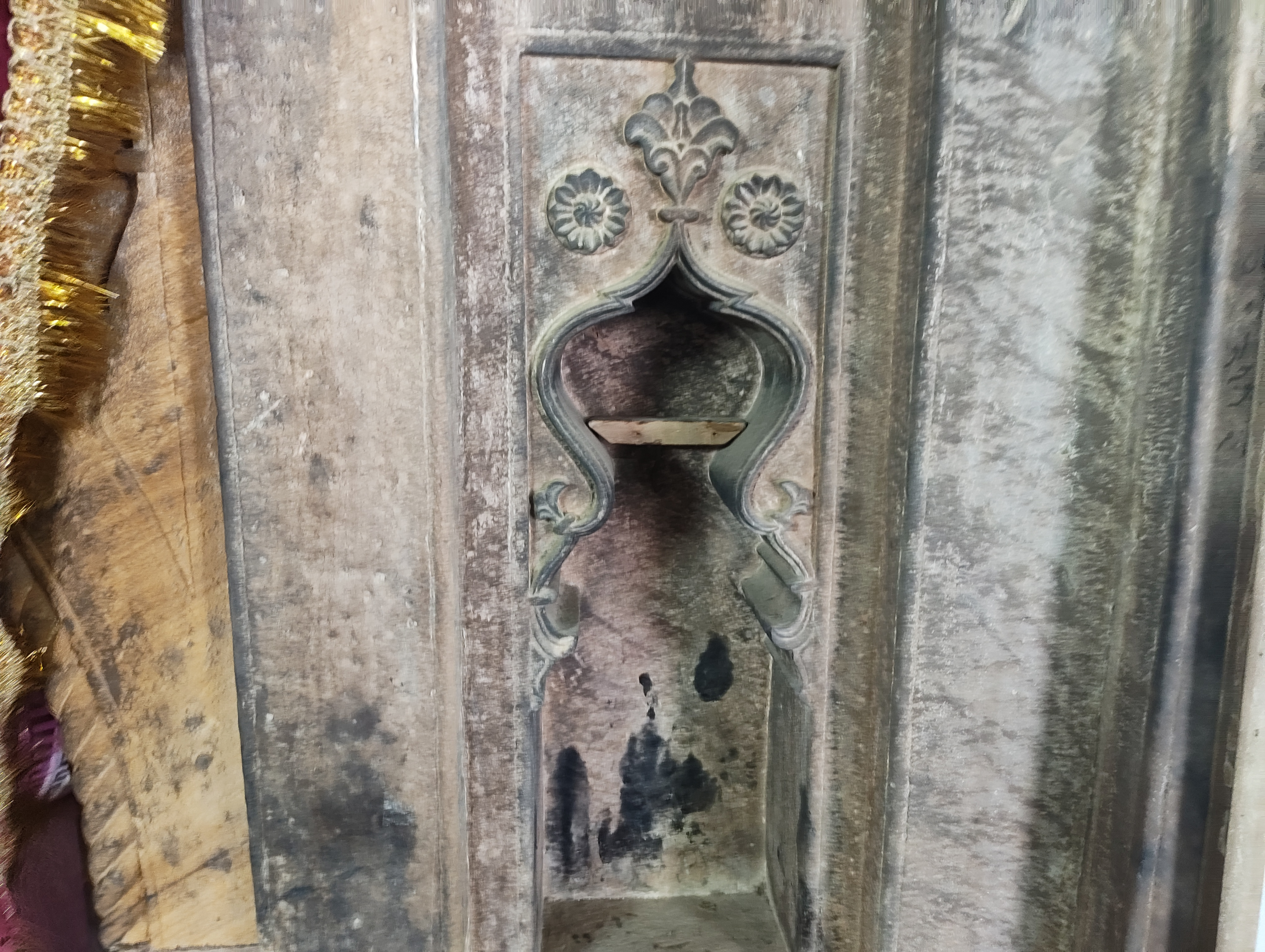
A carved niche in the wall of the interior of the Shahi Masjid, next to the Mihrab.

== See also ==
- Islam in India
- List of mosques in India
