= Shreyas Hareesh =

Indian motorcycle racer (2010–2023)

Copparam Shreyas Hareesh (26 July 2010 – 5 August 2023) was an Indian racing rider. He won the inaugural MiniGP India series in September 2022. Hareesh made his National debut in 2021 and got a podium and a victory in his very first year. At the Uttar Pradesh Global Investors Summit 2023 in Lucknow, he was felicitated by prime minister Narendra Modi on 10 February 2023.

== Early life ==
Hareesh was born in Bengaluru to Copparam Parandaman Hareesh and Sandhya Jayanthi S. He was studying Class 7 in Kensri School in Bengaluru.

== Motorsports career ==
Hareesh started his professional motorsports career in 2021 after dabbling with Supercross in 2019. In his first appearance, he won a private event at Adichunchanagiri Mutt in Hassan when he was nine. Hareesh made his National debut in the MRF MMSC fmsci Indian National Motorcycle Racing Championship in 2021. After he failed to finish (DNF) the first race, he went on to win two races and bagged a third place five times, to finish second in the Championship behind Jinendra Kiran Sangave, the winner. He clocked the fastest lap in six of the ten races, In 2022, he also entered the MMSC fmsci Indian National Motorcycle Drag Racing Championship and won a race. In September 2022, he became the first FIM MiniGP India Champion beating the early leader Jinendra Sangave. Both of them represented India in the FIM MiniGP World Finals at Valencia from 2 to 3 November. In 2023, he won the first four races in the TVS one-make Rookie class. He was scheduled to take part in the Malaysian Superbikes Championship at Sepang in August 2023 for team CRA Motorsports in the 250cc category.

== Death ==
Hareesh died on 5 August 2023 after a crash in the third round of the MRF MMSC fmsci Indian National Motorcycle Racing Championship in the Rookie category of the TVS one-make championship race at the Madras International Circuit. He was cremated at the Hebbal Crematorium in Bengaluru on 7 August 2023 after a ceremony at his residence in Sahakaranagar where family and friends paid their last respects.
