= Ved Kumari Ghai =

Indian Sanskrit scholar (1931–2023)

Ved Kumari Ghai (16 December 1931 – 30 May 2023) was an Indian Sanskrit scholar from Jammu City, Jammu and Kashmir. She was head of the Sanskrit department in Jammu University.

== Early life ==
Ghai was born on 16 December 1931, in Pratap Garh Mohallah, Jammu. She completed her school education in Jammu. She completed her MA in Sanskrit from Punjab University in 1953 and MA in Ancient Indian History and Culture in 1958 and PhD in Sanskrit in 1960 from Banaras Hindu University.

== Career ==
Ghai started her career as a professor of Sanskrit at Government College for Women, Parade, Jammu. She was a head of post graduate level Sanskrit Department, Jammu University until her retirement on 31 December 1991. She taught Panini’s Sanskrit grammar and literature at the Institute of Indian Studies, Copenhagen University, Denmark in 1966–1967 and 1978–1980. She was a scholar in Dogri language and also knew Hindi. She was also involved in social work. She was a member of the Amarnath shrine board.

== Personal life and death ==
Ghai married Dr. Ram Pratap, who was also a Sanskrit scholar. Ghai died on 30 May 2023, at the age of 91.

== Recognition ==
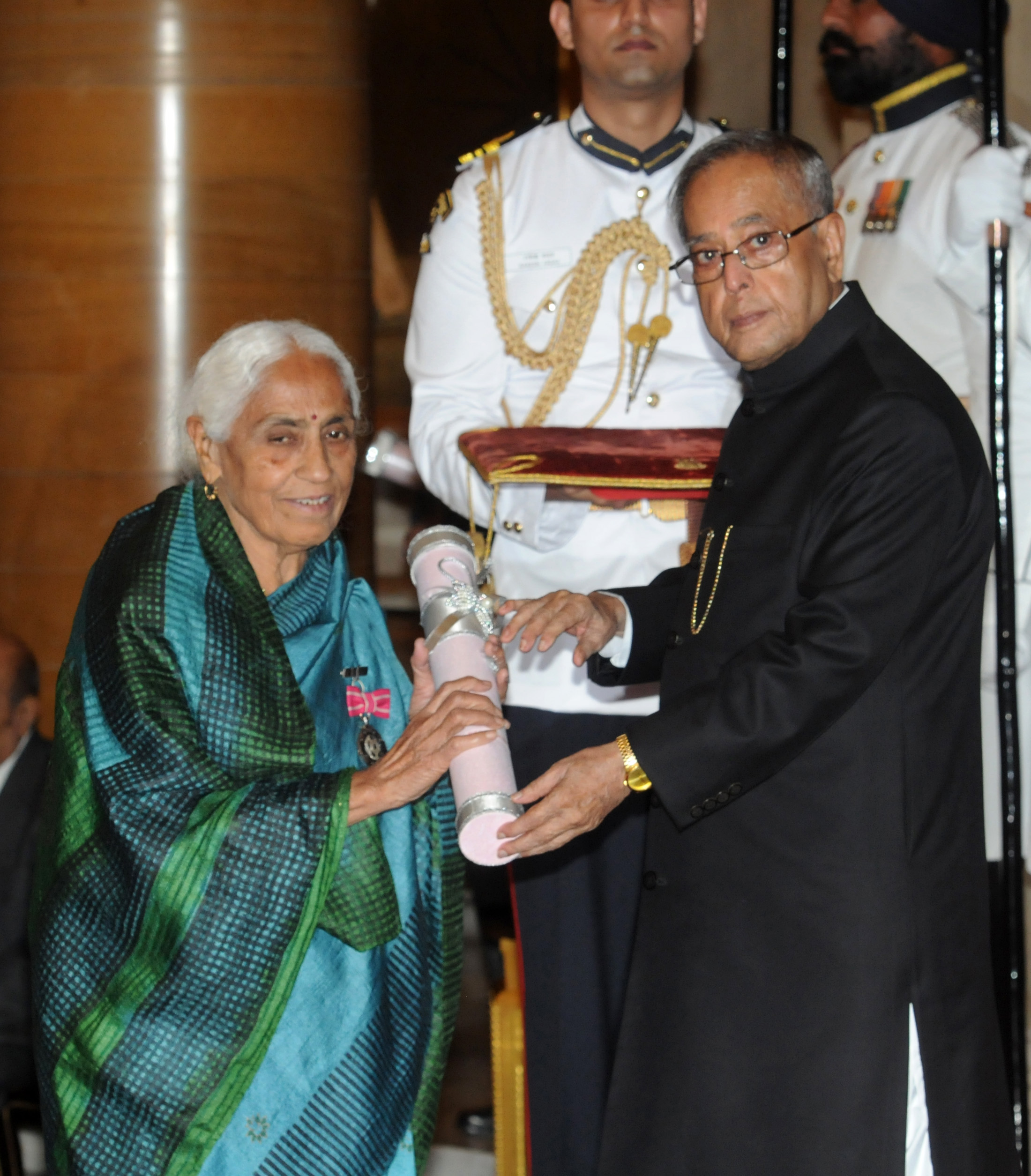
President Shri Pranab Mukherjee presenting the Padma Shri Award to Prof. Ved Kumari Ghai, at a Civil Investiture Ceremony, at Rashtrapati Bhavan, in New Delhi on 31 March 2014

- Padma Shri, the fourth highest civilian award in India, in 2014.
- Certificate of Honour by President of India for her scholarship in Sanskrit.
- Gold Medal in 1995 by Jammu and Kashmir Government for social work.
- President's Award for Sanskrit in 1997.
- Dogra Ratan award in 2005, lifetime achievement award in 2009 and Stri Shakti Puraskara in 2010.
