= Des Raj Kali =

Punjabi writer and journalist (1971–2023)

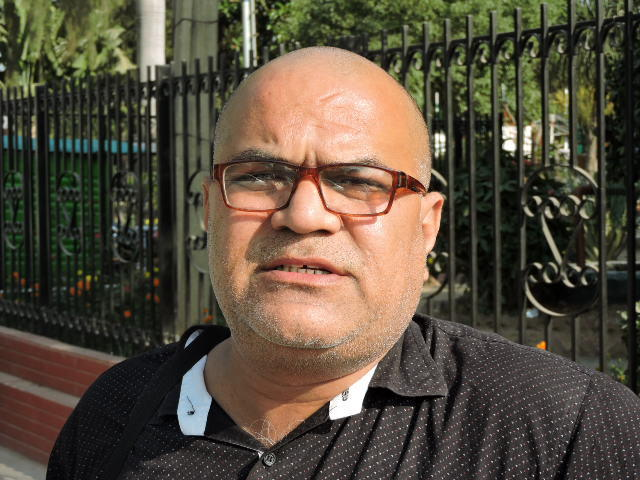
- Born: 1971 Mithapur, Jalandhar district, Punjab, India
- Died: 27 August 2023 (aged 52) Chandigarh, India
- Occupation: Writer, journalist

Des Raj Kali (1971 – 27 August 2023) was an Indian Punjabi writer and journalist. He is known for celebrating his Dalit identity through his works.

== Early life ==
Des Raj Kali was born in Mithapur village in Jalandhar district. His father Niranjan Das worked at moulding factory. As a child, he was influenced by the Indian epics of Mahabharata and Ramayana along with the Punjabi Qissa poetry.

== Literary career ==
His writing career started when his short-story Chanan Di Leek got published in Nagmani. He started getting recognition as a young short-story writer foregrounding the Dalit experience along with Bhagwant Rasulpuri and Jinder.

In 1996, his first collection of short-stories Kath Kali was published. His second short-story collection titled Fakiri was published in 2006. His 2015 short-story collection Yahan Chai Achhi Nahi Banti is believed to have established him as an experimental writer.

In 2010, he was one of the six Dalit writers to be featured at the Jaipur Literature Festival. He has also been a part of special sessions in Nottingham Trent University, University of Montpellier, and Monash University.

Kali was a part of the Punjabi jury for Sahitya Akademi's Bal Sahitya Puraskar award for 2019. His books have been translated into Hindi, Urdu, English, Bengali, Tamil, Kashmiri, Gujarati and Rajasthani.

== Personal life ==
Kali suffered from a liver ailment in later life, and died at PGIMER, Chandigarh on 27 August 2023. He is survived by his wife, and three children.

== Works ==
=== Short-story collections ===
- Kath Kali (Stories of Kali) - 1996
- Fakiri (Mendicancy) - 2006
- Yahan Chai Achhi Nahi Banti (Good Tea is Not Served Here) - 2015

=== Novels ===
- Antheen (Eternal)
- Pratham Pauran (First Puran)
- Shanti Parav (English translation: Treatise on Peace)
- Shehar Vich Sahn Honn da Matlab (What It Means to be a Bull in the Town)

== Awards ==
- Shah Chaman Yadgari award (2018)
- Harnam Das Sehrai award (2022)
