= Hari Narke =

Indian scholar (1963–2023)

- Born: 1 June 1963; Talegaon Dhamdhere, Pune district, Maharashtra, India
- Died: 9 August 2023 (aged 60); Mumbai, Maharashtra, India
- Occupations: Scholar, author, and orator
- Years active: 1980–2023
- Spouse: Sangita Narke
- Website: https://harinarke.blogspot.com

Hari Narke (1 June 1963 – 9 August 2023) was an Indian scholar, author, and orator. He was a professor and the head of Chair of Mahatma Jotirao Phule at the University of Pune.

== Biography ==
Hari Narke was born in Talegaon Dhamdhere, Pune, Maharashtra, on 1 June 1963, to Ramchandra and Sonabai Narke. Coming from a very poor Mali caste family, his education took place mostly in Pune; he completed his education while working in a graveyard. He was married to Sangita, with whom he had a daughter Pramiti.

Narke died of a heart attack at the Asian Heart Institute in Mumbai, on 9 August 2023, at the age of 60.

== Publications ==
Narke wrote or edited 35 books on various issues, but most notably on "Mahatma" Jotirao Phule and the Dalit movement of B. R. Ambedkar.

Marathi

- Mahatma Phule yanchi Badnaami: Ek Satyashodhan
- Dnyanajyoti Savitribai Phule (second edition)
- OBC chya Bhavitavyavar Kurhad
- Dalit Sahityachya Shodhat (Published at the hands of the then President of India K.R. Narayanan)
- Mahatma Phule Shodhachya Navya Vata (Fifth edition)

Hindi

- Mahatma Phule Sahitya aur Vichaar - Published at the hands of the then President of India, Dr. Shankar Dayal Sharma
- Mahatma Phule Samasta Sahitya - Vols. 1 to 4

English

- Editor of Dr. Babasaheb Ambedkar: Writings and Speeches, Vols. 17 to 22
- Collected Works of Mahatma Phule, Vols. 1 to 3

== Speeches ==
Narke delivered 6,000 lectures in the last 30 years, including lectures at London, Birmingham, Manchester, Bedford, Dubai, Sharjah, Abu Dhabi, Al-ain, Kathmandu, and Lumbini.

== Television series ==
- The television serials Dr. Babasaheb Ambedkar: Mahamanvachi Gauravgatha and Ek Mahanayak: Dr. B. R. Ambedkar are based on Narake's research.

== Other offices ==
- Member-secretary of Mahatma Phule Source Material Publication Committee, Government of Maharashtra, Mantralaya, Mumbai.
- Member of Maharashtra State Commission for Backward Classes.
