= Shirish Kanekar =

Indian Marathi writer (1943–2023)

- Born: 6 June 1943
- Died: 25 July 2023 (aged 80); Mumbai, Maharashtra, India
- Occupation(s): Stage performer, writer, journalist
- Years active: 1968–2023

Shirish Kanekar (6 June 1943 – 25 July 2023) was an Indian Marathi writer and stage performer from Maharashtra. He worked as a journalist for an English language newspaper. Shirish Kanekar served 'Indian Express' [2] (1968 to 1980), 'Daily' (1980 to 1982), 'Free Press Journal' (1982–1985), and 'Syndicated Press News Agency' (1985–1989). He continued to write articles in Marathi newspapers and performed stage shows in later years.

Shirish Kanekar was known for his books on cricket, Bollywood cinema and humour.

Kanekar died in Mumbai on 25 July 2023, at the age of 80.

== Publications ==
=== Books ===
The following is a partial list of his books:

- इरसालकी
- खटलं आणि खटला
- गाये चला जा
- गोतावळा
- चापलूसकी
- चापटपोळी
- फटकेबाजी
- लगाव बत्ती
- सूरपारंब्या
- चहाटळकी
- साखरफुटाणे
- रहस्यवल्ली l
- मखलाशी
- मनमुराद
- डॉलरच्या देशा
- एकला बोलो रे
- माझी फिल्लमबाजी
- यादोंकी बारात
- पुन्हा यादों की बारात
- गोली मार भेजे मे
- वेचक शिरीष कणेकर
- कटटा
- मी माझं मला (आत्मचरित्र)

=== Stage shows ===
The stage shows performed by him,

- माझी फिल्लमबाजी
- फटकेबाजी
- कणेकरी
