= Himangshu Mohan Choudhury =

Indian civil servant (died 2023)

- হিমাংশু মোহন চৌধুরী
- Born: 1941; Gangtok, Kingdom of Sikkim, British Raj
- Died: 25 April 2023 (aged 81 or 82)
- Occupation: Civil servant
- Awards: Padma Shri; Outstanding Friend of Bangladesh Award

Himangshu Mohan Choudhury (1941 – 25 April 2023) was an Indian civil servant who was credited with efforts in providing relief to refugees and army deserters during the Bangladesh Liberation War in 1971. While working as the sub-divisional officer at Sonamura in the Indian border state of Tripura, Choudhury is reported to have supervised the task of providing food and shelter to over 250,000 refugees. He was honoured by the Government of India in 1972 with Padma Shri, the fourth-highest Indian civilian award. The Government of Bangladesh presented him with the Outstanding Friend of Bangladesh honour in 2013.

Choudhury grew up in a family of East Bengali heritage with strong Brahminical roots, and lived in Agartala, the capital of Tripura. His father Soroshi Mohan Choudhury was a reputed doctor in Agartala.

Choudhury died on 25 April 2023, at age 81 or 82.
