= M. A. Ramlu =

Indian academic (1927–2023)

Madisetti Anant Ramlu (12 February 1927 – 6 March 2023) was an Indian academic who was the founder and first Head of the Department of Mining Engineering at the Indian Institute of Technology (IIT) in Kharagpur, from 1958 until 1987, when he retired as the Deputy Director & Acting Director of IIT. He was an expert in the area of mines safety, machinery, and open-cast mining. He received his BS in Mining & Metallurgy from the Banaras Hindu University (BHU) and his PhD in Mining Engineering from Germany (Bergakadamie Clausthal).

M. A. Ramlu was married to Saroja, and had two sons – Dr. Vijay K. Madisetti of Georgia Institute of Technology and Dr. Avanindra Madisetti of Mobius Semiconductors in Irvine, California.

Ramlu was awarded the 2009 S. K. Bose Memorial Teaching Excellence Award by the Mining, Geological, and Metallurgical Institute (MGMI) of India.

Ramlu died on 6 March 2023 at the age of 96.

== Publications ==
- Madisetti Anant Ramlu (1956). Ablagerung von feinem Kohlenstaub in einem Staubversuchsraum unter Tage. Clausthal, Bergak., F. f. Bergbau u. Hüttenw., Diss. v. 16. Juli 1956 (Nur in beschr. Anz. f. d. Aust.).
- Madisetti Anant Ramlu (1991). Mine Disasters and Mine Rescue. Rotterdam: A.A. Balkema. ISBN 90-6191-964-9.
- Madisetti Anant Ramlu (1996). Mine Hoisting. Rotterdam; Brookfield, VT: A.A. Balkema. ISBN 90-5410-298-5.
