= 2023 Jaipur Express killings =

Shooting in Palghar, India

- Location: Palghar, Maharashtra, India
- Date: 31 July 2023; 5:00 AM (23:30 GMT) (IST)
- Target: Muslims
- Attack type: mass shooting, mass murder, hate crime, massacre, terrorist attack
- Deaths: 4
- Injuries: 0
- Perpetrator: Chetan Singh Chaudhary
- Motive: Islamophobia, Revenge for 2008 Mumbai attacks

On 31 July 2023, around 5 AM local time (23:30 GMT) on the Mumbai Central–Jaipur Superfast Express train during its journey from Jaipur to Mumbai a Railway Protection Force (RPF) constable named Chetan Singh (aged 33) discharged a firearm resulting in four people losing their lives, including an Assistant Sub-Inspector (ASI). The incident took place near Palghar, a town in the western state of Maharashtra, approximately two hours away from Mumbai by train.

== Incident ==
According to reports, Singh is alleged to have fired 12 rounds from his service rifle, resulting in the deaths of his colleague and a passenger. Afterward, it was reported that the suspect allegedly committed additional murders in two other train coaches. The victims were identified as RPF ASI Tika Ram Meena, aged 57, Abdul Kadar, aged 64, Asgar Abbas Ali, aged 48, and Syed Saifullah. Three passengers were reported to be of the Muslim faith while Ram Meena is reported to be of the Hindu faith.

During the investigation, it was determined that Railway Protection Force (RPF) Constable Chetan Singh Chaudhary threatened a Muslim woman passenger wearing a burqa, coercing her to say "Jai Mata Di" at gunpoint aboard the Jaipur-Mumbai Central Superfast Express on July 31.

== Aftermath ==
Following the incident, Singh was apprehended by the police after he activated the train's emergency alarm and fled the scene. Divisional Railway Manager Neeraj Kumar informed the media that efforts are underway to reach out to the affected families, and compensation will be provided to the next of kin.

== Reactions ==
After the shooting incident, a video emerged on social media. In the video, Singh can be seen holding a rifle and standing beside a deceased bearded man with blood stains. The man in the video is heard making a statement: "They were being operated from Pakistan, and our media is providing them coverage. They are all aware. But I am telling you, if you wish to live and vote in Hindustan [India], there are only two names to consider - [Prime Minister Narendra] Modi and [Uttar Pradesh Chief Minister Adityanath] Yogi."

Asaduddin Owaisi and Srinivas BV shared the video, denouncing the incident as a "hate crime."
