= Yerra Narayanaswamy =

Indian politician (1931–2023)

Member of Parliament, Rajya Sabha
- In office 1994–1999
- Constituency: Andhra Pradesh

Personal details
- Born: 30 April 1931
- Died: 29 March 2023 (aged 91) Bhimavaram, Andhra Pradesh, India
- Party: Telugu Desam Party

Yerra Narayanaswamy (30 April 1931 – 29 March 2023) was an Indian politician. He was a member of Parliament, representing Andhra Pradesh in the Rajya Sabha the upper house of India's Parliament as a member of the Telugu Desam Party.

Narayanaswamy died on 29 March 2023, at age 91.
