= 2023 Buldhana bus accident =

Fatal fire in Maharashtra, India

2023 Buldhana Bus Accident

Details
- Date: 1 July 2023; 2 AM IST
- Location: Pimpalkhuta Village Sindkhed Raja, Buldhana district, Maharashtra
- Coordinates: 19.997069°N 76.164424°E
- Country: India
- Operator: Private bus
- Owner: Virendra Darne
- Incident type: caught fire

Statistics
- Bus: Vidarbha Travels
- Passengers: 34
- Deaths: 26
- Injured: 8

On 1 July 2023, a private bus named Vidarbha Travels travelling on Mumbai–Nagpur Expressway in Maharashtra's Buldhana district in India caught fire. 25 people died, and eight others were injured, in the accident.

== Accident ==
The accident took place on a bus named Vidarbha Travels that was travelling on the Mumbai–Nagpur Expressway in Pimpalkhuta Village near Sindkhed Raja, Buldhana district, Maharashtra. The bus was being driven from Nagpur to Pune. According to reports, the bus hit a pole on the expressway, overturned, and the diesel tank caught fire. Because the bus was overturned on its left side, the passenger exit was blocked. Additionally, the emergency door was not working. The accident happened at about 2 am local time on 1 July 2023. There were 33 passengers on the bus. Most of the passengers were sleeping when the accident happened. 26 of them died and the remaining were injured. Three children died. The survivors escaped by breaking glass panes. The injured were taken to Buldhana Civil Hospital.

== Investigation ==
The investigation of the accident determined that the bus driver, Danish Shaikh, was drunk. According to a chemical analysis report, the percentage of alcohol found in the blood sample of the driver was 0.30%. Shaikh was arrested for negligent driving. After the accident, the Maharashtra Motor Vehicle Department asked the Automotive Research Association of India to review the design and safety measures implemented in sleeper coach buses.

== Response ==
Local rescue and fire brigade teams reached the accident site and extinguished the fire. Chief Minister of Maharashtra Eknath Shinde and Prime Minister of India Narendra Modi expressed their anguish over the accident. The Government of Maharashtra announced a ₹5 lakhs compensation for each of the families of those who died. The government also announced that they will bear the full cost of treatment of the injured. Due to the fire, the bodies were unidentifiable and authorities decided to conduct DNA tests to determine the identity of the victims.
