= Indore stepwell collapse =

2023 disaster in India

- Date: 30 March 2023
- Location: Beleshwar Mahadev Temple, Indore, Madhya Pradesh, India
- Type: Collapse
- Cause: Overcrowding
- Deaths: 36
- Injuries: 16

On 30 March 2023, a stepwell cover in an Beleshwar Mahadev temple in Indore, Madhya Pradesh, India; collapsed during a celebration of Rama Navami, killing at least 36 people and injuring 16.

== Collapse ==
On the occasion of Rama Navami, a large number of Hindus visited Beleshwar Mahadev Temple, which sits atop an unused 40-foot (12 m) stepwell covered by a grill and tiles. The weight of the crowd caused the cover to collapse, according to Shivraj Singh Chouhan, Chief Minister of Madhya Pradesh. The incident resulted in death of 36 people and injuries to other 16.

== Rescue and relief ==
After its collapse, nearly 140 army soldiers helped pull the injured and dead from the well with ropes. Those rescued were brought to a hospital in Indore. Narottam Mishra, a government cabinet minister, said in a statement that water was pumped out of the well in an effort to ease rescue and recovery efforts.

The Prime Minister's Office said that ₹2 lakh (US$2,100) will be given as compensation, while Mishra said that an investigation and compensation to families would be forthcoming.

== Investigation ==
An FIR was lodged against the president and the secretary of the temple trust. The Hindu reported that the stepwell roof was two decades old and was an illegal construction. The Indore Municipal Corporation had asked the temple trust to remove the illegal construction but the temple trust had not complied.

== Reaction ==
Narendra Modi, Prime Minister of India offered his condolences, thoughts, and prayers.

Shivraj Singh Chouhan, Chief Minister of Madhya Pradesh, said "It's an unfortunate incident. A rescue operation is underway. 10 people were rescued safely while nine are still trapped and will be rescued. Efforts are underway to rescue other people."
