= Praful Bhavsar =

Indian space scientist (1926–2023)

Praful D. Bhavsar (17 August 1926 – 30 September 2023) was an Indian space scientist who held several major positions in the Indian Space program including the Project Scientist for the first rocket launch into space from Indian soil on 21 November 1963. In 1986, he retired from the position of Director, Space Applications Centre of the Indian Space Research Organization (ISRO) and the Director, Indian Remote Sensing Satellite Utilization Program.

Bhavsar was born on 17 August 1926, and received his Doctorate in Physics from Gujarat University in 1958 for his research in Cosmic Rays at the Physical Research Laboratory under the guidance of Vikram Sarabhai. In the same year he moved to the University of Minnesota as a research fellow in the laboratory of Professor John R. Winckler to study high altitude Cosmic Rays using balloons. Whilst at Minnesota, Bhavsar also collaborated with Professor Jacques Blamont who would later play a key role in India's first rocket launch.

The Scientific and Technical Sub-committee of the United Nations Committee on the Peaceful Uses of Outer Space (COSPAR) was established in 1958. One of its objectives was to foster international scientific collaboration. In 1962 Indian National Committee for Space Research INCOSPAR was established by the Indian government under the chairmanship of Dr Vikram Sarabhai. One of its first projects was the establishment of the Thumba Equatorial Rocket Launching Station (TERLS) in the district of Trivandrum on the southern tip of India very close to Earth's magnetic equator.

Bhavsar was a student of Dr.Vikram Sarabhai, and at his request returned to India and joined a team of scientists as the project scientist that launched India's first rocket from the Thumba Equatorial Rocket Launching Station (TERLS). The two stage Nike-Apache sounding rocket came from the USA and the French payload that left a vertical trail of sodium vapour in the upper atmosphere from a 100 to 120 km altitude. The primary purpose of this flight was to measure atmospheric winds, temperature, diffusion and turbulence by photographing the trail of the ejected sodium.

Bhavsar held many prestigious positions over the years, including: Scientific Co-ordinator, ISRO (1967–1975); Member-SecretaryINCOSPAR (1970–1981); Chairman – Remote Sensing Area, Space Applications Center (1976–1984); Director, Indian Remote Sensing Satellite Utilization Programme (1981–1986); and Director, Space Applications Center, ISRO (1985–1986).

In 1999 Bhavsar was awarded the Aryabhata Award in recognition of his lifetime achievement in the area of Astronautics by the Astronautical Society of India.

Praful Bhavsar died on 30 September 2023, at the age of 97.

== Publications ==
- Winckler, J. R.; Bhavsar, P. D. "Low-Energy Solar Cosmic Rays and the Geomagnetic Storm of May 12 1959." Journal of Geophysical Research, Vol. 65, (1960) p. 2637–2655.
- Winckler, J. R.; Bhavsar, P. D.; Masley, A. J.; May, T. C. "Delayed Propagation of Solar Cosmic Rays on September 3, 1960." Physical Review Letters, vol. 6, Issue 9, (1961) pp. 488–491.
- Bhavsar, P.D. "Scintillation-Counter Observations of Auroral X Rays during the Geomagnetic Storm of May 12, 1959." Journal of Geophysical Research, vol. 66, issue 3, (1961), pp. 679–692.
- Winckler, J. R.; Bhavsar, P. D.; Peterson, L. "The Time Variations of Solar Cosmic Rays during July 1959 at Minneapolis ." Journal of Geophysical Research, vol. 66, issue 4, (1961), pp. 995–1022.
- Bhavsar, P.D. "Gamma Rays from the Solar-Cosmic-Ray-Produced Nuclear Reactions in the Earth's Atmosphere and Lower Limit on the Energy of Solar Protons Observed at Minneapolis." Journal of Geophysical Research, vol. 67, issue 7, (1962) pp. 2627–2637.
- Winckler, J. R.; Bhavsar, P. D.; Anderson, K. A. "A Study of the Precipitation of Energetic Electrons from the Geomagnetic Field during Magnetic Storms." Journal of Geophysical Research, vol. 67, issue 10, (1962), pp. 3717–3736.
- Kasturirangan, K; Bhavsar, P. D.; Nerurkar, N. W. "Balloon observations of cosmic X rays in the energy range 20–200 kev." Journal of Geophysical Research, Volume 74, Issue 21, (1969), p. 5139–5144.
- Kasturirangan, K.; Rao, U. R.; Bhavsar, P. D. "Low energy atmospheric gamma rays near geomagnetic equator." Planetary and Space Science, Vol. 20, (1972) p. 1961–1977.
- Narayanan, M. S.; Desai, N. J.; Bhavsar, P. D. "Effect of wind and finite exposure in photographic determination of effective radius of luminescent vapour clouds released in the upper atmosphere." Indian Journal of Radio and Space Physics, vol. 4, Mar. 1975, (1975) p. 88–89.
- Narayanan, M. S.; Bhavsar, P. D. "Neutral winds and nighttime F-region." Indian J. Radio Space Phys., Vol. 5, No. 3, (1976) p. 221–224.
- Bhavsar P.D. "Earth survey satellites and cooperative programmes." Advances in Space Research, Volume 3, Issue 7,(1983), p. 139–147.
- Bhavsar P.D. "The importance of remote sensing from space to the Indian subcontinent." International Journal of Remote Sensing, vol. 4, issue 3,(1983), pp. 529–536.
- Bhavsar, P. D. "Review of remote sensing applications in hydrology and water resources management in India." Advances in Space Research, Volume 4, Issue 11, (1984) p. 193–200.
- Bhavsar P.D. "Indian remote-sensing satellite – utilization plan." International Journal of Remote Sensing, vol. 6, issue 3, (1985), pp. 591–597.
