= 2023 Doda bus accident =

2023 bus accident in India

Details
- Date: 15 November 2023; 11:50 IST
- Location: Doda district, Jammu and Kashmir
- Coordinates: 33°07′39″N 75°24′23″E
- Country: India
- Operator: Private bus
- Incident type: Bus plunge

Statistics
- Bus: 1
- Passengers: 54
- Crew: 2
- Deaths: 39
- Injured: 17
- Damage: Bus

On 15 November 2023, 39 people died and 17 more were injured when the driver of a passenger bus lost control and the vehicle plunged into a 300–400 ft (91–122 m) deep gorge in the hilly area of Doda district in Jammu and Kashmir.

== Crash ==
The bus, which had registration number JK02CN-6555, was carrying 54 passengers, a driver and a conductor, when it plunged from the Batote-Kishtwar national highway near Trungal-Assar and fell 300–400 feet (91–122 metres) down a gorge. The bus landed on a disused road, 2.5 miles (4 km) from Rajgarh. The bus was over its 38 passenger capacity, which may have contributed to the driver being unable to negotiate the tight turn.

== Rescue ==
Soon after the incident, Ababeel and Al-Khair Organisation volunteers, along with locals, initiated the rescue operation. They were later joined by the police, SDRF, and other government rescue agencies. Indian Air Force helicopters were called for airlifting the critically wounded.

== Responses ==
Prime Minister Narendra Modi issued a statement expressing distress and extended condolences to the families. He announced compensation payments of Rs. 2 lakh from the Prime Minister's National Relief Fund for each victim and Rs. 50,000 for the injured. Home Minister Amit Shah shared anguish over the loss of lives, conveyed condolences to the families, and acknowledged the ongoing rescue operations by local administration. Lieutenant Governor Manoj Sinha expressed sorrow and offered condolences to the bereaved families. He directed the division commissioner and district administrator to provide assistance.

PDP President Mehbooba Mufti conveyed shock and sadness, offering condolences. She urged expedited rescue operations by the administration. DPAP Chairman Ghulam Nabi Azad emphasized the need for improved road infrastructure and urged support for affected families. He called on Sinha to ensure that necessary assistance is provided.
