= C. L. Porinchukutty =

Indian artist and art educator (1932–2023)

C. L. Porinchukutty (1932 – 19 November 2023) was an Indian artist and art educator. He was born in Thrissur in the erstwhile state of Cochin (now a part of Kerala) in 1932.

== Biography ==
He practised art under the tutelage of veteran artist P. I. Ithoop, a disciple of Abanindranath Tagore. After attaining a Diploma in Painting from the Government of Madras, he took a degree in English literature from the University of Kerala and Post-Graduation in Painting with Gold Medal from the University of Udaipur, Rajasthan.

After working as a faculty in Raja Ravi Varma College of Fine Arts, Mavelikkara and later as Principal; there he was appointed the head of the institution of the erstwhile School of Arts and was invited to be the Project Officer for starting the College of Fine Arts, Thiruvananthapuram.

He retired as the Founder Principal of the College of Fine Arts in Thiruvananthapuram, and has been working since to promote art at various levels.

Porinchukutty served as the Chairman of Kerala Lalit Kala Akademi from 1986 to 1988. After working as Secretary, Lalit Kala Akademi Delhi from 1989 to 1990, he served the Akademi as Vice Chairman three terms consecutively, in 1993, 1999 and from 2002 to 2007. In 2011 Professor Porinchukutty was awarded the Raja Ravi Varma Award by the Government of Kerala in recognition of his contribution to the Kerala Art scene.

Porinchukutty died on 19 November 2023, at the age of 91.
