= C. V. Dev =

Indian actor (1940–2023)

- Born: C. V. Dev; 1940; Vadakara, Malabar District, Madras Province, British India (now Kerala, India)
- Died: 26 June 2023 (aged 83); Kozhikode, Kerala, India
- Occupation: Actor
- Years active: 1959–2016

C. V. Dev (1940 – 26 June 2023) was an Indian actor, who worked in Malayalam cinema and theatre. He acted in many plays and more than 100 Malayalam films in his career spanning over five decades. Dev was also a theatre director and has also directed several dramas.

== Biography ==
Dev was born in 1940 in Vadakara Chemmarathur as the eldest son of Kanaran and Narayani. In 1959, he stepped into the art scene by acting in the play Vilakin Kalayam directed by Sadanandan Kallai. He played notable roles in plays like K. T. Muhammad's Shitti, M. T. Vasudevan's Gopuranatail and P. M. Taj's Agraharam. He has directed many plays including Panan Padatha Pattu. Dev debuted in Malayalam film industry in 1978 through Yaro Oral directed by Pavithran. Chandrotsavam, Mannadiar Penninu Chenkotta Chekkan, English Medium, Urumbugal Urangarilla, Sadayam, Pattabhishekam, Manasinakare, Katha Thudarunnu, Sandesham, Mizhi Randilum and Neerk Nere are some of his notable Malayalam films.

Dev also worked as a B high grade artist in Kozhikode Akashavani. He has received the P.J. Antony Memorial Drama Cinema Acting Pratibha Award and the Kerala Sangeetha Natak Academy Guru Pooja Award. He died on 26 June 2023, at the age of 83.
