= K. Jayaram =

Indian photographer (1949–2023)

K. Jayaram (1949 – 2 July 2023) was an Indian nature photographer and a pioneer in macro photography. His photos have been published in international publications including BBC.

== Biography ==
Jayaram, who started handling the camera in 1962 at the age of fourteen, grew up to be one of the well-known environmental photographers in India. His photography career began in 1963 when he won first prize in a competition. He excelled in capturing images of insects, bugs and insects. He was also interested in botany and taxonomy. He has co-authored a book on butterflies. A frog species (Philautus jayarami) and a jumping spider (Myrmarachne jayaramani) have been named after him. Jayaram has captured more than three lakh pictures from 1969 to 2006. His pictures have been published in several international medias including BBC. His photograph of an insect and a scorpion won the Gold and Silver Medal of the International Salon of Photographs in 1970. In 1978 he became a Fellow of the Royal Photographic Society, UK. He also won an award from the International Federation of Photographic Art in Europe. Jayaram has co-authored books on butterflies of South India and Silent Valley.

Jayaram died on 2 July 2023, at the age of 74.
