= Govindray H. Nayak =

Indian writer (1933–2023)

G. H. Nayak
- ಜಿ.ಎಚ್.ನಾಯಕ
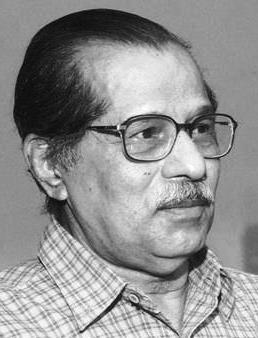
- Born: Govindaray H. Nayak; 18 September 1933; Soorve, Ankola, Bombay Presidency, British India (Now Uttara Kannada, Karnataka, India)
- Died: 26 May 2023 (aged 89); Mysore, Karnataka, India
- Occupations: Professor and writer in Kannada
- Writing career
- Period: 20th Century

Govindaray Hammanna Nayak (18 September 1933 – 26 May 2023) was an Indian writer and academic. A professor of Kannada at University of Mysore, he was awarded the Central Sahitya Akademi Award for his work Sanskrit Chintana in 2014

Nayak was born in Soorve near Ankola, a village in coastal Karnataka, India. In 1951, Nayak earned his high school diploma from Peoples Multi-purpose High School, Ankola and a M. A. in Kannada from University of Mysore.

Nayak died on 26 May 2023, at the age of 89.

== His works ==
- Sanskrit Chintana
- Nirapekshe
- Samakalina
- Nijadani
- Bendre Naada Naadu Olavu
- Moulya Marga (vol 1-5)
- Matte Matte Pampa
- Shathamanada Kannada Sahitya -1
- Harishchandra Kavya Ondu Vimarshe
- Sthitiprajne
- Krithisaakshi

== Awards ==
- Central Sahitya Akademi Award (2014)
- Karnataka Sahitya Academy Award
- Pampa Award
