= John Turner (miser) =

English moneylender (1800–1883)

- Born: 1 March 1800; Ripon, North Riding of Yorkshire, England
- Died: 2 March 1883 (aged 83); Harrogate, England
- Burial place: Grove Road Cemetery, Harrogate
- Monuments: Tall stone monument at Grove Road
- Occupations: Draper; moneylender; landlord
- Years active: c. 1831 – c. 1871
- Known for: Being historically perceived as a miser

John Turner (1 March 1800 – 2 March 1883) was an English draper, landlord, and moneylender, whose behaviour led to his reputation as a miser.

By hard work and self-denial, Turner rose from being a smallholder's son to the position of a draper's assistant and eventually to that of shop owner. He frequently worked shifts that could begin early in the morning on one day end past midnight on the next. He eventually became a rich property owner and sought-after lender to the moneyed residents and visitors of Harrogate. However, his pecunious personal habits drew the attention of local people, who saw him pay in full for buildings and land, but deny himself and his family the comforts of life, and hoard and recycle waste material to make pennies, alongside the great profits he made in his primary occupations.

In the year following Turner's death, a biography comparing him to the miser Daniel Dancer was printed and copied in the British press. A revised and updated version of his biography by Harrogate historian Stephen Abbott was printed in two of his books, and a shorter commentary appeared in The Harrogate Advertiser in the 21st century. A stone memorial to Turner stands in Grove Road Cemetery, Harrogate.

== Background ==
John Turner was born on 1 March 1800, in Aismunderby, Ripon, North Riding of Yorkshire, into a family of smallholders, "who by dint of thrift and hard work had acquired money". (Note: The birth and death dates of Turner, his wife and his son are on Turner's memorial monument at Grove Road Cemetery, Harrogate. These are confirmed by historian Stephen Abbott (as cited below).)

in the late 1830s Turner moved to Ripon for a short period, and had a son John Frances Turner Vant, (Note: John Frances Turner Vant (24 June 1840 – 27 November 1882). GRO index:Births Sep 1840 Turner John Ripon XXIII 489. Deaths Dec 1882 Turner John Francis 42 Knaresbro' 9a 72) with Jane Vant from Ripon, who was possibly his housekeeper, and the child was born in Ripon. In St John the Baptist Church, Knaresborough in 1841 Turner married Jane Vant, daughter of George Vant, a tailor. (Note: Jane Vant (1813 – 15 March 1887). GRO index:Marriages Jun 1841 Vant Jane and Turner John, Knaresbro' 23 257. Deaths Mar 1887 Turner Jane 73 Knaresbro' 9a 78. The marriage certificate says: Knaresborough Parish Church, May 11th 1841. John Turner, bachelor, draper of High Harrogate, son of John Turner, farmer. Jane Vant, spinster of High Harrogate, daughter of George Vant, tailor. Both signed the marriage certificate. Death date and age of Jane Vant confirmed by historian Stephen Abbott (see Harrogate Advertiser 2004 source).) When married, he kept his annual household costs below £20 (equivalent to £2,197.04 in 2025). "He only burned coal that he had found". Stephen G. Abbott comments that "Turner spent little more per head than what [the workhouse master] Henry Peacock was prepared to spend on the workhouse inmates". Turner then moved to Starbeck. The Knaresborough Post describes his home life:

Fire was never used in [Turner's] house except for cooking, and when he could not pick up coal sufficient to supply that requirement he went out into the hedgerows for timber. On returning home from his errands he always divested himself of the suit with which he went abroad, and donned a home suit composed of hundreds of patches of all sizes of material from about 1 to 4 inches (2.5 to 10 cm) square.

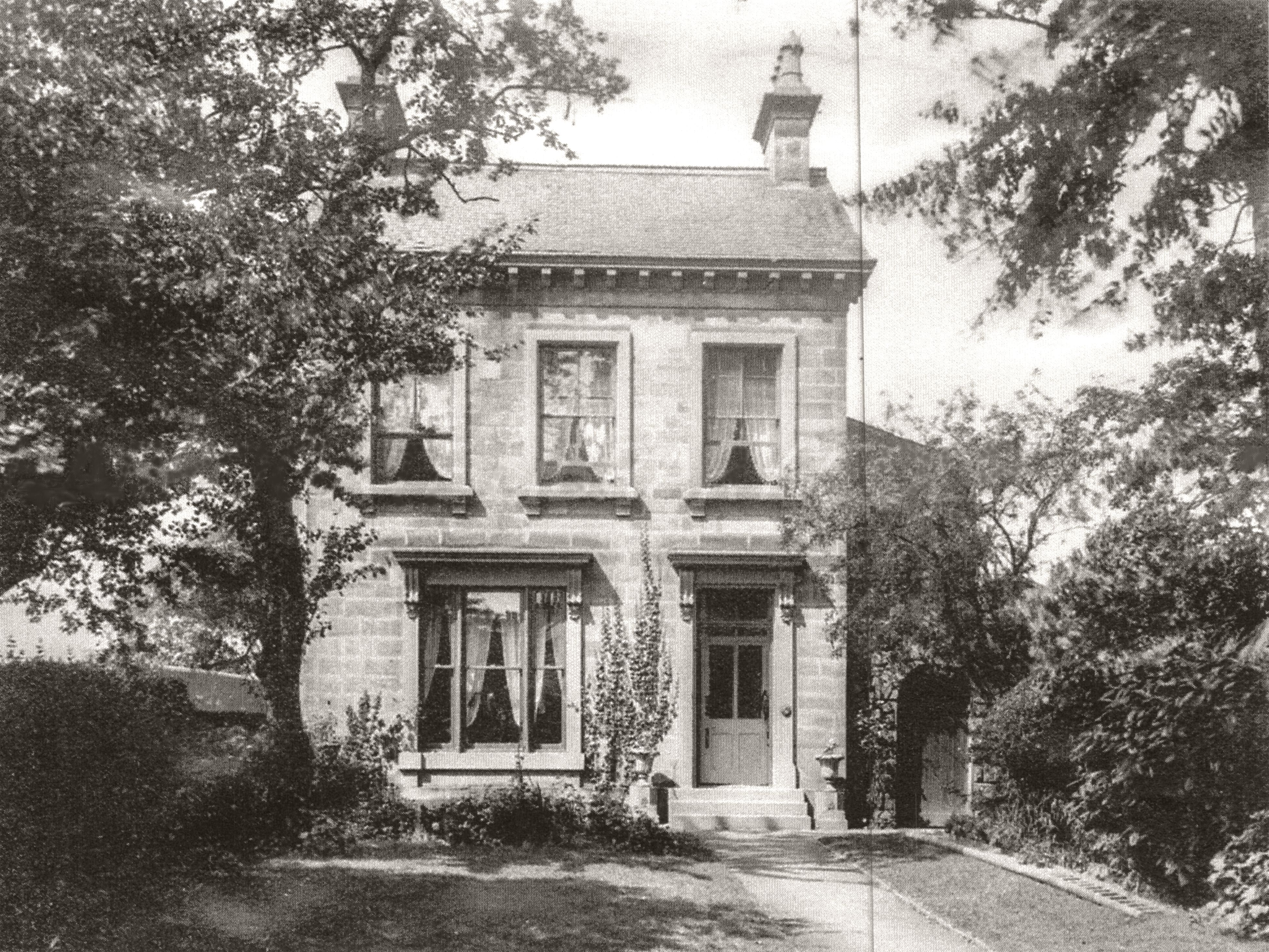
Beech Villa, Turner's Starbeck home

However, Turner's eccentricity was not hidden. Between around 1841 and 1845 he bought Beech Cottage in Starbeck. When his family grew in size he purchased Beech Villa, the half-built house next door, from a builder who became insolvent. Turner, his wife, son and three surviving grandchildren lived there in the High Street, Starbeck, without completing the build, with "a great mound of stones and rubbish remaining in front which on no account would he have disturbed". Turner originally had six grandchildren living with him, but three – Charles Skelton Turner, Arthur Turner and Frederick George Turner – died in childhood. The three surviving grandchildren were borough councillor Walter Alexander Tomas Turner, (Note: Walter Alexander Tomas Turner (c.1869 – 3 July 1912)) Victor Reginald Turner, (Note: Victor Reginald Turner (17 March 1875 – 1 July 1904)) and Albert William Turner. (Note: Albert Willian Turner (9 April 1873 – 11 August 1933) The 1851 and 1861 Censuses find Turner and his wife and son living in Beech Villa, not far from Starbeck railway station, and he is describing himself as a "house and land proprietor". (Note: 1851 England Census, Beech Cottage, Starbeck, HO/107/2283, page 23 (H.M. Government) and 1861 England Census, Scriven with Tentergate (Starbeck), RG/9/3205, page 5, schedule 48 (H.M. Government)) By 1871 Turner was still living in Beech Villa, and describing himself as a retired draper. (Note: 1871 England Census, Beech Villa, Knaresborough Road, Bilton with Harrogate (Starbeck), RG10/4291, page 6 (H.M. Governmetn)) In 1881, the Census finds Turner, aged 81, boarding (not visiting) in a lodging house at 5 Promenade Square, in the parish of St Mary's in Low Harrogate. (Note: 1881 England Census, 5 Promenade Square, St Mary's parish, Low Harrogate (listed as Pannal), RG11/4326, page 2 (H.M. Government)) Meanwhile, his wife Jane was still living in Beech Villa, calling herself a "house and land proprietor's wife". (Note: 1881 England Census, Beech Villa, Starbeck (Harrogate), RG11/4328, page 7, schedule 105 (H.M. Government)) The house was still unfinished when he died. Turner's grandson Alexander Tomas Turner moved into Beech Villa after Jane Turner died in 1887. It was demolished in the 1980s, becoming the site of the present Ravenscourt Buildings. (Note: Beech Villa's address was 29 High Street, Starbeck, now re-numbered as 31. See Google Street View of postcode HG2 7HX.)

== Career ==
=== Bradford ===
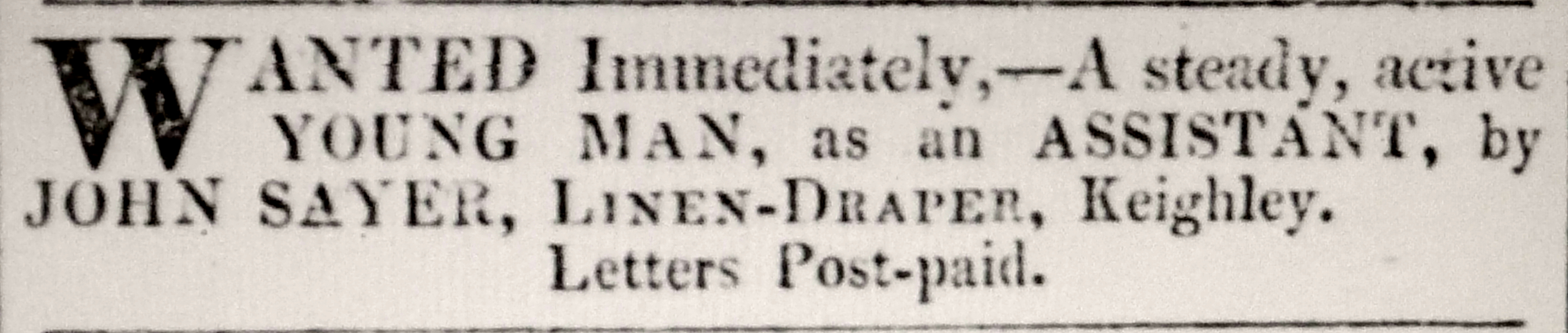
John Sayer's 1827 ad, calling for an assistant

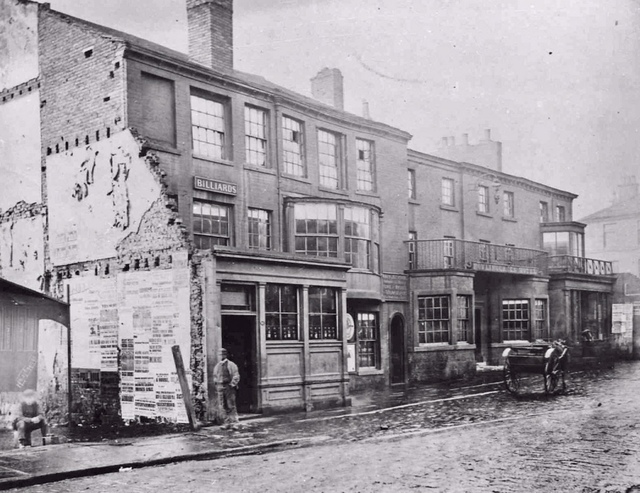
The Bowling Green Hotel, next to which Turner started business

Turner declined farm work, served his draper's apprenticeship at an unknown location, and then in 1827 became a linen draper's assistant at John Sayer's shop, next to the Old Bowling Green Inn, Bradford (since destroyed), and also at Sayer's shop at Keighley. in the West Riding of Yorkshire. While working for Sayer, Turner "was one of the swells of the period, and took great pride in adorning himself with rings, gold guards, (Note: A watch guard was a cover to protect the watch glass of a pocket watch. For examples, see Geoff Alnutt Clocks.) and jewellery, having in this respect higher aspirations than drapers' assistants usually entertain". As historian Stephen Abbott put it, "he bedecked himself in gold jewelley, far more extravagantly than any assistant draper had any right to be".

Sayer found the Bradford shop unprofitable, and he was already trying to let it in 1827, so around 1831 he offered it to Turner, and Turner "thought he could turn the business around". He started on the task with an advance of £1000 (equivalent to £94,921 in 2025) on the security of an expected inheritance from his family – and his appearance and demeanour changed at once. He sold all his jewellery, apart from his watch and gold guard, which he "carefully stored away". "He was never afterward seen to wear a vestige of anything except the most needful apparel". He earned, but did not spend, willingly; "he literally carried his life in his hands in order to achieve success". "In order to drain every last penny out of the business", he and his apprentices worked long hours, opening the shop between four and six in the morning, before his customers were present and well before his neighbours opened their premises, and closing between ten and twelve in the evening when his customers were abed. Passing coachmen who changed horses behind the Bowling Green Inn would sometimes spot Turner still working at one hour past midnight. Turner drove himself hard to keep the shop "packed from basement to attic" with stock, and he would sleep for perhaps a few hours per night among those goods. He trained himself to live with minimum hours of sleep, and he slept in the cellar on the cloth itself. Stephen Abbott concluded that, following his takeover of the draper business, Turner "devoted his whole life to the pursuit of money, even at the expense of his health. He denied himself even the slightest gratification and treated all others likewise".

Turner did not share his fortune with others. He did not marry early in his career. He had a housekeeper as well as a pair of apprentices under contract. This was "a legal agreement to offer the apprentice training in his trade for a set amount of years and for a sum of money". He economised on transport costs by walking everywhere, including those occasions when he had to travel between Bradford and Manchester to purchase stock, the beeline distance being 29 miles (47 km). He "occasionally got a lift in a carrier's wagon, but whether he paid for the ride is doubtful, as parting with money was with him one of the unpardonable sins". All his stock was bought at knock-down prices. He took advantage of independent cottage weavers, too. The Knaresborough Post describes his modus operandi:

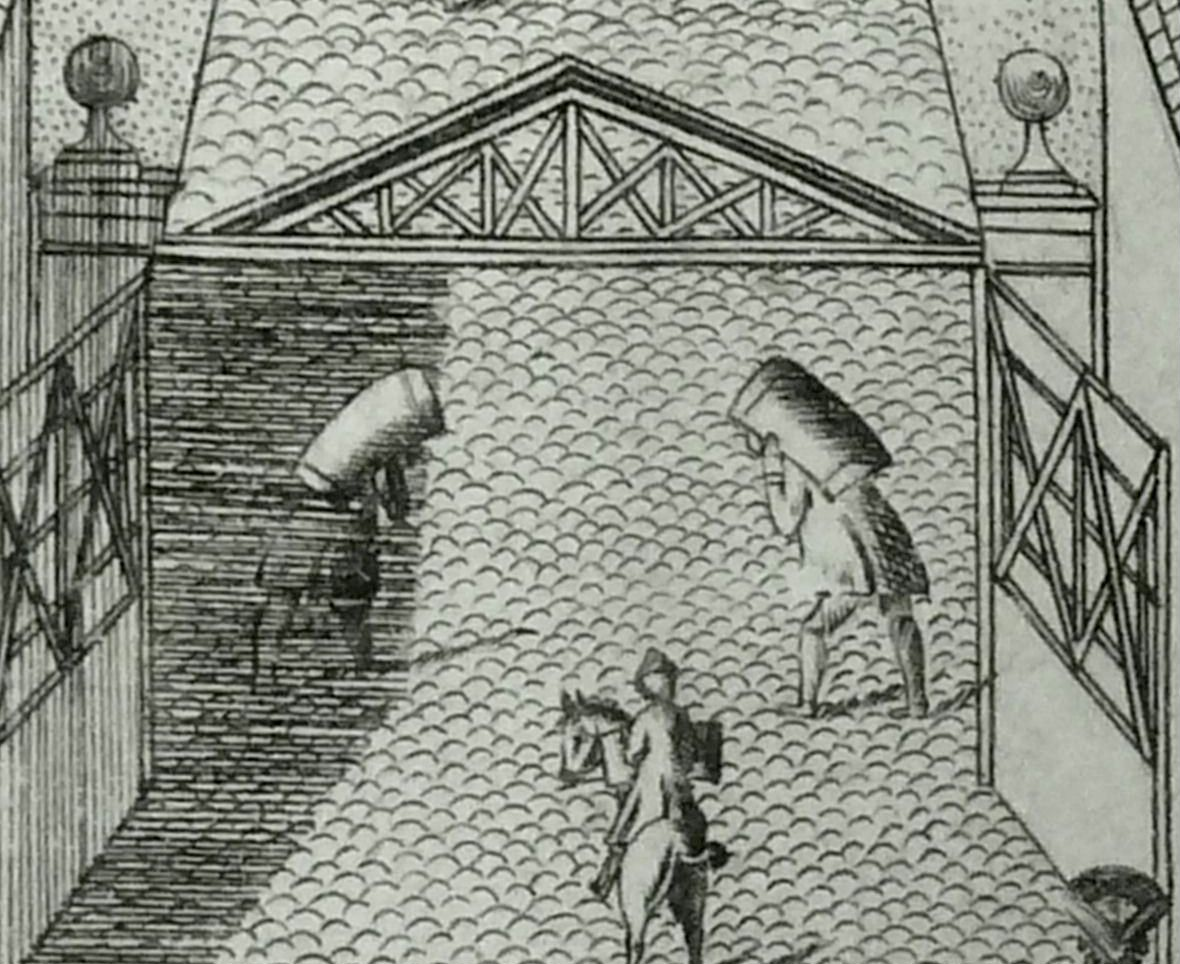
Independent weavers carrying cloth bales. (Mixed Cloth Hall, Leeds, 1758)

In the days when little makers were numerous, and not so well off as perhaps operatives are nowadays, it was the custom for manufacturers to be their own weavers and their own salesmen, travelling the country with the produce of their wooden looms on their backs or on the backs of packhorses or asses. Turner, knowing from experience the chronic impecuniosity of many of these men, waited until they had travelled the country unsuccessfully with their webs, and then, rather than return home empty-handed, they accepted prices from him which meant privation for many days to come.

Turner's draper's shop continued to open for long hours and it did well, but his strenuous workload and self-deprivation made him ill, and in the late 1830s, nine years after starting in business, he sold the shop, which fetched a good price, being known to be a prospering business with a good reputation. With the sale of the shop and his savings, he had accrued £16,000 (equivalent to £1,409,273 in 2025).

=== Starbeck ===
In the late 1830s, for the sake of his health, Turner migrated from industrial Bradford to Beech Cottage, later known as Beech Villa, Castle Villa or Beech Grove House, in Starbeck near the spa town of Harrogate, in the North Riding of Yorkshire. The house was about 100 yards from the North Eastern Railway line. He regained his health and became a moneylender to the people of Harrogate. This was a fortuitous step, because when he arrived, Harrogate consisted of two small villages, but as its fame and size grew and businesses moved in, it filled with rich residents and visitors, and he drew from these as his customer base. As a moneylender, he was "sought after by persons who were in financial embarrassment ... Tradesmen in their winter difficulties, property-owners with deeds to mortgage, sought him without ceasing". Turner was "never known to be entangled in a lawsuit". Historian Stephen Abbott writes, "It was as moneylender that John Turner achieved most local notoriety, benefiting from Harrogate's 1840s building boom". However, The Knaresborough Post says that Turner always charged the same rate of five per cent for loans, he held pledges, and pledges were redeemed. He was now in good health, and secure in his business, but his behaviour continued to draw attention, as it had in Bradford: Stephen Abbout says that Turner was in the habit of putting "anything ... that could possibly realise money" into his bag. The Knaresborough Post somewhat dramatises the story:

Here, secluded in his own house, in the privacy of his own grounds, with re-established health, did the Bradford draper accumulate with greater eagerness than before. Nothing that would realise money escaped his cold grey eyes. Belated travellers and those up betimes encountered him on the highways gathering the refuse of the roads on his wheelbarrow, or picking up stones on the roadside, which, after being broken in sufficient quantities, he would dispose of as road metal. Having on one occasion a debtor at Ripon who was unable to repay him, he took as a security on account a grindstone. Unlimbering it from the frame, he wheeled the stone before him to Starbeck, but unhappily, when within a short distance from his home, it broke in two, and there lay, until he returned with his wheelbarrow for the fragments. The ever present companion of his daily journeys was a dark blue moreen bag, (Note: "Moreen" is "A thick woollen fabric, watered or with embossed figures, used in upholstery, for curtains" (from Wiktionary).) which a friendly lawyer may have discarded, and without which he was rarely seen abroad. No trifle was too inconsiderable to find a home within it; even a stray feather from a fowl by the wayside would be carefully picked up and added to the stock previously gathered. Bits of old iron, stray nails, bags of woollen, cotton, or linen were commodities much too valuable to be left behind. Old boots, shoes and bits of leather were pounced upon and disposed of for what they would realise at the hands of some economical cobbler, or when too valueless for his uses they were hoarded yet a little longer until the whole could be profitably disposed of to the manufacturer of glue.

Turner had tenants in Bradford. He walked from Starbeck with a pre-packed lunch to collect rent, and was once seen walking barefoot across Rombalds Moor, carrying his shoes to "save leather". He was a landlord who never missed the dates when rents were due, and tenants were served a distraint order as soon as they defaulted. Turner did see fit to pay a solicitor, though. In 1875 he paid solicitors Kirby & Son of Harrogate to present a petition for the bankruptcy of the whitesmith, ironmonger and alleged forger William Leek of Harrogate. Leek owed money to Turner, "filed a petition for liquidation of his affairs by arrangement", then absconded, saying he was "going to America". Leek was declared bankrupt on Turner's petition, but as of January 1875 the police were still looking for him.

== Property investment ==
Turner made money out of his savings through "actively searching for investments". His first such venture was made about two years after going into business by buying the deeds of a pub in Kirkgate, Bradford. However, paying the whole purchase price upfront brought public attention to his hidden wealth for the first time, because until that moment he had given the appearance of poverty. It was at that point that his reputation as a miser began. However property values depreciated in the 1880s, depleting the value of his investments.

=== Bilton-with-Harrogate Workhouse ===
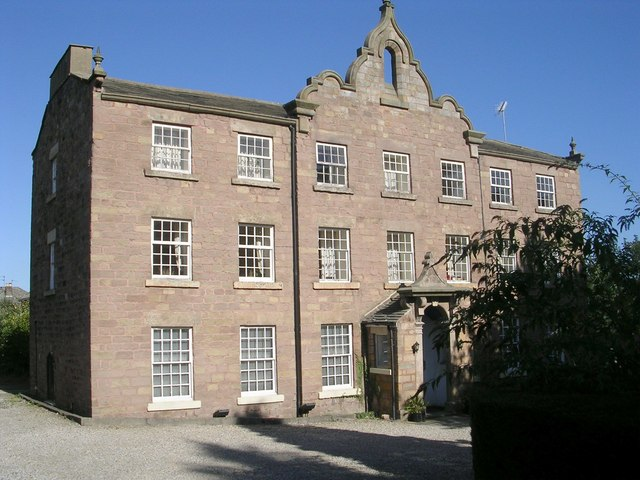
Former Bilton-with-Harrogate Workhouse

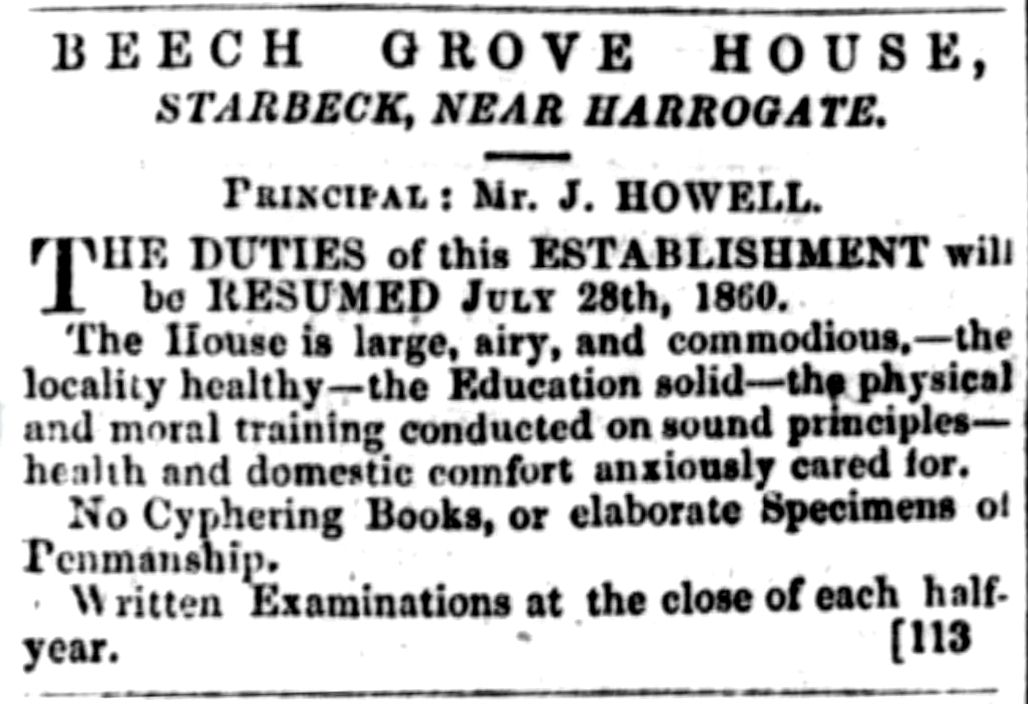
Ad for Beech Grove House, 1860

The Bilton-with-Harrogate Workhouse at 23 High Street, Starbeck, now known locally as Old Starbeck Hall, and formally named Starbeck Hall, is a listed building. It was founded opposite Stonefall Avenue, Starbeck, in 1810, after Harrogate hoteliers refused to have it in their own town. It was opened in 1811 and cost £2,000 (equivalent to £139,669.04 in 2025). It was built for a hundred inmates, and from 1814 it was paying its way with a sufficient number of residents from surrounding areas. By 1841 it contained 71 people. Between 1854 and 1858, it was replaced by a new workhouse in Knaresborough, the inmates were transferred, and in 1858 the building was purchased by Turner. While Turner was landlord, a new front porch was added, and between 1860 and c. 1880 it held Beech Grove Academy, or Beech Grove House, a school catering for children of professional, business and trades parentage. It was a day school with a few boarders, run by the Nonconformist and language teacher Jabez Howell. In his advertisements of 1860 Howell declared a healthy locality and said that, "health and domestic comfort [were] anxiously cared for". In 1879, the school transferred to a new building in East Park Road, Harrogate, was renamed as Victoria Park School, and was purchased by Thomas W. Sayer. By the time Turner died his former workhouse building was being used as a hospice.

== Death ==
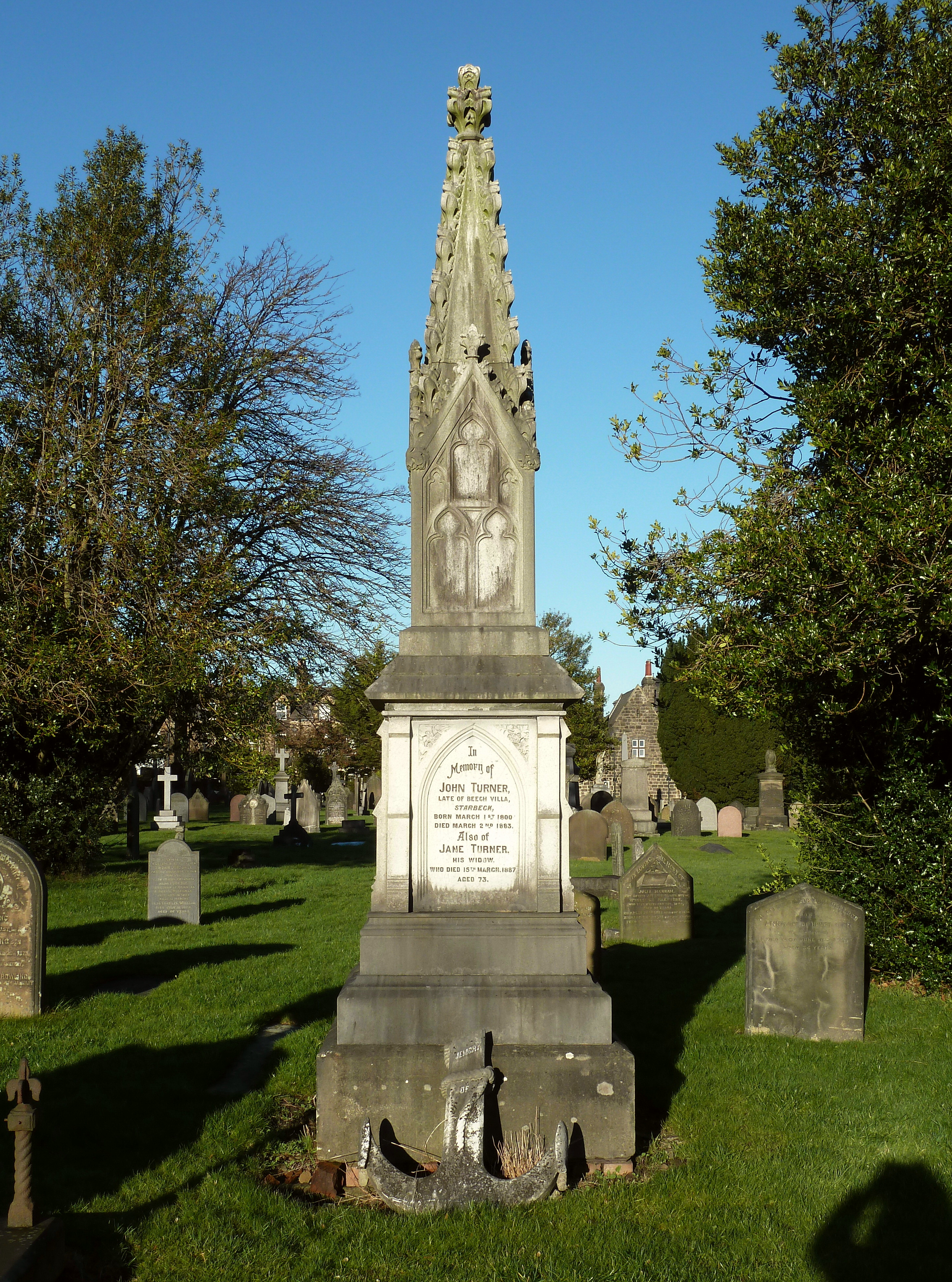
Turner's memorial in the Anglican section of Grove Road Cemetery, Harrogate

By the end of Turner's life, he had become a well-known character in Harrogate and Starbeck, and was a landlord who held a lot of land and property in the vicinity of Harrogate, being described as a "large owner of property" in 1882. He died in Harrogate, "after a long and protracted illness", on 2 March 1883 aged 83 years. (Note: John Turner (1 March 1800 – 2 March 1883). GRO index: Deaths Mar 1883 Turner John 83 Knaresbro' 9a 91. Birth and death dates confirmed by historian Stephen Abbott (see Harrogate Advertiser 2004 source). The death certificate says: 2nd March 1883, Mount Pleasant, Pannal, Urban Sanitary District (USD). Age 83, gentleman. Cause of death: senile decay, certified. Present at the death: (J.?)S. Turner, daughter in law.) Turner's funeral was held on 8 March 1883. At midday, the funeral procession left the Crown Hotel, Harrogate, with seven coaches containing relatives and tenants following the coffin. The funeral service was conducted at Christ Church, High Harrogate, by Reverend C. J. Hamar, after which he was buried at Grove Road Cemetery.

At Turner's death, there was much public speculation on the subject of Turner's worth. His will was proved on 12 April 1883 at the Principal Registry, although a double probate was issued in November 1889. In April 1883 his personal estate was calculated as £50,784, 15s 10d (equivalent to £5,338,887 in 2025). (Note: Probate: Quotes: "John Turner of Starbeck, Harrogate. Former grant: 12 April 1883 at the Principal Registry, personal estate £50,784, 15s 10d (equivalent to £5,441,695 in 2021)". Final probate: "The will with a codicil of John Turner late of Beech Villa or Cottage Starbeck near Harrogate in the county of York gentleman who died 2 March 1883 at Harrogate proved at the Principal Registry by John Ernest Priestley Turner of Merton College in the University of Oxford a student in the said university the other executor.) However, Harrogate historian Stephen Abbott wrote that although Turner's property values had depreciated in the three years prior to his death, he left more than £100,000 (equivalent to £10,512,723 in 2025).

In 1884, as part of a retrospective of the previous year, The Knaresborough Post printed the following obituary of Turner:

[A] figure closely associated with early Harrogate, the late John Turner, of Starbeck. The penurious habits of this individual are well known, and perhaps to some extent he merited the title given him by a Bradford contemporary – miser; but though charity was a quality foreign to his nature, his sense of justice, on the other hand, was so acute, that we believe he was easier satisfied upon the question of per cent, than has been many a man more generally credited with charitable proclivities.

== Aftermath ==
During the forty years after Turner began to earn his fortune, one of his former Bradford apprentices did very well, behaving somewhat unlike his former master Turner. That lad "amassed a handsome fortune in a neighbouring county [and lived] honoured and respected as a public benefactor".

Turner's gravestone, on the Anglican consecrated portion of Grove Road Cemetery, is described by Stephen G. Abbott as, "a large, gothic style family memorial". Soon after Turner died, his biography by a "Bradford contemporary", in which he was titled "Harrogate miser" and compared to Daniel Dancer, was printed in detail in The Bradford Observer, and repeated in two of Robert Ackrill's newspapers, The Knaresborough Post and The Pateley Bridge & Nidderdale Herald. In 2004, Turner was still remembered by The Harrogate Advertiser in Harrogate as a miser under the heading, "The story of a Starbeck miser", with a photograph of his memorial, and in two books by Stephen G. Abbott.

== See also ==
- Margery Jackson
