= Grove Road Cemetery, Harrogate =

Cemetery in North Yorkshire, England

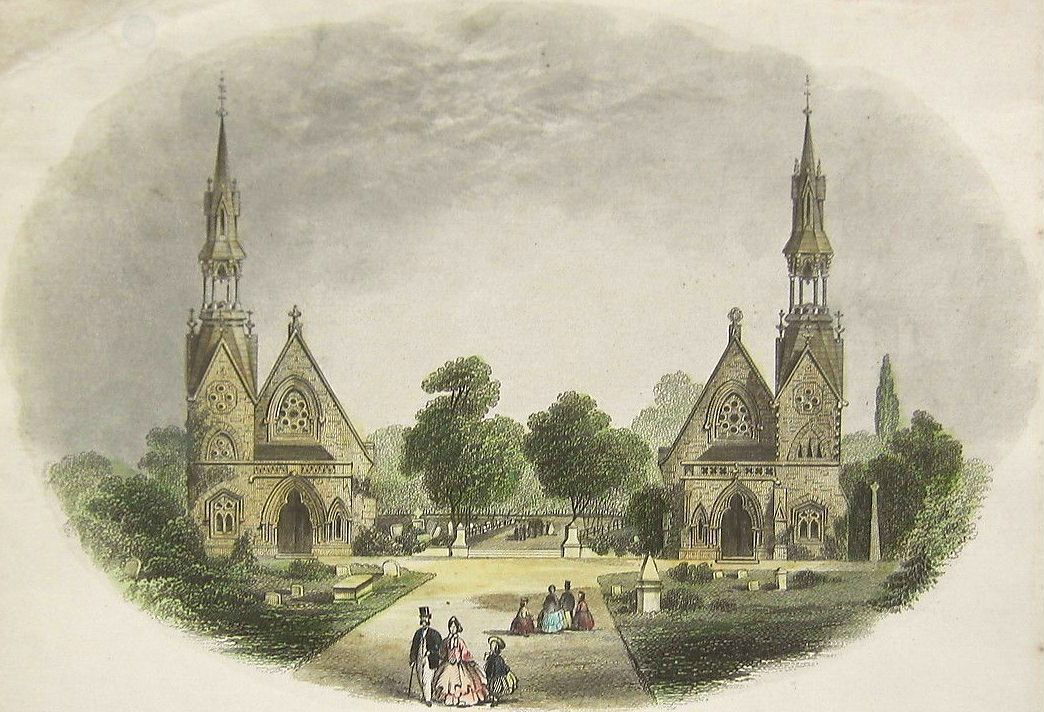
- Grove Road Cemetery chapels, in 1863
- Interactive map of Grove Road Cemetery, Harrogate

Details
- Established: 24 April 1864; 162 years ago
- Location: Grove Road, Harrogate
- Country: England
- Coordinates: 54°00′01″N 01°32′09″W
- Type: Public, Anglican, military graves, memorial
- Owned by: North Yorkshire Council
- Website: Grove Road Cemetery

Grove Road Cemetery, Harrogate, North Yorkshire, England, was formerly known as Harrogate Cemetery. It was established in 1864 after the spa town expanded and the graveyard at Christ Church became full. The cemetery once had a pair of chapels with spires, designed by Thomas Charles Sorby. Although they were admired by local residents who felt it enhanced the town view, they were demolished in 1958. However the lodge and gates, also designed by Sorby, remain.

The cemetery contains more than thirty military graves and memorials of those who died in service, including those who did heroic deeds, those who suffered accidents, and those who died of the 1918 influenza, many of them in their twenties or thirties. They include the grave of Sergeant Major Robert Johnston, who took part in the Charge of the Light Brigade. There is also the "Bilton Boys" monument to eleven soldiers from Bilton and High Harrogate, who died in the First World War. There are various elaborate memorials in the cemetery, dedicated to the town's worthies, such as Robert Ackrill, George Dawson, Richard Ellis and David Simpson, who contributed much to the town, besides gravestones of significant local artists, architects and historians. Also of interest are the gravestones of former slave Thomas Rutling and long-distance kayaker Fridel Dalling-Hay.

Grove Road Cemetery has suffered several issues in the past three decades, such as the death of six-year-old Reuben Powell, who was killed by a falling tombstone while playing there. The incident initiated the felling of thousands of cemetery memorials across England, which continued for several years until the panic ceased and councils were advised to use discretion regarding historical monuments and consideration of the bereaved. There has also been an issue of dog-fouling across the graveyard.

== Early history ==
By 1861, Harrogate was a growing town which needed a second cemetery in addition to the one attached to Christ Church. On 20 June 1861 the Harrogate Improvement Commissioners discussed the matter at the Town Hall, and approved the site between the present Grove Road, and the line of the former North Eastern Railway Company. The 4.5-acre (1.8 ha) site for Harrogate Cemetery (later to be called Grove Road Cemetery) was purchased in 1862. The commissioners specified "two chapels, a lodge [and] a surrounding wall with gates". It was to be laid out as per their instructions, with the western half of the plot reserved for Anglican interments, and the eastern half for non-denominational burials. The competition for the design was announced in August 1862, and Thomas Charles Sorby won a premium of £20 for his design of "delightful little gothic buildings". The total cost by 1863 was £5,000 (equivalent to £543,200 in 2025).

=== Chapels and lodge ===
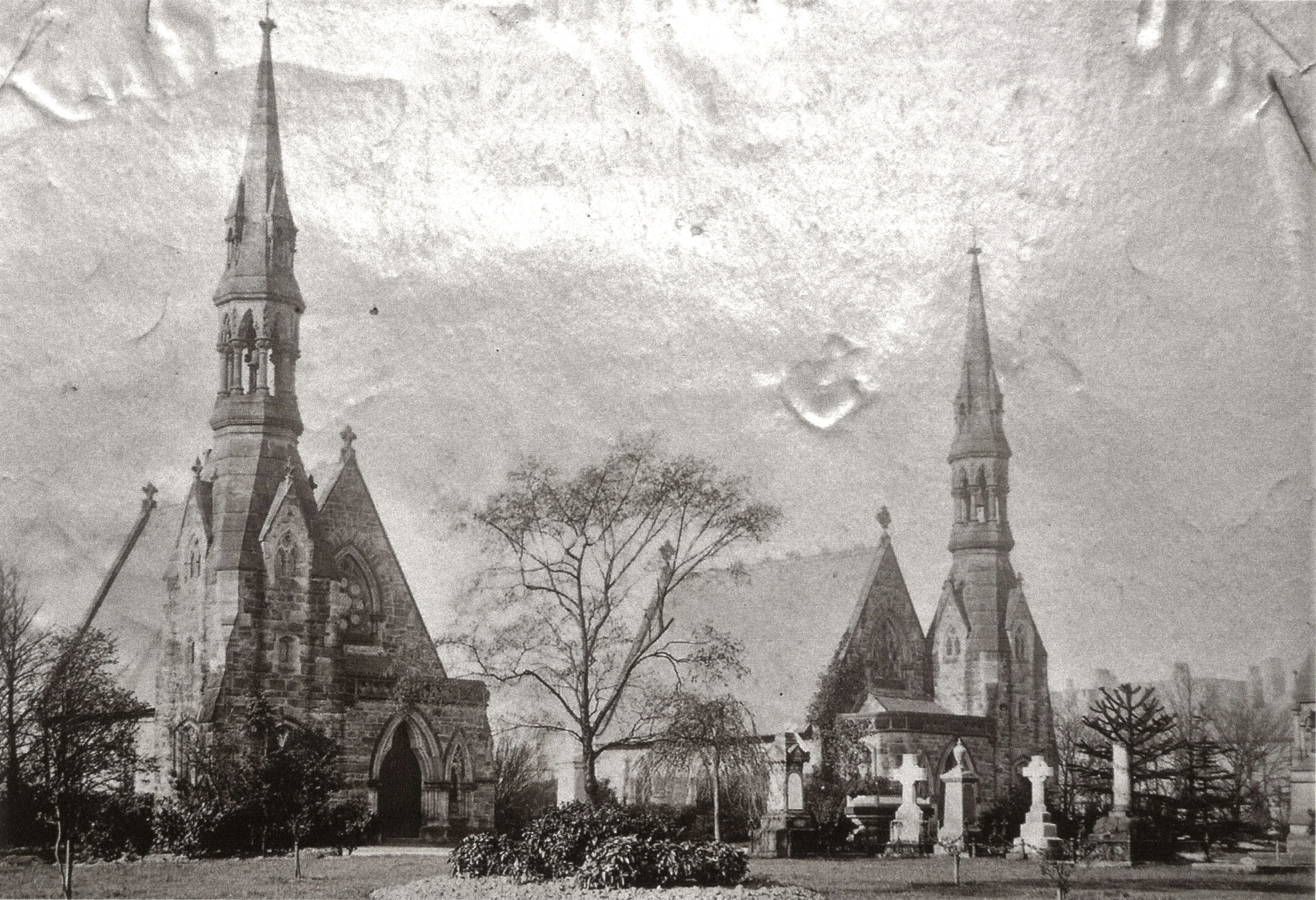
The chapels, before 1926

The cemetery once had two chapels with spires, designed by Thomas Charles Sorby (1836–1924) of London, at a cost of £5,000. The chapel doors faced roughly south towards the main graveyard area, with the cemetery gates on Grove Road behind the two buildings. John Peele Clapham laid the foundation stone for the non-denominational chapel (the right hand one in the picture) on 23 May 1863. One of the ministers who spoke at the ceremony was Rev. John Henry Gavin, the first minister of West Park Congregational Church, Harrogate. Gavin was to be buried there himself at age 38 in 1868. Having processed from the National School to the cemetery with interested parties including eleven clergymen and various Burial Board members, the Bishop of Ripon consecrated the episcopalian half of the cemetery and the Anglican chapel (on the left in the picture) on 23 April 1864. Although the Harrogate Historical Society noted that the chapels formed an "attractive feature in the landscape", they were both demolished in 1958 to create more burial space.

The lodge was sold following a resolution by Harrogate Borough Council in 2016.

== 21st-century events ==
=== Graveyard incident ===
At 7:30 pm on Friday, 7 July 2000, six-year-old Reuben Powell died when playing in Grove Road Cemetery with "many" other children. A 5-foot (1.5 m), hundred-year-old gravestone "fell to the ground, trapping him underneath ... it took three men to lift the slab off Reuben's body". Safety officers said later that, "only a small push or tug would have been needed to dislodge the heavy sandstone slab". There had been previous such incidents in graveyards, but it was this one which had far-reaching consequences.

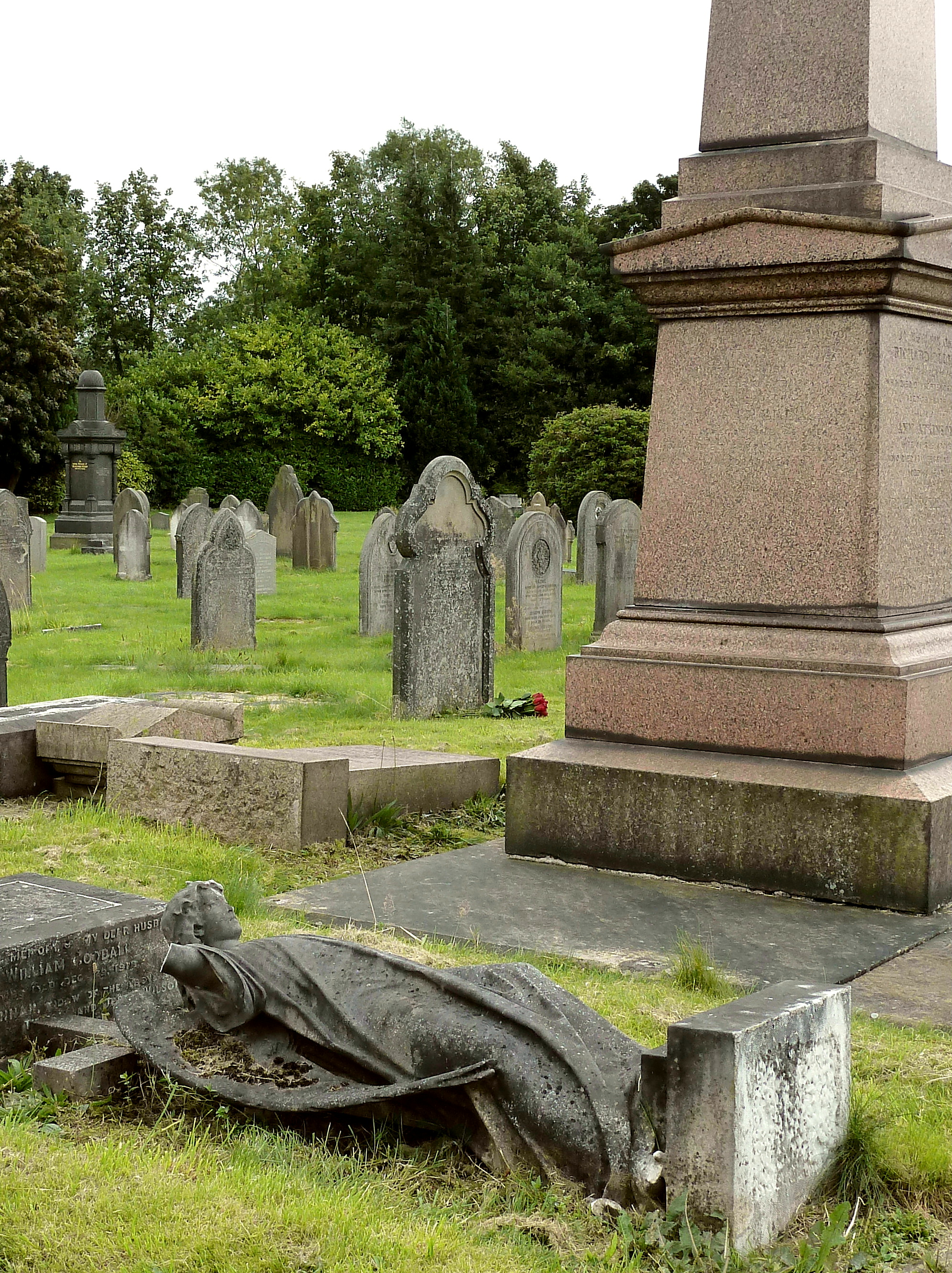
Monuments still lying in Grove Road Cemetery, 2020

Harrogate Council had already carried out a safety survey of Grove Road Cemetery in 1999. This was "part of a memorial safety audit on all ten council-run cemetery sites in Harrogate". In consequence, the council had been "carrying out a programme of improving safety in cemeteries [which] was expected to take several years". Soon after the incident, Councillor Michael Johnston said, "Parents should discourage their children from playing in graveyards". An enquiry into the incident was instigated. The inquest took place on 18 April 2001. The coroner Jeremy Cave ruled that it was an accidental death, and said that he "hoped lessons will be learned". Councils then feared a "legal test case over unsafe gravestones", because the child's parents had said that, "the council had failed to act soon enough to prevent their son's death, and possibly others". Harrogate Council hastened to speed up their five-year safety programme in cemeteries, and it promptly "had 6,000 potentially unsafe slabs placed on the ground".

The incident at Grove Road Cemetery affected many other graveyards, whose gravestones were soon lying flat in response to Coroner Cave's ruling that lessons should be learned. For example, at St Andrew's Church, Aysgarth, Richmondshire, many of its hundreds of gravestones were uprooted and laid down, causing distress to the bereaved of the parish. However its congregation, assisted by the researches of Alastair Dinsdale, argued that the safety problem had been caused by modern limestone mortar or cement which was soon weakened by weathering. They advocated a return to the 19th-century, deep, gravel-filled trench, into which the stone was "battered" in, making it as "solid as a rock". They said the solution was urgent because "If they are left face upwards the water and ice gets into the inscriptions and damages them".

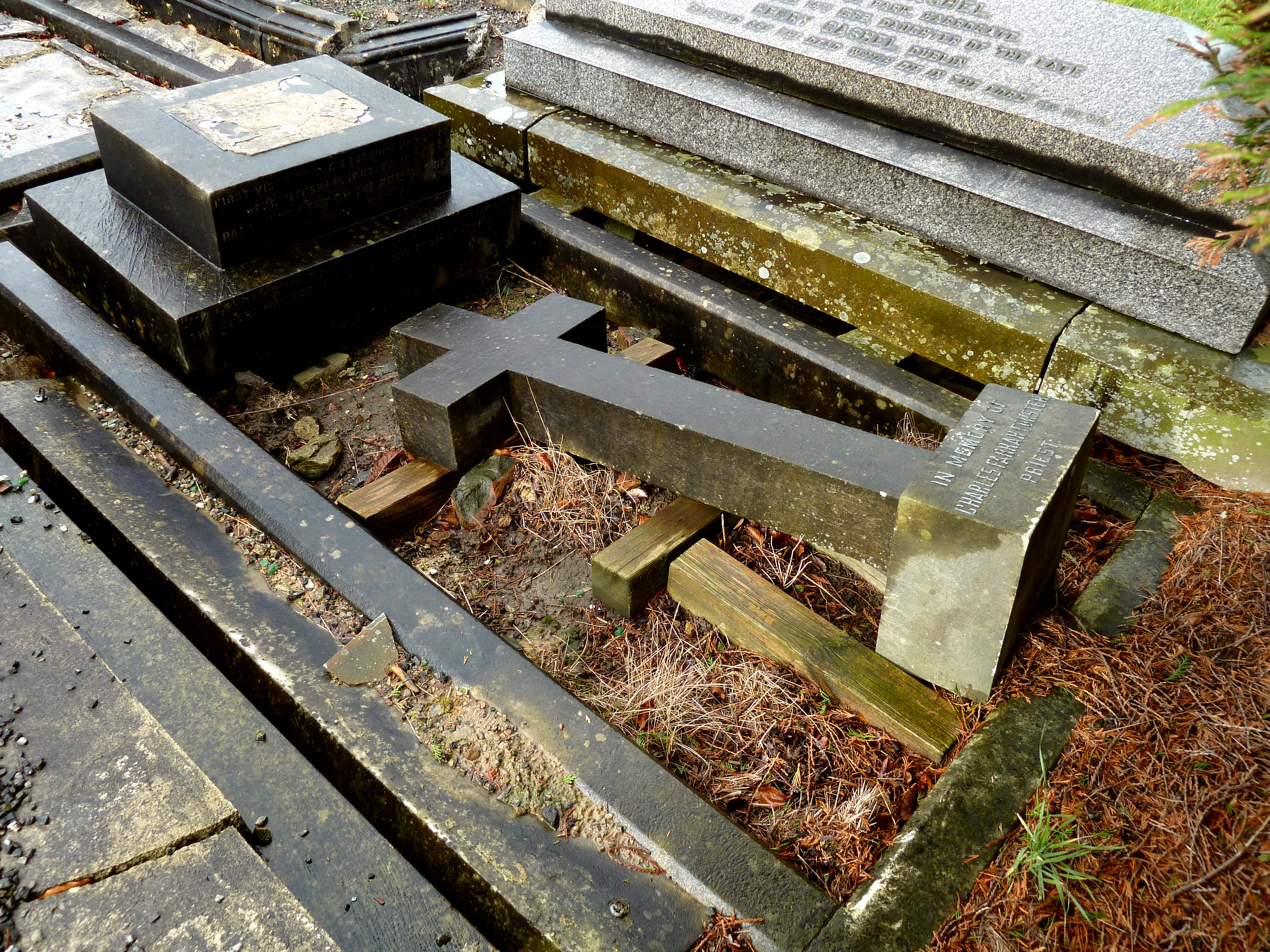
1894 grave of Rev. Charles Farrar Forster, in Harlow Hill Cemetery, 2014

Following the Grove Road Cemetery incident, an improvement notice was served on Harrogate Council, "requiring it to accelerate its memorial testing programme". Seeing this, many councils feared claims of maladministration if they did not lay down their gravestones quickly. A 2010 study by Luke Bennett and Carolyn Gibbeson suggested that some over-zealous councils, possibly spurred on by the insurance industry, had risked damaging historical artefacts and distressing the bereaved, because the monuments were left lying and were not reinstated. On some occasions there had been complaints, by the bereaved and by newspapers, of desecration. By 2010 the panic was subsiding. The Health and Safety Executive (HSE), which had advised the laying down of the stones, revised its position to say that "cemetery owners should have regard to their own industry best practice on the issue", and later revised it again, to say that "the memorial safety risk should be seen in context – and the issue handled with the utmost sensitivity", supporting a consistory court decision in Leicester, 2006. However, as of 2022, many gravestones were still not reinstated. Grove Road Cemetery was tidied by the council in 2021, but it still had some monuments lying down.

=== Dog fouling ===
In February 2022, a mother tending the 1997 grave of her five-year-old daughter in Grove Road Cemetery was distressed to see a dog "defecating over all the graves". The dog had been brought into the cemetery by its owner who let the animal off its lead and sat on a cemetery bench. Although only guide dogs are permitted in the cemetery, and other dogs are banned by Harrogate Council signs, as of 2022 there were "multiple complaints of fouling" on the site by dogs who were let off their leads. Council dog wardens responded:

Please remember this is not an area for walking your dog. It is a graveyard where people will want to pay their respects to their loved ones. Please be considerate of this ... Our aim is to keep the district clear of dog fouling and stray dogs through an effective cleaning regime, encouragement, education and enforcement of responsible dog ownership. We regularly clean up badly fouled public areas and streets and maintain more than 250 dog waste bins and 1,000 litter bins.

=== Bilton Boys War Memorial ===
In 2018, the "Bilton Boys" monument to eleven soldiers of Bilton and High Harrogate, who were killed during the First World War, was discovered by councillor Paul Haslam in the undergrowth of Grove Road Cemetery. It had originally stood in the grounds of the former Methodist chapel in Grove Road, and had been relocated across the road to the cemetery when the chapel was converted into flats. The white marble monument was in a degraded and dismantled condition, lying "almost forgotten" on a pallet, with its bronze soldier figure missing. Following a campaign by Haslam, the monument was restored at an estimated cost of £25,000, and reinstated inside the cemetery. Its bronze soldier was replaced with a cap. Wreaths were laid on the monument on Remembrance Day, 2021. The names recorded on the monument are: Fred W.C. Horner, Reginald Jones, Charles V. Bell, John W. Fishburn, Percie Balme, Willie Hutchinson, Herbert Gibson, Geoffrey G. Hewson, Henry M. Partridge, C.A. Arrowsmith, and Reginald Burnett.

== Individual military memorials ==
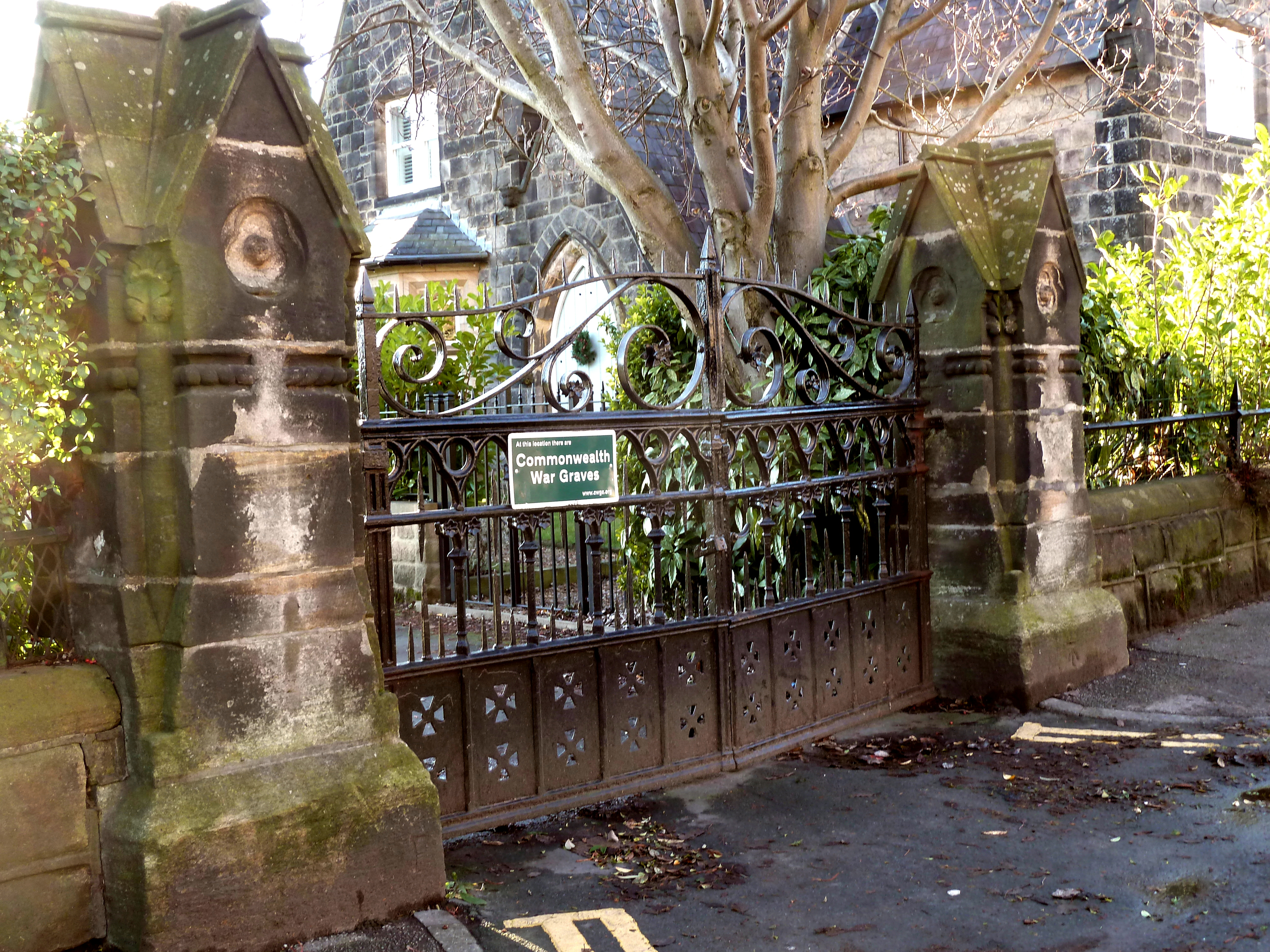
Gateway designed by Sorby, with Commonwealth War Graves sign

Grove Road Cemetery contains 37 identified casualties from the First and Second World Wars, including at least 32 Commonwealth war graves relating to the First World War, and four from the Second World War, plus other military graves and memorials.

=== Gustaaf Adolphe Bekaert ===
Soldaat 1 kl Gustaaf Adolphe Bekaert (25 September 1880 – 4 March 1915), of the 6th Belgian Light Infantry, or Belgian Land Component, (Note: Soldaat 1 kl G.A. Bekaert is buried in plot K. border 273 of Grove Road Cemetery. GRO Index: Deaths Mar 1915 Bekaert Gustave A. 34 Knaresbro 9a 168) a master linen weaver of Ghent in civil life, is buried in Grove Road Cemetery. He was "struck in the neck and lungs by shrapnel" while defending a fort at Antwerp. He was taken to hospital at Ostend, then transferred to Harrogate Hospitals, where his cousin was one of his fellow refugees. His decease at Beaulieu Hospital was the first death of a wounded soldier at the Harrogate Military Hospitals. His funeral included a two-and-a-half-hour mass at St Robert's Church, Harrogate, and was the second military funeral of the war, to take place in Harrogate. His wife and child had been left behind in Ghent. His funeral was attended by "many of the Belgian refugees, as well as many of the Belgian soldiers in the town".

The cortege was preceded by a number of Belgian soldiers from hospitals in the town, at the head of whom floated the Belgian flag, surmounted by a pennon of black crêpe. About a 100 Belgian refugees, mostly wearing black armlets crossed by the Belgian national colours, took part in the procession. The Mayor of Harrogate was among those who followed ... The procession from (St Robert's Catholic Church) to the cemetery was headed by the Yorkshire Hussars band playing the Dead March in Saul. Volleys were fired over the grave by a detachment of the Yorkshire Hussars, and the buglers gave The Last Post.

=== Lieutenant Donald Simpson Bell ===
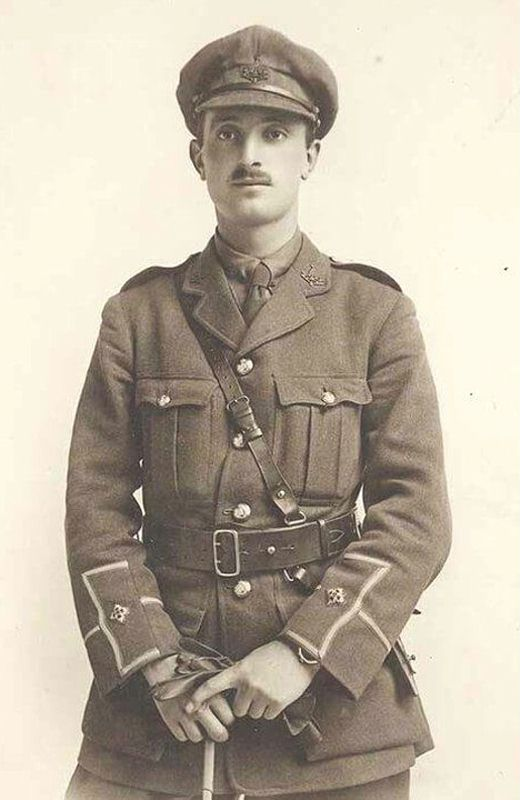
Lieut. D.S. Bell

In 2016, a privately owned memorial stone dedicated to First World War casualty Lieutenant Donald Simpson Bell VC (1890–1916), of the Yorkshire Regiment, was discovered in a dilapidated state, in Grove Road Cemetery, by William Thompson. Bell was a Harrogate-born teacher, and a professional footballer for Bradford Park Avenue, who won the VC by taking out a machine gun position and killing its operators. He is buried at Gordon Dump Cemetery. (Note: There is further information about Lieutenant Bell here: File:Donald Simpson - Bell Charles Hull - Robert Grant - geograph-4994558-by-Alf-Beard.jpg)

=== 4th Officer Alfred Morris Briglin ===
Fourth Officer Alfred Morris Briglin, of the Merchant Navy, served on the PSS Franz Ferdinand, (Note: PS Franz Ferdinand was possibly the war-requisitioned Unterach (ex-Franz Ferdinand, ex-Attersee) (1870–1978). See Paddlesteamers Info.) and died of disease at Simla on 25 July 1916, aged 46 years. He is listed on the Basra Memorial.

=== Private Alfred Bruce ===
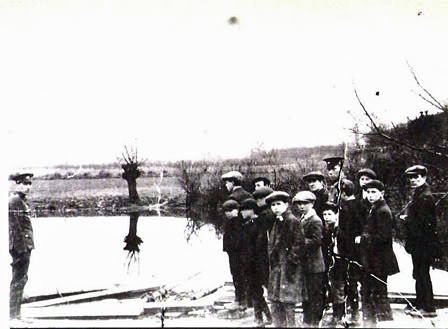
The gyme in the River Trent where seven men drowned

Private Alfred Bruce (c. 1893 – 19 February 1915) of the King's Own Yorkshire Light Infantry drowned aged 21 years in Lincolnshire. (Note: Private A. Bruce is buried in plot West Border.687 of Grove Road Cemetery. GRO index: Deaths Mar 1915 Bruce Alfred 21 Gainsbro 7a 1120) He was one of seven soldiers who died in the gyme, (Note: Gyme or gime is an archaic Yorkshire term for a break in a river embankment) at Morton near Gainsborough, while under training to construct pontoons next to deep water in the River Trent. Although coroner Gamble's verdict at the inquest was "accidentally drowned", Gamble said he "was astounded that the work should be carried out at such a dangerous place". The jury regretted that "Captain Hirst and the men under him were inexperienced in raft-building, that the area of the raft was insufficient for the number of men carried, and that the provision for life-saving was inadequate", although they commended the efforts of those who tried to save them.

Bruce had been a promising student, an amateur footballer, a member of two choirs, and a soldier. The funeral took place with military honours on 23 February 1915. "A vast crowd of sympathetic people assembled along King's Road to St Luke's Church", where a "special service" took place. "The firing party from the Yorkshire Hussars lined up in front of the north entrance to the church, and as the cortège drew up presented arms. The coffin was enveloped in the Union Jack and surmounted by a number of choice wreaths". The Harrogate Herald described Bruce's last journey:

On leaving the church the clergy and surpliced choir headed the procession to the cemetery, which also included a detachment of the 11th Batt. K.O.Y.L.I. stationed at Harrogate, comprising Lieutenant Swann, a sergeant, corporal, and 20 men, the firing party from the Yorkshire Hussars with reversed arms, buglers from the 11th Batt. K.O.Y.L.I., and a bearer party from the deceased's regiment, the 4th Battalion K.O.Y.L.I. The paths along both sides of Grove Road to the cemetery gates were crowded with people, and a large number gathered in the cemetery. [After the graveside service] the firing party then shot three rounds over the open grave, and the Last Post was sounded by the buglers.

=== 3rd Class Walter Ernest Cartman ===
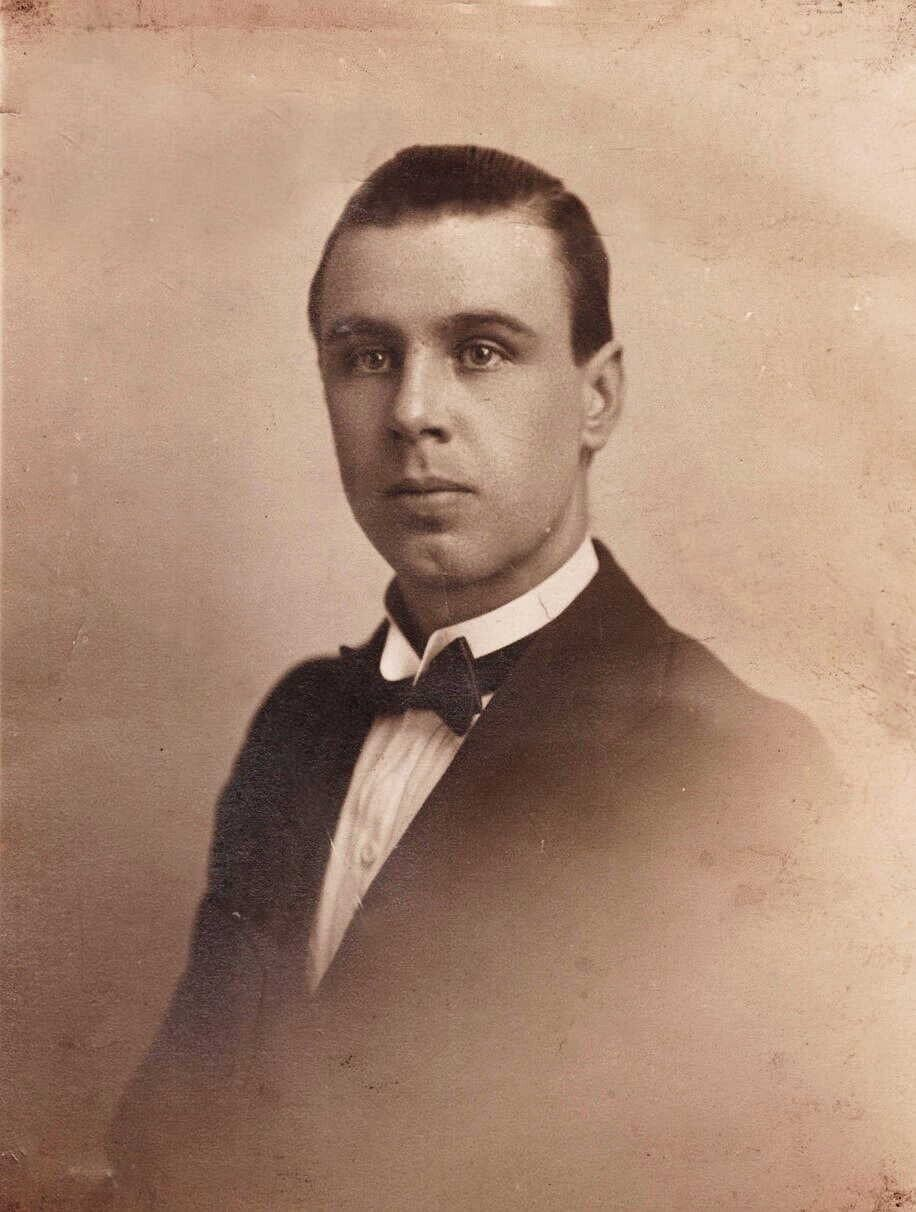
Air Mech. W.E. Cartman

Air Mechanic 3rd Class Walter Ernest Cartman (31 July 1889 – 26 October 1918) of the Royal Air Force was from Harrogate, and had been an assistant music hall manager before his military career. Sources suggest that he was killed in action, or died of influenza, in the First World War, aged 29. (Note: Air Mechanic W.E. Cartman is buried in plot H.342 of Grove Road Cemetery. Note: Another source says that he died of influenza at The Connaught Military Hospital in Aldershot on 26 October 1918, his body sent home to Harrogate for burial.)

=== Private Arthur Halliday ===
Private Arthur Halliday (c. 1890 – 2 December 1917), of the Canadian Expeditionary Force, (Note: Private A. Halliday is buried in plot H.926 of Grove Road Cemetery. GRO Index: Deaths Dec 1917 Halliday Arthur 27 Elham 2a 1365) had been a Saskatchewan barber in civil life. He died aged 27 years in No.11 Canadian General Hospital, Moore Barracks, Shorncliffe, Kent. He had been sent home from the front after receiving a "gunshot wound in the back". He recovered physically, but was transferred from the Bromley Convalescent Hospital with "a neurasthetic condition, and required observation as to his nervous condition". During World War I, being "shot in the back" was a synonym for cowardice (which today might be understood to be PTSD), and Halliday "begged very hard not to be sent home" to Canada. At the Canadian General Hospital he made several attempts at suicide, first with poison, and then by taking a razor from a fellow patient and cutting his own throat. The inquest returned a verdict of "suicide whilst temporarily insane".

=== Private Albert Ernest Hart ===
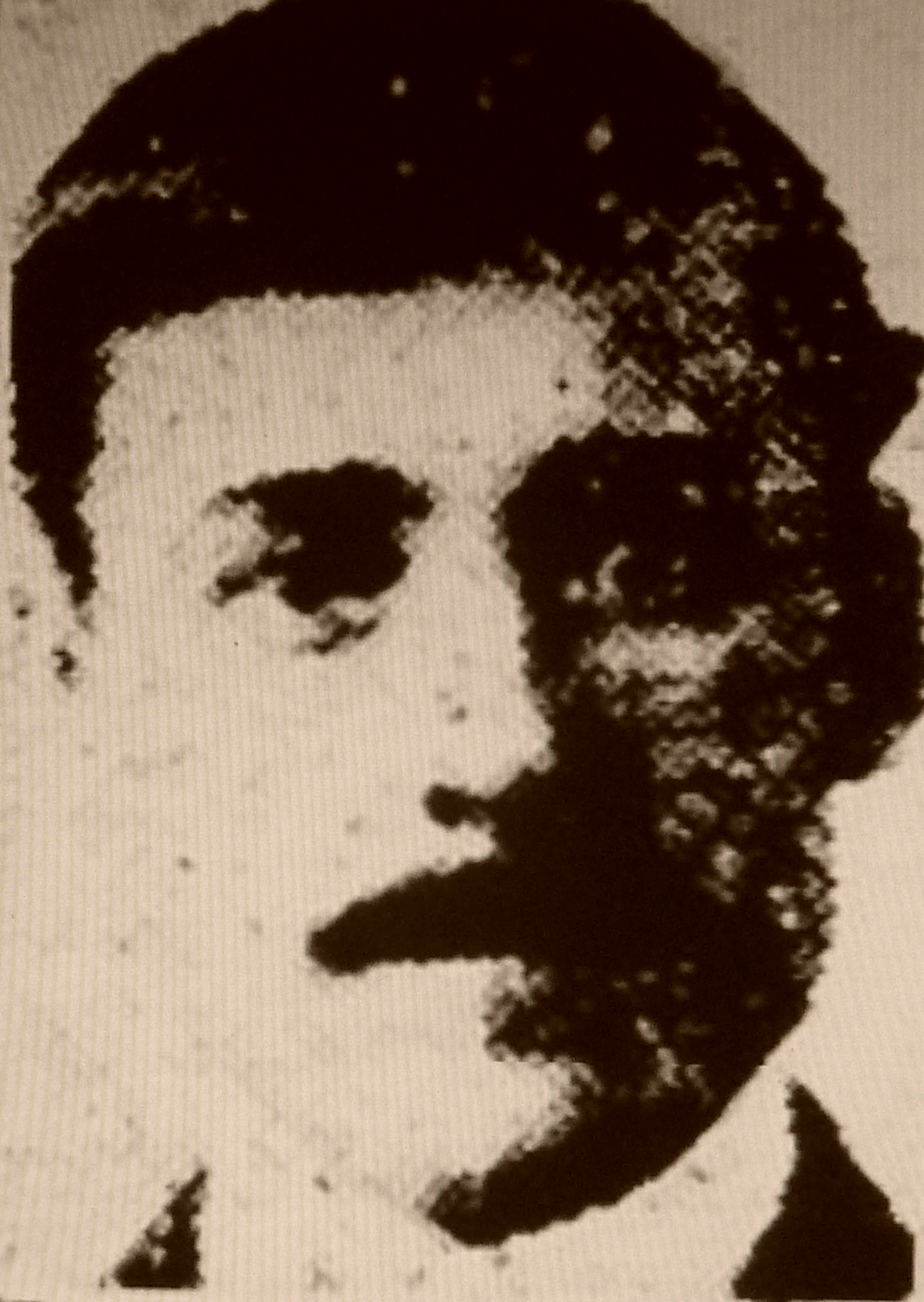
Pte A.E. Hart

Private Albert Ernest Hart (1880 – 5 May 1917) of the Army Service Corps (ASC), (Note: Private A.E. Hart is buried in plot H.344 of Grove Road Cemetery.) worked for Harrogate Gas Company and was a member of the Harrogate Temperance Band for twenty years. He joined the ASC in January 1917, and in May he was still in training in the south of England. He died aged 37 years at Leeds railway station on his way home to Mayfield Terrace, Harrogate, on leave. The inquest found that he had died of coma-pneumonia and pleurisy, with a judgement of natural causes. He left a widow and children who had no other support.

=== Captain Henry Hall Jackson ===
The career military man, and Harrogate-born, Captain Henry Hall Jackson MC (28 October 1890 – 28 November 1918), of the 15th The King's Hussars, and later of the RAF, is buried in Grove Road Cemetery. (Note: Captain Henry Hall Jackson is buried in plot C.279 of Grove Road Cemetery. GRO Index: Deaths Dec 1918 Jackson Harry H. 28 Knaresbro 9a 211) He is also listed on the memorial at Charterhouse School, Godalming.

=== Sergeant Major Robert Johnston ===
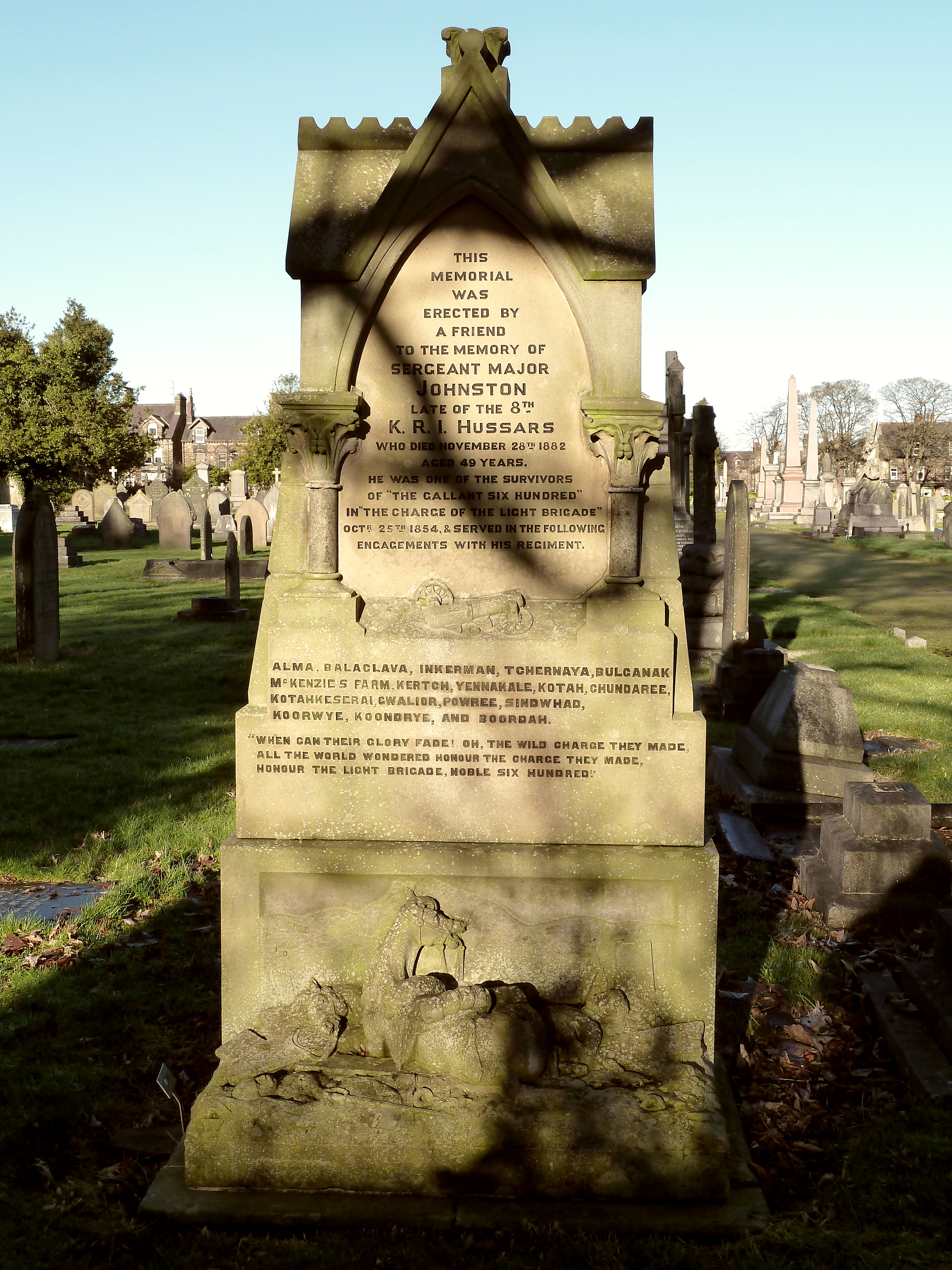
Grave of Robert Johnston

Sergeant Major Robert Johnston (1833 – 28 November 1882), (Note: GRO Index: Deaths Dec 1882 Johnston Robert 48 Knaresbro' 9a 79. Sergeant Major Robert Johnston is buried in plot E1058 of Grove Road Cemetery.) a "Balaclava hero" of the 8th KRI Hussars, was born in Dublin and took part in the Charge of the Light Brigade. After serving in the military for nearly 23 years, and receiving the Crimea Medal, Johnston retired to the Cottage Hospital in the spa town of Harrogate to improve his health. Although the population of Harrogate was about 12,000 at the time, Johnston's funeral was attended by around 20,000 people. He was buried in Grove Road Cemetery with full military honours. His 2.5-ton monument, sculpted in Bolton Wood stone by Thomas Potts of Harrogate and funded by subscription, was erected in Grove Road Cemetery in December 1885. The monument was described by the Harrogate Advertiser as follows:

At the base of the stone is an elaborate carving of the famous War picture after Landseer, and the manner in which this particular part of the work has been done reflects the greatest credit upon the sculptor, who has spared neither labour nor pains to give the tombstone an imposing and attractive appearance. It is surmounted by a Maltese cross, and stands nearly eight feet in height. The top is worked in "broken ornament" pattern, and the stone is further beautified by small green granite pillars, placed on each side of the description, which reads as follows: This monument was erected by voluntary subscriptions to the memory of Sergeant Major Johnston, late of the 8th KRI Hussars, who died November 28th, 1882, aged 49 years. He was one of the survivors of 'The gallant Six Hundred', in 'The Charge of the Light Brigade', October 25th, 1854, and served in the following engagements with his regiment: Alma, Balaclava, Inkerman, Tchernaya, Bulganak, McKenzie's Farm, Kertch, Tennakale, Kotah, Chundares, Kotahkeserai, Gwalior, Powree, Sindwhad, Koorwye, Koondrye, and Boordah. (Note: For the abovementioned engraving, War, after Landseer, see File:War - engraving by Stocks after Landseer.jpg.)

=== John William Kirkbride ===
Private John William Kirkbride (c. 1893 – 10 April 1916) of the West Yorkshire Regiment (Prince of Wales's Own). (Note: Private J.W. Kirkbride is buried in plot E.2286 of Grove Road Cemetery.) Kirkbride, a native of Starbeck, Harrogate, was wounded "in the fighting for the international trench in France". He died, aged 23 years, in the Birmingham No.1 Hospital, Rubery Hill.

=== Lance Corporal John Hector Neil Macmillan ===
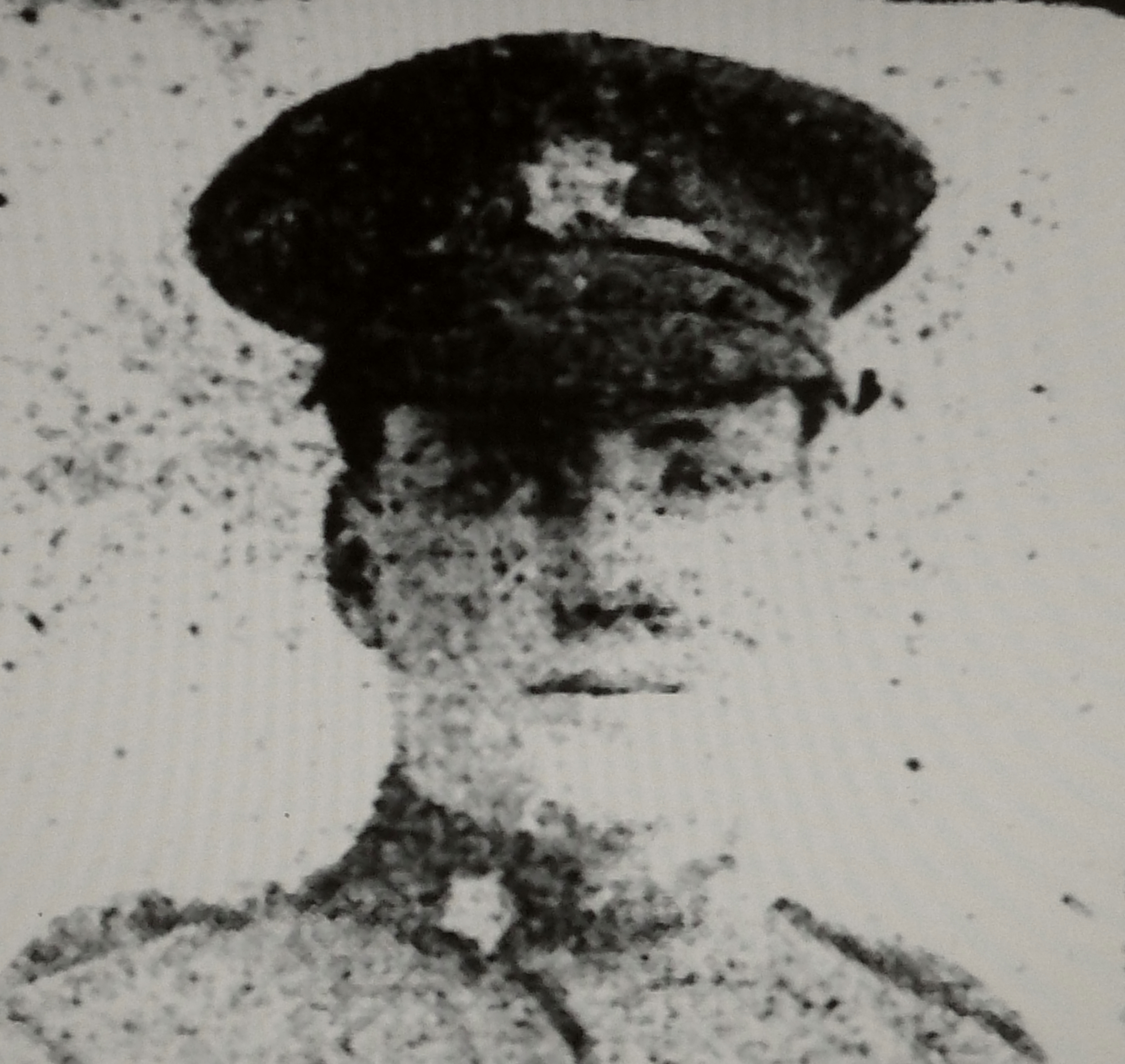
L. Cpl J.H.N. Macmillan

Lance Corporal John Hector Neil Macmillan (29 December 1891 – 12 November 1915), of the Canadian Expeditionary Force, (Note: Lance Corporal J H N Macmillan is buried in plot H.907 of Grove Road Cemetery. GRO Index: Deaths Dec 1915 McMillan John H.M. 23 Billesdon 7a 26) is buried in Grove Road Cemetery. He was a hairdresser and choral singer, and a native of Harrogate. He emigrated to Canada, joined the Canadian infantry, and was shot in the head in the trenches in France. He was brought to England, where he died. He was buried with military honours, with a troop of the Yorkshire Hussars joining the cortège, and two buglers playing the Last Post over the grave. Besides friends and relatives at the funeral were "a large number of members of the congregation of Harrogate Presbyterian Church" and the St Paul's Church Choir.

=== Sergeant Major Fred Rayner ===
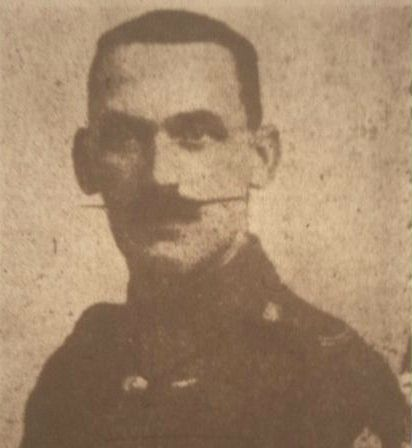
Sgt Maj. Fred Rayner

Sergeant Major Fred Rayner DCM (1880 – 1 May 1918) of the West Yorkshire Regiment won the DCM in January 1917 for "digging men out of demolished trenches under shell fire". He was wounded in France or Belgium during the First World War, and died of his wounds in England, aged 38. He was buried at Grove Road Cemetery with full military honours. He was a clerk from Leeds and Harrogate who served in the army for 22 years, in the South African War and as a Territorial Army instructor. (Note: Sgt Maj F. Rayner is buried in plot K.19 of Grove Road Cemetery)

=== Willie Rowling ===
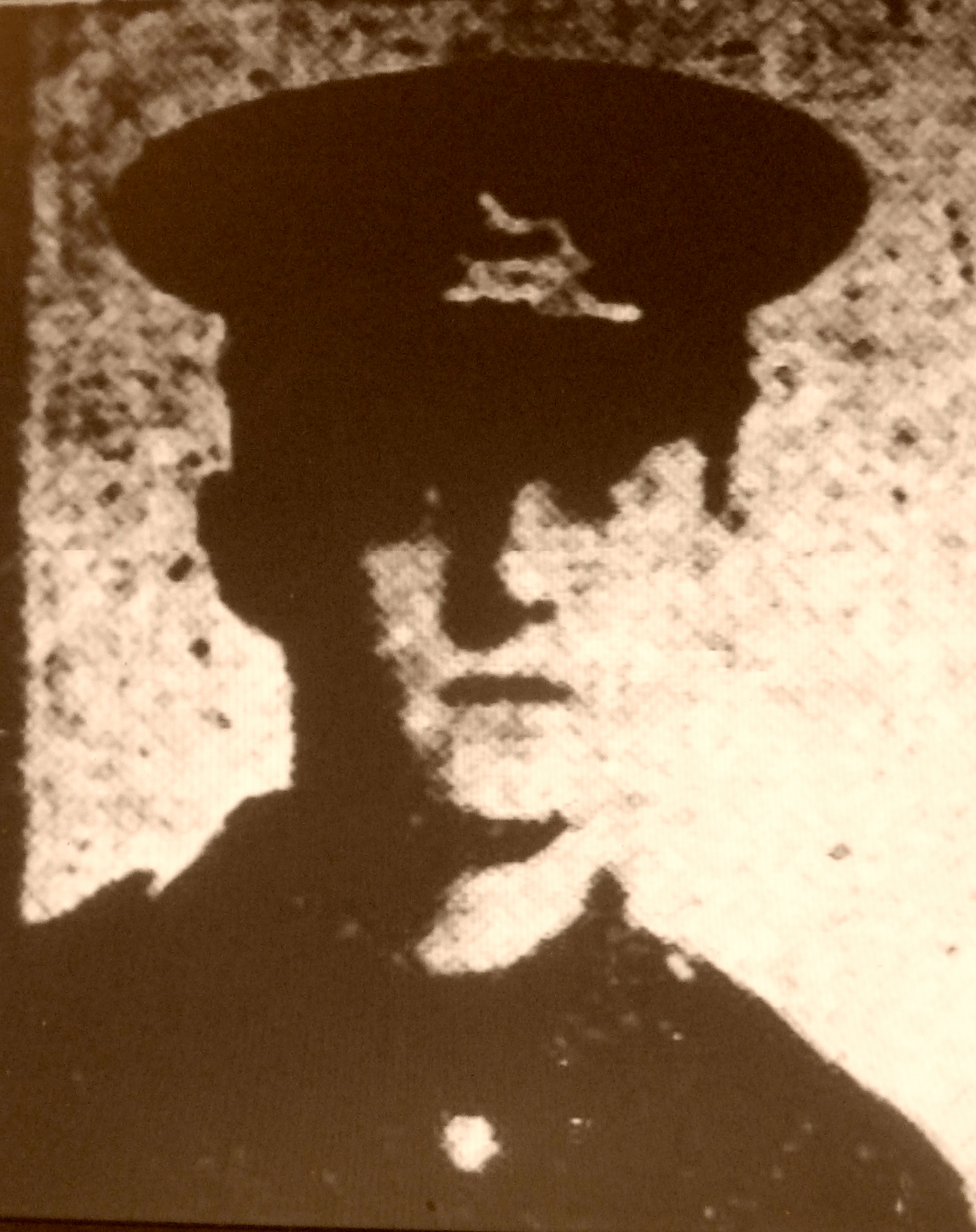
Pte J.W. Rowling

Private James W. "Willie" Rowling (c. 1887 – 11 December 1918), of the West Yorkshire Regiment (Prince of Wales's Own), (Note: Private J.W. Rowling is buried in plot C.1604 of Grove Road Cemetery. GRO Index: Deaths Dec 1918 Rowling James W. 31 Knaresbro 9a 176) was "hit on the head by a piece of heavy German shell" in May 1917, but survived the wound. Rowling died at 1 Montpellier Gardens, Harrogate, aged 31, of pneumonia, after catching influenza.

=== John Stott ===
Shoeing Smith John Stott (c. 1887 – 12 June 1917), of the Army Service Corps (ASC), (Note: Shoeing Smith J. Stott is buried in plot D.965 of Grove Road Cemetery.) lived at 38 Birch Grove, Harrogate, and had a wife and four children. He was a farrier, and served two years on the staff of the ASC in London. He was then kicked by a horse before being diagnosed with tuberculosis, and died in hospital.

=== Other military memorials ===
Besides those described in more detail above, others memorialised here who died in service in the First World War are:

- Private George Allinson (1884 – 30 November 1918) of the RASC, (Note: Private G. Allinson is buried in plot I.332 of Grove Road Cemetery.)
- Lance Corporal Alfred G. Amos (1879 – 30 January 1917) of the Highland Light Infantry. (Note: Lance Corporal A.G. Amos is buried in plot C.869 of Grove Road Cemetery)
- Sergeant Frederick Henry Botterill (1867 – 5 January 1920) of the Durham Light Infantry. (Note: Sergeant F.H. Botterill is buried in plot E.1158 of Grove Road Cemetery. GRO index: Births Dec 1867 Botterill Frederick Henry Knaresbro' 9a 98)
- Drummer Reginald Burnett (4 March 1897 – 22 March 1919) of the West Yorkshire Regiment (Prince of Wales's Own). (Note: Drummer Reginald Burnett is buried in plot F.1256 of Grove Road Cemetery. GRO Index: Deaths Mar 1919 Burnett Reginald 22 Knaresbro 9a 206)
- Rifleman Fred Coates (c.1887 – 5 October 1917) of the King's Royal Rifle Corps. (Note: Rifleman F Coates is buried in plot K.99 of Grove Road Cemetery. GRO Index: Deaths Dec 1917 Coates Frederick W. 30 Knaresbro 9a 118)
- Petty Officer 1st Class Alfred Cooke (29 June 1874 – 25 April 1918), of the Royal Navy, H.M Minesweeper St Seiriol. (Note: Petty Officer 1st Class A. Cooke is buried in plot H.376 of Grove Road Cemetery.)
- Private Harold Elliott (1893 – 24 May 1918) of the West Yorkshire Regiment (Prince of Wales's Own). (Note: Private Harold Elliott is buried in plot I.236 of Grove Road Cemetery. GRO Index: Deaths Jun 1918 Elliott Harold 25 Knaresbro 9a 145)
- Captain John Edward Joseph Farrell (c.1861 – 19 November 1917) of the Cheshire Regiment. (Note: Captain J.E.J. Farrell is buried in plot K.7 of Grove Road Cemetery. GRO Index: Deaths Dec 1917 Farrell John E.J. 56 Knaresbro 9a 127) Farrell was a native of Moynalty Ireland. He died in Harrogate following an illness.
- Private William Firth (1891 – 10 April 1919) of the Royal Scots. (Note: Private W. Firth is buried in plot C.866 of Grove Road Cemetery.)
- Second Lieutenant George Hainsworth RAF, RFC (3 July 1899 – 4 December 1918) of the Royal Air Force, (R.N. College, Greenwich), (Note: Second Lieutenant George Hainsworth is buried in plot C.877 of Grove Road Cemetery. Deaths Dec 1918 Hainsworth George 19 St.Geo.H.Sq 1a 1073) died of influenza.
- Private Harry Hainsworth (c.1890 – 29 November 1918) of the Royal Army Ordnance Corps. (Note: Private H. Hainsworth is buried in plot C.877 of Grove Road Cemetery. Gro Index: Deaths Dec 1918 Hainsworth Harry 28 Leeds 9b 734) His home address was 41 Dragon Parade, Harrogate, where he lived with his parents. He died aged 28 years of pneumonia, and was buried on 4 December 1918.
- Private Silas Harris Jennings (1894 – 28 April 1917). of the West Yorkshire Regiment and the Northumberland Fusiliers. Killed in action in France. Buried or memorialised at Arras Memorial CWGC Cemetery/Memorial Pas de Calais France, and memorialised at Grove Road Cemetery. Silas Jennings was reported missing on 28 April 1917. He was "last seen to go over with a Lewis gun, having had previously a narrow escape at the Front, where a large shell exploded near him, and he was incarcerated among 20 or 30 bags of sand. With the exception of suffering from shock he, however, appeared to have been none the worse for his mishap.".
- Private Walter Johnson (11 July 1896 – 8 November 1918) of the Canadian Machine Gun Corps. (Note: Private W. Johnson is buried in plot H.1643 of Grove Road Cemetery.)
- Private James Mckenna (1899 – 17 March 1920) of the Royal Army Service Corps. (Note: Private J. Mckenna is buried in plot K.42 of Grove Road Cemetery. GRO Index: Deaths Mar 1920 McKenna James 21 Knaresbro' 9a 150)

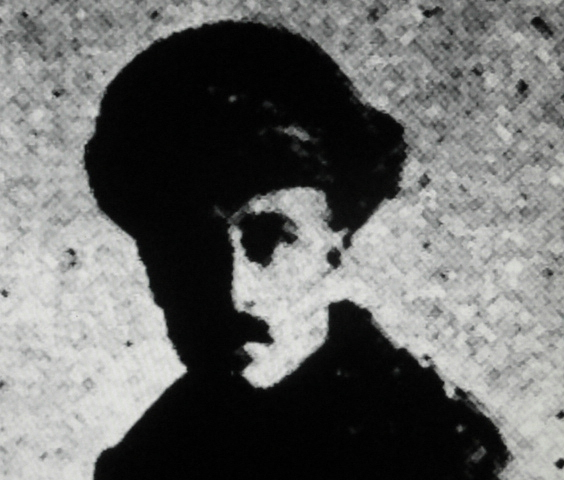
Pte H.L. Metcalfe

- Private Harold L. Metcalfe (1891 – 19 February 1919) of the West Yorkshire Regiment (Prince of Wales's Own). (Note: Private H.L. Metcalfe is buried in plot F.1239 of Grove Road Cemetery. GRO Index: Deaths Mar 1919 Metcalfe Harold L. 28 Knaresbro 9a 193) Private Metcalfe was gassed in September 1917, but recovered.
- Sapper Ernest W. Middleton (1892 – 16 February 1919) of the Royal Engineers. (Note: Sapper E.W. Middleton is buried in plot H.976 of Grove Road Cemetery. GRO Index: Deaths Mar 1919 Middleton Ernest W. 27 Knaresbro 9a 192)
- Corporal William Henry Mitchell (1883 – 13 June 1918) of the West Yorkshire Regiment (Prince of Wales's Own). (Note: Corporal W.H. Mitchell is buried in plot G.2286 of Grove Road Cemetery. GRO Index: Deaths Jun 1918 Mitchell William H. 35 Knaresbro 9a 150)
- Private Allan S. Reynard (1894 – 13 March 1920) of the Royal Army Medical Corps. (Note: Private A.S. Reynard is buried in plot F.2050 of Grove Road Cemetery. GRO Index: Deaths Mar 1920 Reynard Allen S. 26 Knaresbro' 9a 150)
- Sapper Frank Riley (1884 – 24 August 1920) of the Royal Engineers. (Note: Sapper F. Riley is buried in plot C.286 of Grove Road Cemetery. GRO Index: Deaths Sep 1920 Riley Frank 36 Knaresbro' 9a 112)
- Private Charles Ernest Simmonds (12 November 1875 – 18 March 1917) of the Canadian Expeditionary Force. (Note: Private C.E. Simmonds is buried in plot H.352 of Grove Road Cemetery. GRO Index: Deaths Mar 1917 Simmonds Charles E. 38 Knaresbro 9a 62)
- Private Arthur Henry Wells (1878 – 14 April 1915) of the West Yorkshire Regiment (Prince of Wales's Own). (Note: Private A.H. Wells is buried in plot I.276 of Grove Road Cemetery.)
- Private Vernice E. Whitehouse (1896 – 17 November 1918) of the West Yorkshire Regiment (Prince of Wales's Own). (Note: Private V.E. Whitehouse is buried in plot F.1254 of Grove Road Cemetery. GRO Index: Deaths Dec 1918 Whitehouse Vernice E. 22 Knaresbro 9a 202)
- Private Sydney Wilson (c.1891 – 24 May 1919) of the King's Own Yorkshire Light Infantry. (Note: Private S. Wilson is buried in plot G.2212 of Grove Road Cemetery. GRO Index: Deaths Jun 1919 Wilson Sydney W. 28 Knaresbro' 9a 126)

== Notable civilian burials and memorials ==
- Henry Edwin Bown (1845–1881), and his younger brother Arthur Bown (1851–1916), Harrogate architects whose partnership H. E. and A. Bown designed Harrogate's Jubilee Memorial and The Harrogate Club house.
- Robert Ackrill (1817–1894), who was the editor, then owner, of the Harrogate Herald newspaper, and several others. It was Ackrill who, in 1884 as Charter Mayor, met Harrogate's Charter of Incorporation on its train from London, and brought it in celebratory procession to the town centre, formally allowing the town to form its own borough council.
- Fridel Dalling-Hay, née Meyer (1908–1982), a Bavarian born refugee from Nazi Germany and a long-distance sea-kayaker who, in the 1930s, paddled to Westminster from Germany and attempted long-distance records along the British coast. She ran Beans Toy Shop in Harrogate's old Empire Theatre building, in the 1950s.
- George Dawson, a builder, property developer and lay preacher, who "shaped the layout and architectural appearance of central Harrogate" and became rich enough (and was witty enough) to name his mansion Vanderbilt Court.
- Richard Ellis (1821–1895), a builder and mayor of Harrogate, who improved and built much of the town, joining the villages of Low and High Harrogate into a single town, and helping to create the town council in 1884.
- John Farrah (1849–1907), a grocer, confectioner, biologist and meteorologist. (Note: John Farrah is buried in plot D 946 of Grove Road Cemetery)
- Rev. John Henry Gavin (1831–1868), the first minister at West Park United Reformed Church, Harrogate. (Note: Rev. John Henry Gavin is buried in plot G1123 of Grove Road Cemetery)
- William Grainge (1818 –1895), an English antiquarian and poet, and a historian of Yorkshire. (Note: William Grainge was interred in grave 1331 in section D of Grove Road Cemetery, Harrogate. It is a plain headstone with a semicircular top edge.)
- Thomas Holroyd (1821–1904), a Harrogate portrait and landscape painter, and patron of sculptor W.J.S. Webber. (Note: Harrogate Cemetery is now known as Grove Road Cemetery, Harrogate. Holroyd is buried in plot 836, in section C of the graveyard.)
- Sir John Ernest Neale (1890–1975), historian and biographer.
- William Pope (1825–1905), a clergyman and follower of the Oxford Movement, who seceded from Anglicanism to the Catholic Church in 1853. He was rector of St Robert's Church, Harrogate between 1889 and 1905.
- Thomas Rutling (1854 – 26 April 1915), a former Afro-American slave, and member of the Fisk Jubilee Choir. He was born in Wilson County, Tennessee, USA. He visited Harrogate with the choir in 1877, settled in the town in 1891 or 1905, and published an autobiography, Tom, in 1907. His memorial cross is inscribed: "Late Jubilee Singer, Fisk University". (Note: Thomas Rutling is buried in plot I.25 in Grove Road Cemetery)
- Daniel Schwarz (c.1851–1885), a travelling bandleader with the Schwarz Band, from Hinzweiler, Germany, who died suddenly while visiting the town with the band. He was the father of Otto Schwarz who later brought the Bavarian String Band to play in Harrogate bandstands between 1897 and 1914. (Note: GRO Index: Deaths Mar 1885 Schwarz Daniel. 34 Knaresbro' 9a 85. Daniel Schwarz is buried in a public grave in Grove Road Cemetery, plot E2491, i.e. paid for by Harrogate Corporation, so he has no gravestone. The plot is near the gravestone of Walker Harker.)
- Isaac Thomas Shutt (1818–1879), an architect, a farmer, and the proprietor of the Old Swan Hotel, Harrogate. He designed the Royal Pump Room, Harrogate. In partnership with Alfred Hill Thompson he co-designed the Church of All Saints, Harlow Hill. (Note: Isaac Thomas Shut is buried in plot D324 of Grove Road Cemetery.)
- David Simpson (1860–1931), a builder, a property developer, the first elected honorary Freeman of the Borough of Harrogate, mayor of Harrogate four times, county alderman, justice of the peace, and a member of the Harrogate Town Council for 34 years.
- John Smith (1792–1866), a rich banker of Harrogate who was born in Aberdeen but lived at Burley House, 12 Clarendon Road, Leeds (a Grade II listed building), and funded the building of Belvedere House, Harrogate.
- John Turner (1800 – 2 March 1883), miser of Starbeck.
- William John Seward Webber (1842–1919) a sculptor who created busts of local worthies, and the statue of Queen Victoria in Harrogate's Jubilee Memorial. He is buried in Grove Road Cemetery, but has no gravestone. (Note: Webber is buried in Grove Road Cemetery, Harrogate, in section G, plot 1372. His unmarked grave is near the tall Dickinson memorial. He is buried on the non-Anglican side of the cemetery, with the Roman Catholics, non-conformists etc.)
