= Robert Ackrill =

English newspaper owner (1816–1894)

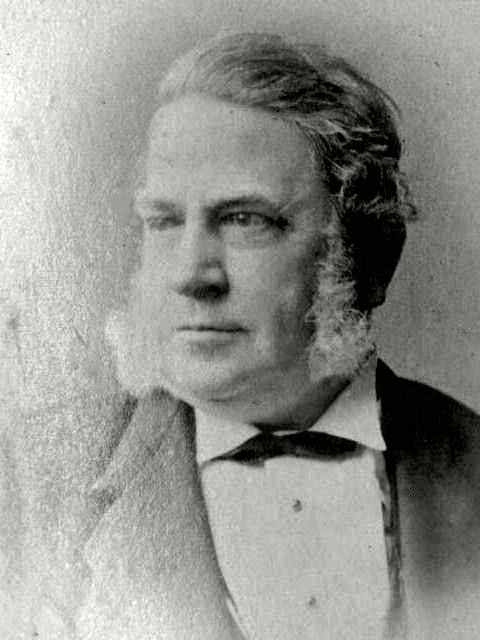
- Ackrill c. 1878
- Born: 1816; Worcester, England
- Died: 22 June 1894 (aged 77); Harrogate, England
- Resting place: Grove Road Cemetery, Harrogate
- Education: Apprenticeship at The Worcester Herald
- Occupations: Newspaper editor; proprietor; publisher; author
- Spouses: Emma Day (m. 1839; died 1842); Caroline Day (m. 1845)
- Writing career
- Years active: c. 1838–1890
- Subjects: News and local affairs
- Notable works: The Harrogate Herald; The Harrogate Advertiser; The Ripon Gazette; The Bedale and Northallerton Times; The Pateley Bridge and Nidderdale Herald; The Knaresborough Post
- Literary movement: Liberalism

Robert Ackrill (1816 – 22 June 1894) was an English journalist, newspaper proprietor, founder of newspapers, printer and writer, working for most of his career in Harrogate, England. During the 19th century he owned six newspapers in the North and West Ridings of Yorkshire, (Note: County borders have changed since Acrill's lifetime. His newspapers served some areas which were then in the North Riding of Yorkshire, and are now in North Yorkshire, and some areas which were then in the West Riding of Yorkshire but are now in North Yorkshire.) via his company Ackrill Newspapers, having founded three of them. Ackrill's descendants and relatives continued to run or be involved with Ackrill newspapers for at least a hundred years, the final incarnation of the company under that name being dissolved in 2020.

Ackrill was involved in the initial stages of the setting up of Harrogate Borough Council, and as Charter Mayor he met the train bringing its Charter of Incorporation from London, as part of a local celebration. He was a Provincial Grand Officer of the Freemasons for the West Riding. He was a public speaker who influenced local affairs, having some effect on decisions concerning the construction of Harrogate's railway lines and stations. He was a Liberal, involved in the Corn Laws agitation and the Chartist Movement. His funeral was a significant event in Harrogate, with local worthies, Freemasons, tradesmen and others accompanying the coffin to Grove Road Cemetery.

== Background ==
Ackrill's father was clock and watch maker Samuel Ackrill of Worcester (c.1776 – 11 September 1853), (Note: GRO Index: Deaths Sep 1853 Ackrill Samuel Worcester 6c 143) and his mother was Margaret Louisa (c.1779 – 14 April 1861). (Note: GRO Index: Deaths Jun 1861 Ackrill Margaret Louisa Birmingham 6d 3) Ackrill was born in 1816 on The Tything, a road in Worcester, England. He was baptised on 11 November 1816 in Claines, Worcester. Ackrill's nephew was Joseph Ackrill, a journalist on The Times. Ackrill's great nephew and son of Joseph, Charles Ackrill (d. 27 June 1894), was the war correspondent of The Madras Times. Joseph Ackrill was attending his uncle Robert Ackrill's funeral when news of Charles' death in India was received.

In 1839, Ackrill married Emma Day (c.1819 – 24 May 1842). (Note: GRO Index: Deaths Jun 1842 Ackrill Emma Worcester 18 374.) At Claines on 1 January 1845 he married Caroline Day (c.1824 – 1901) who was from Pershore. (Note: GRO Index: Deaths Dec 1901 Ackrill Caroline 78 Knaresbro' 9a 84. Marriages Mar 1845 Ackrill Robert, and Day Caroline, Droitwich XVIII 269) He had three children with Caroline: John William "Jack" (1849–1915), Ellen (1851–1932) and Thomas Samuel, who was born in Leeds. In the 1830s or 1840s, Ackrill moved from Worcester to Leeds or Harrogate spa, for the sake of his wife's health, although his newspaper obituaries do not specify which wife. By 1861, Ackrill and his wife Caroline were living in Royal Parade, Low Harrogate.

== Career ==
=== Worcester ===
Ackrill was apprenticed to the owner of The Worcester Herald, where he was trained as a compositor, and printer. On completion, the apprenticeship earned him freedom of the city of Worcester, because in that era the freedom of the city could be inherited from a master who had that freedom. During Ackrill's working life, that practice ceased, but The Worcester Journal reminisced on how it worked:

In former times, a workman became a freeman by virtue of being apprenticed to one who was a freeman, and by himself taking up his freedom before the Mayor. Before the borough franchise was lowered, a working man thus often obtained a vote to which he would not have been entitled by his tenure of property. There was no dual vote. Then, of course, there was the distinction of being an accredited citizen of no mean city [i.e. Worcester], besides certain mundane privileges in the form of grazing rights on Pitchcroft, and of preference in application for certain almshouses.

Before he had completed his apprenticeship, "[Ackrill] had developed such qualities as a newspaper reporter" that he was given a permanent job as a journalist, and he "became well known in the Worcester district".

=== Leeds ===
When Ackrill arrived in Leeds in the 1830s or 1840s, he met, and was influenced by, Samuel Smiles who was then employed by the Leeds Times, and was later to write Self Help in 1859. After working on various newspapers in the North of England, Ackrill was hired as a journalist on the Leeds Mercury, where "he was a colleague of some of the best known and most successful writers of the time. He followed the late John Bright and Richard Cobden throughout the Corn Law agitation, and was in the thick of the Chartist Movement". He had the chance of a "desirable position" on The Times and other "flattering offers" emanating from London, but had to decline them due to his wife's health.

=== Harrogate ===
When stationer and printer William Dawson started up Harrogate's first newspaper, The Harrogate Herald, in May 1847, Ackrill was hired as editor, although he was still living in Leeds. He was "the first shorthand writer to give reports of local proceedings". He was then aged 30 years, and it was not long before he bought the paper from Dawson. It was a humble beginning for a newspaper owner, with the paper being transported to Harrogate from its printer in Leeds by mule and cart. On one occasion the mule "went lame" and the drivers had to pull the cart. He subsequently founded the Herald Printing Works in Harrogate.

By 1871, Ackrill was describing himself as a letterpress printer, and master of eight men and five boys. Ackrill was a Liberal who took part in local political activity, so when he purchased the Herald from Dawson, that newspaper' began a rivalry with the town's other paper, the Conservative Harrogate Advertiser, which was founded 1836 and run by Thomas Hollins. When the Advertiser became too successful in the 1870s, Ackrill bought it as a sister paper to the Herald, and founded Ackrill Newspapers. He expanded the business and bought The Ripon Gazette, and also founded The Bedale and Northallerton Times, The Pateley Bridge and Nidderdale Herald, and The Knaresborough Post, "all of which newspapers became ... the recognised local organ of their respective districts". Of those newspapers, the Harrogate Advertiser (incorporating The Ripon Gazette, The Pateley Bridge and Nidderdale Herald and The Knaresborough Post) still exists. As of 2018, The Bedale and Northallerton Times still existed as The Thirsk, Bedale and Northallerton Times, a weekly with a tiny circulation.

Ackrill was a benefactor to Harrogate, and "did good service to Liberalism as a journalist during the Corn Law agitation, and for many years afterwards". For a long time before the end of his career, he was "designated the "father of reporters" in Yorkshire, and The Athaenium called him "one of the oldest of provincial journalists".

Robert Ackrill spawned a dynasty which kept Ackrill Newspapers running for a long time. In 1878, Ackrill's editor for the Herald, William Hammond Breare, married Ellen, Ackrill's daughter. Breare edited the Herald for fifty years, and members of the Breare family remained involved with the paper for at least a hundred years. Ackrill's son Jack was proprietor of Ackrill Newspapers by 1881, and was involved with the business until 1915. Robert Ackrill Breare, son of W.H. Breare and Ellen Ackrill, ran Ackrill Newspapers until 1955, when his son William Robert Ackrill Breare took over. Robert Roddick Ackrill Breare was the last of the dynasty to run the company, from 1957 to around 1985, when the company was sold to United Newspapers. The company name survived under various ownerships until its last incarnation was incorporated on 12 May 1982, and dissolved on 5 November 2020.

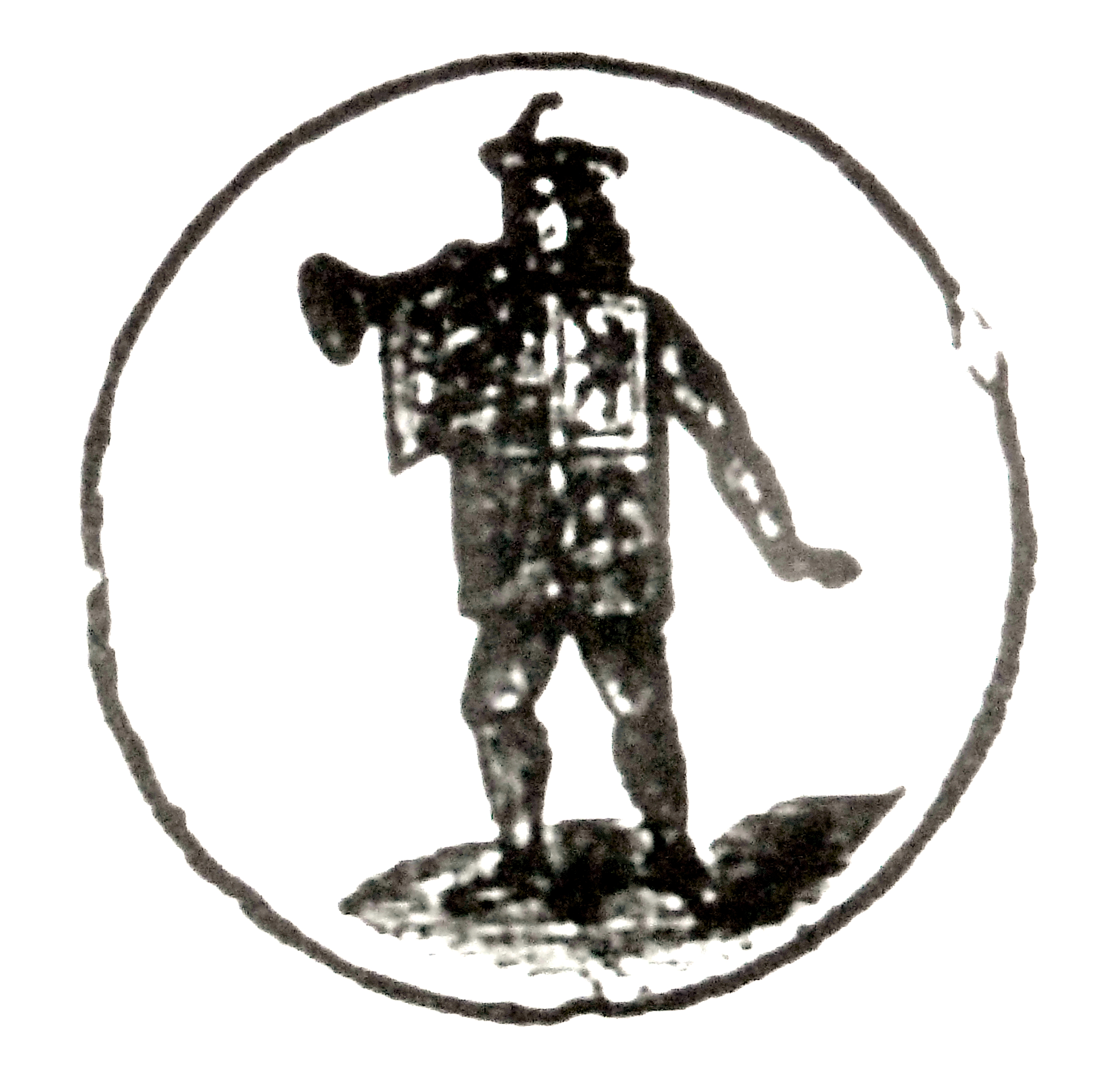
Logo of Ackrill Newspapers, 1883

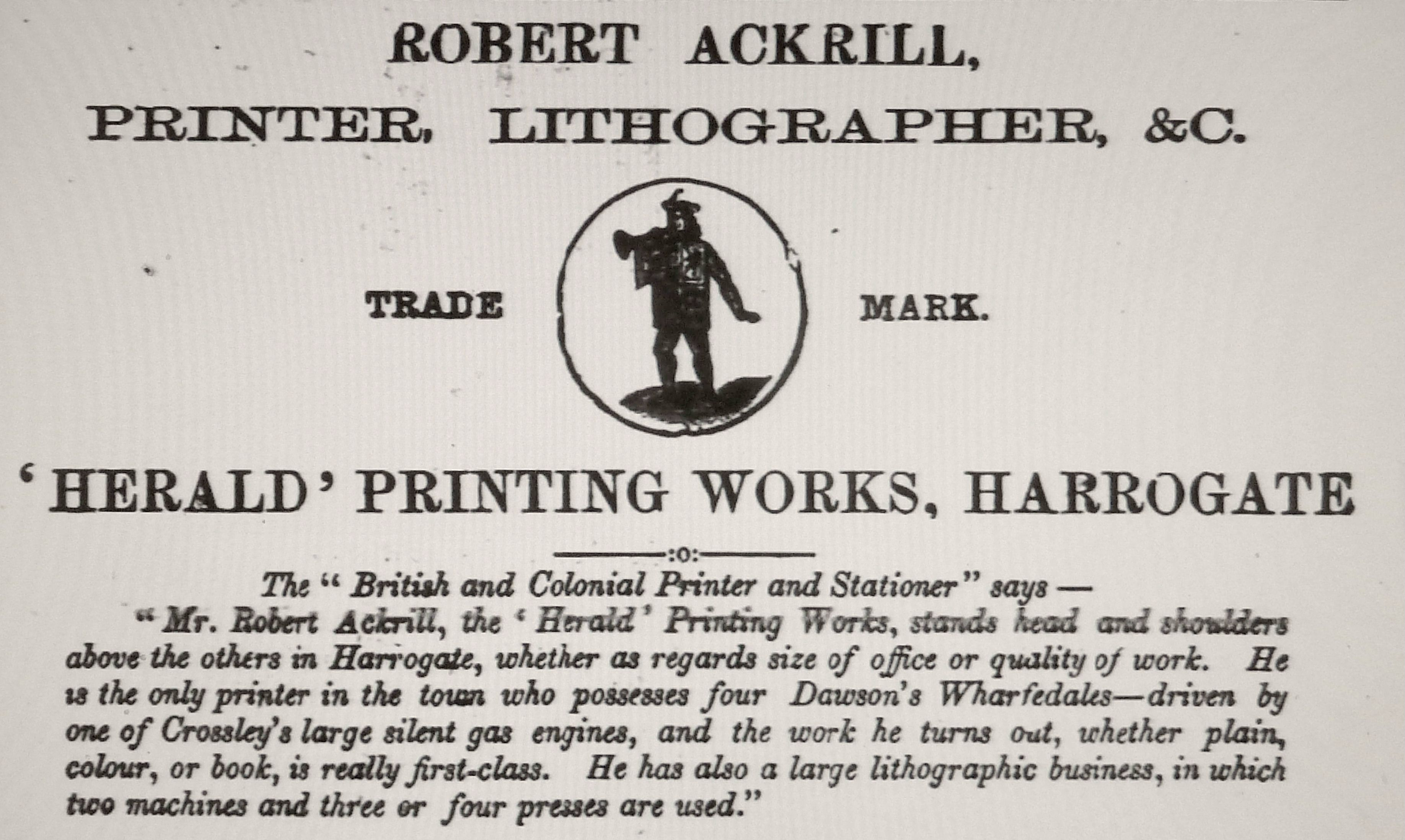
Ad for Ackrill's printing works, 1883

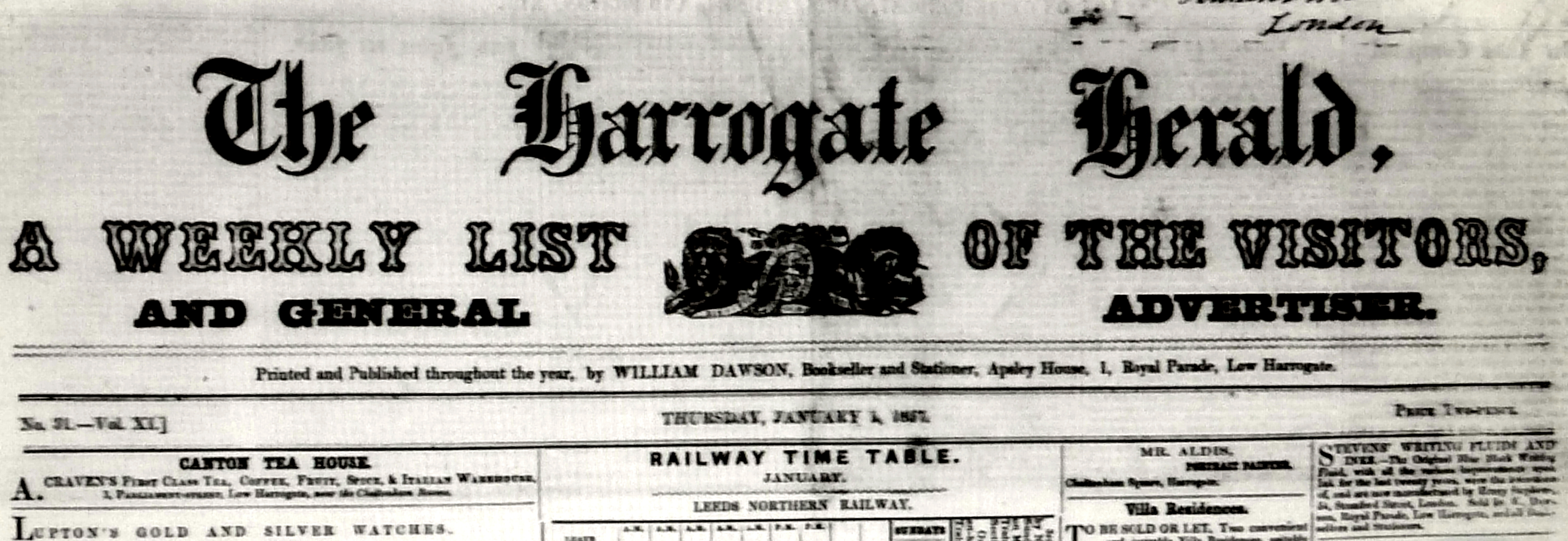
Harrogate Herald masthead, 1857

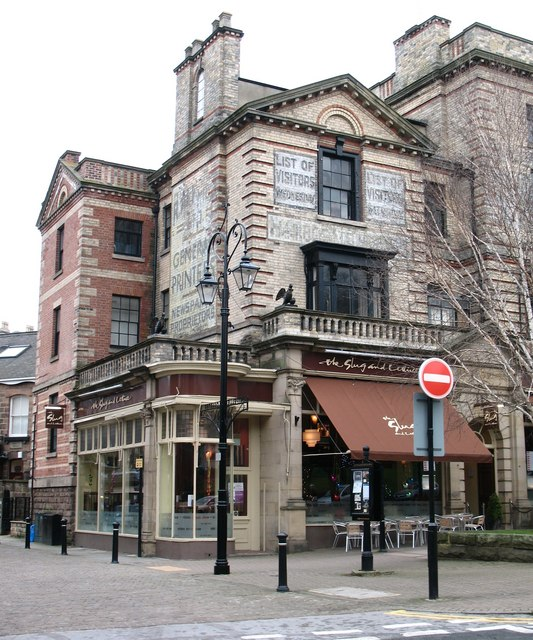
Herald Building: Ackrill's former printing works

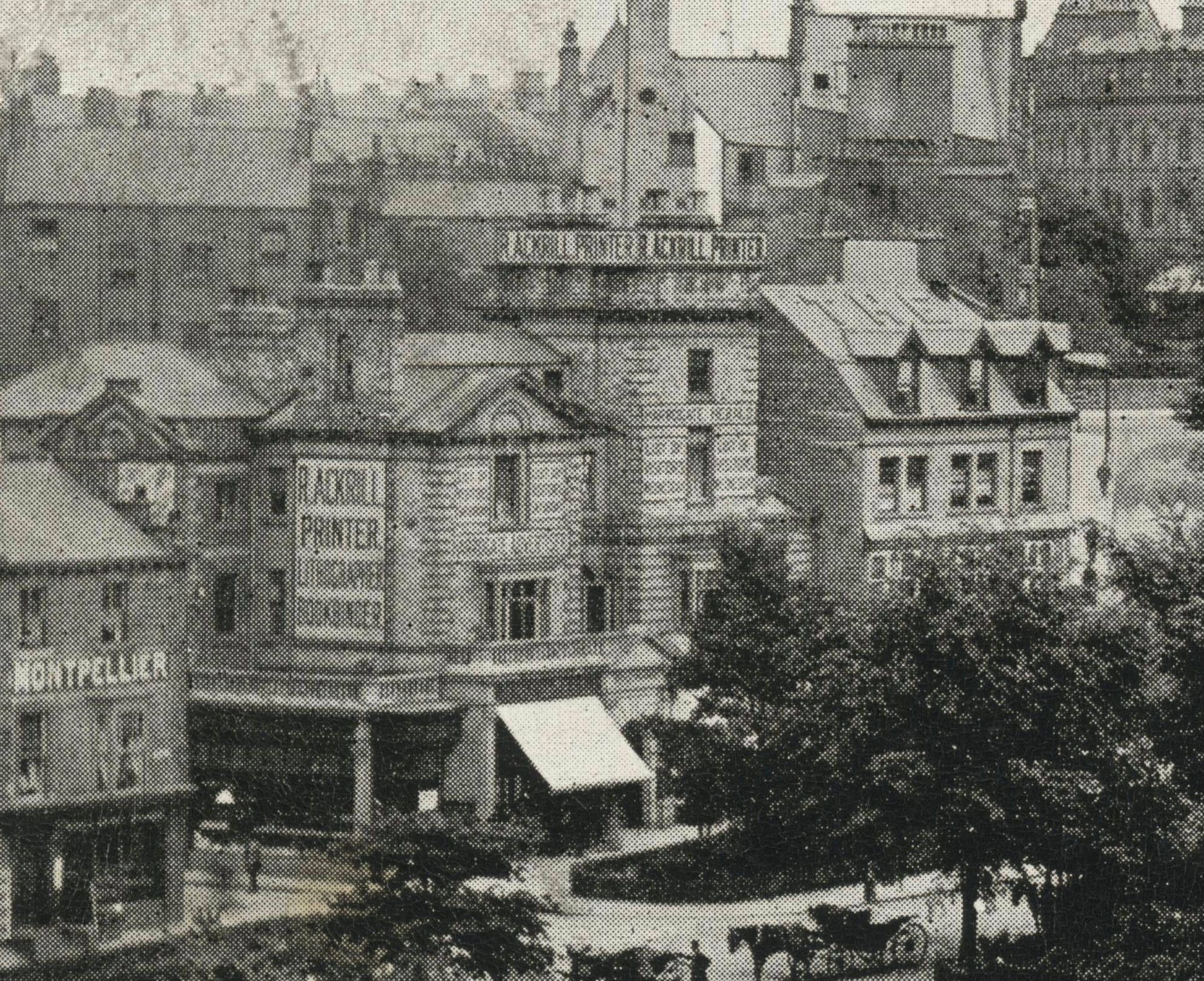
Herald Building between 1901 and 1910

== Other activities ==
=== Charter of incorporation ===
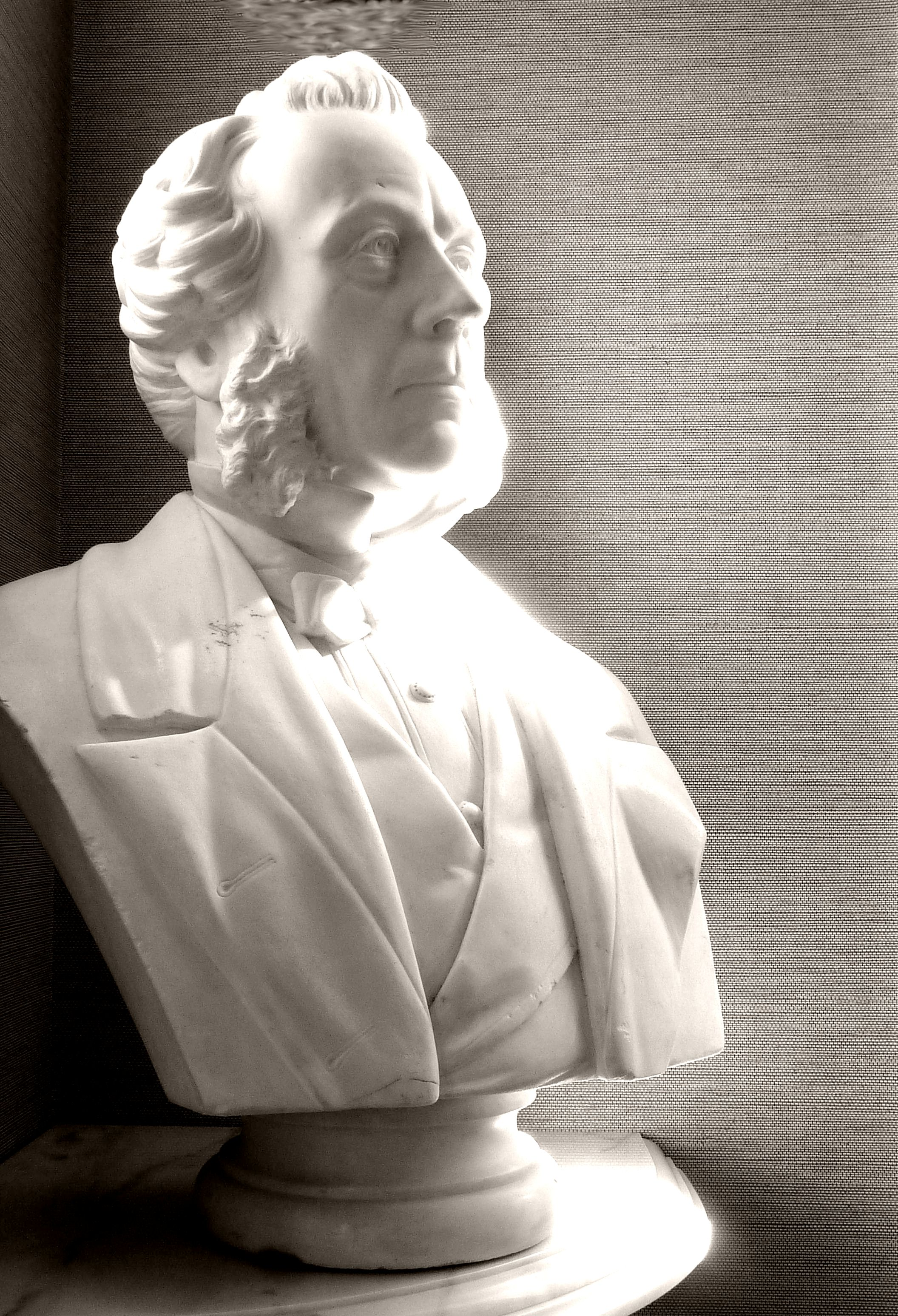
Bust of Ackrill by A. Welsh

Ackrill was involved from the beginning, in Harrogate's push for a charter of incorporation. The town had expanded to the extent that it needed its own mayor and corporation. Ackrill contributed to meetings and, alongside many of the town's worthies, signed the formal memorial of 12 March 1883 sent to the improvement commissioners, saying that the townspeople wanted to begin the process of obtaining the charter. It was Ackrill who, in 1884, as one of its former promoters and as Charter Mayor, met the train which brought Harrogate's Charter of Incorporation from London, allowing the town to form its own borough council. After a celebratory procession from the station, with decorated streets and the ringing of church bells, he gave a public speech from a stand in front of the New Victoria Baths. Ackrill's bust (pictured, right) by Leeds sculptor Anthony Welsh is undated, but it is possible that it commemorates his time as Charter Mayor. "[Ackrill's] name stands upon that document prominently, and on him devolved the duty of carrying out some of the earlier preliminary stages connected with the Municipal Incorporations Act".

=== Business and social ===
Ackrill was a Provincial Grand Officer of the Freemasons for the West Riding. While the construction St Mary's Church in Low Harrogate was being developed, he was churchwarden there. He was a "speaker of acknowledged influence and fluency". He rendered "important service" when decisions were being made on the location and route of the local railway system, which was under construction during his lifetime, and that railway was to be the "turning point in Harrogate's prosperity". He was "an active promoter of many of the institutions of Harrogate", including the Northallerton Local Board of Health, of which he was chairman in 1870. He was a director of the Knaresborough, Harrogate and Clare Building Society, and one of the governors of the Bath and Cottage Hospital, Harrogate. Ackrill was also involved in a project for the town to fund a permanent band. This was to be Sidney Jones and his Harrogate Band, which in due course performed while the spa visitors drank the waters, thus encouraging visitor attendance and increasing receipts.

=== Local enquiries ===
Ackrill gave "important evidence" on the Chartist Movement when it was the subject of a local enquiry, "and his cross-examination was regarded as a matter of interesting history". Another enquiry to which he gave evidence was the 1845 trial at the Lent Assizes of eleven poachers from Pershore who were accused of murdering Thomas Staite, a watcher employed by the Earl of Coventry. They had left Staite "lying terribly wounded in a ditch", unable to speak, and he died within six days, at Worcester Infirmary. In spite of one poacher turning Queen's evidence, and another confessing, all the men were found guilty of manslaughter. Eight of the men were transported, and two were imprisoned.

== Publications ==
=== Newspapers ===
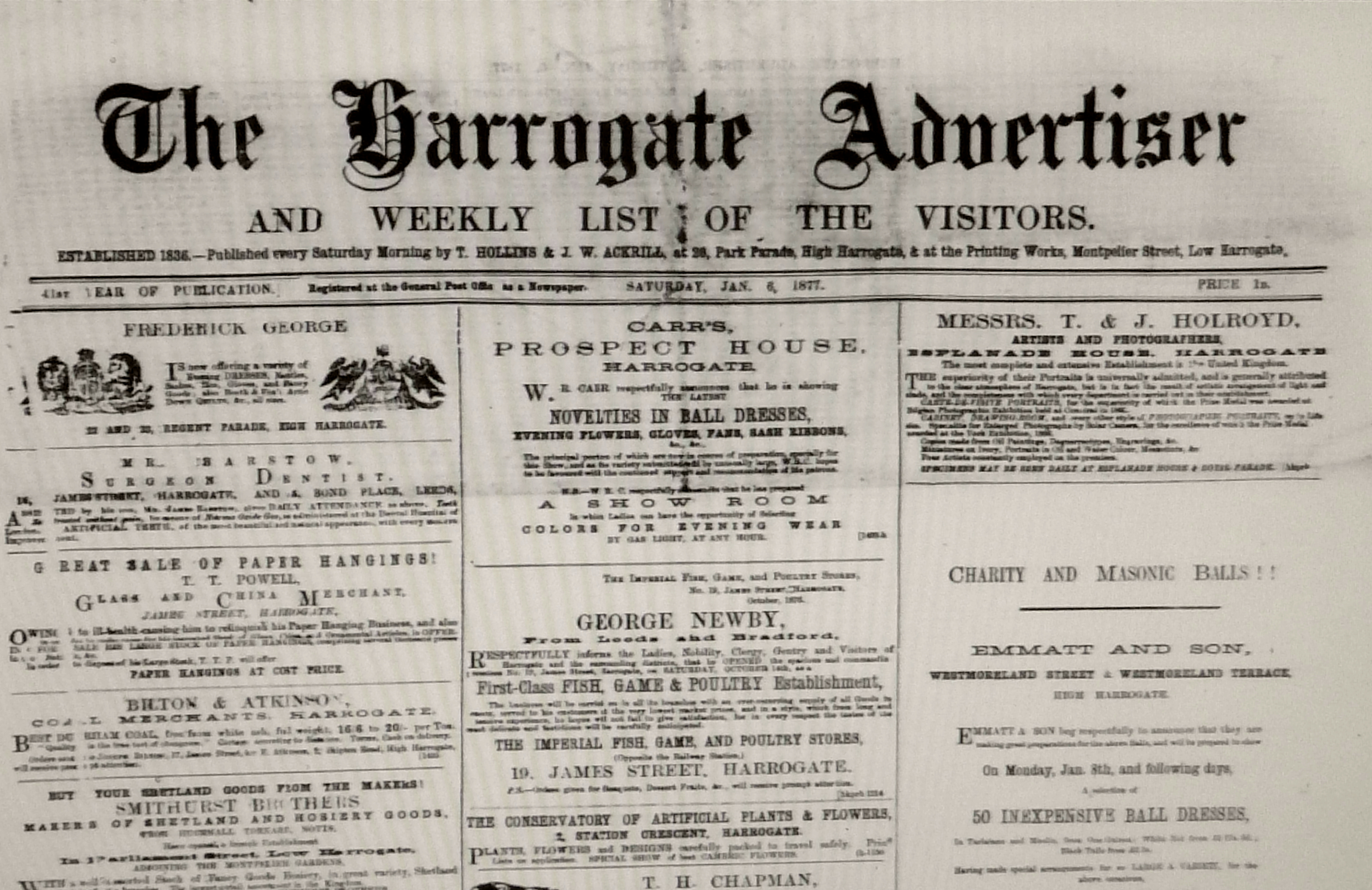
Harrogate Advertiser masthead, 1877

Note: Ackrill bought The Harrogate Herald, The Harrogate Advertiser and The Ripon Gazette, and he was a journalist on The Harrogate Herald for half a century. He founded and owned The Bedale and Northallerton Times, The Pateley Bridge and Nidderdale Herald, and The Knaresborough Post. All his papers were owned via his company, Ackrill Newspapers.

- The Harrogate Herald (1847–1957).
- The Harrogate Advertiser.
- The Ripon Gazette.
- The Bedale and Northallerton Times.
- The Pateley Bridge and Nidderdale Herald.
- The Knaresborough Post.

=== Books ===
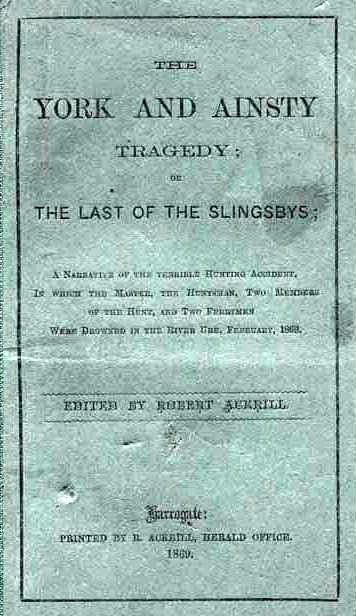
The York and Ainsty Tragedy by Ackrill

- Ackrill, Robert (1869). The York and Ainsty Tragedy, the last of the Slingsbys. Herald Office, Harrogate: Robert Ackrill. "a narrative of the terrible hunting accident, in which the Master, the Huntsman, two members of the hunt and two Ferrymen were drowned in the river Ure, February 1869"
- Ackrill, Robert (1878). A Scamper from Yorkshire to the United States, with a Glance at Canada. Harrogate, England: R. Ackrill.
- Ackrill, Robert, ed. (1881). Harrogate Directory. Harrogate: Robert Ackrill, printer. "containing a list of residents, with their dwellings and occupations; a street guide, with the names of the residents"

== Death ==
Ackrill retired a few years before he died, due to failing health. "The beginning of the end approached" about two weeks before he died at his home in Swan Road, Harrogate, on 22 June 1894, aged 77, leaving a widow, a son and daughter, and four grandsons. (Note: GRO Index: Deaths Jun 1894 Ackrill Robert 77 Knaresbro' 9a 79.) The Bradford Weekly Telegraph commented: "By [Ackrill's] death ... Harrogate loses a townsman to whom it owed much, for his energy and foresight were due many of the improvements [to the town] effected during the past thirty years. This sentiment was echoed by other papers, including The Times, which said: "To his energy and forethought, Harrogate is indebted for many important improvements [to the town]".

=== Funeral ===
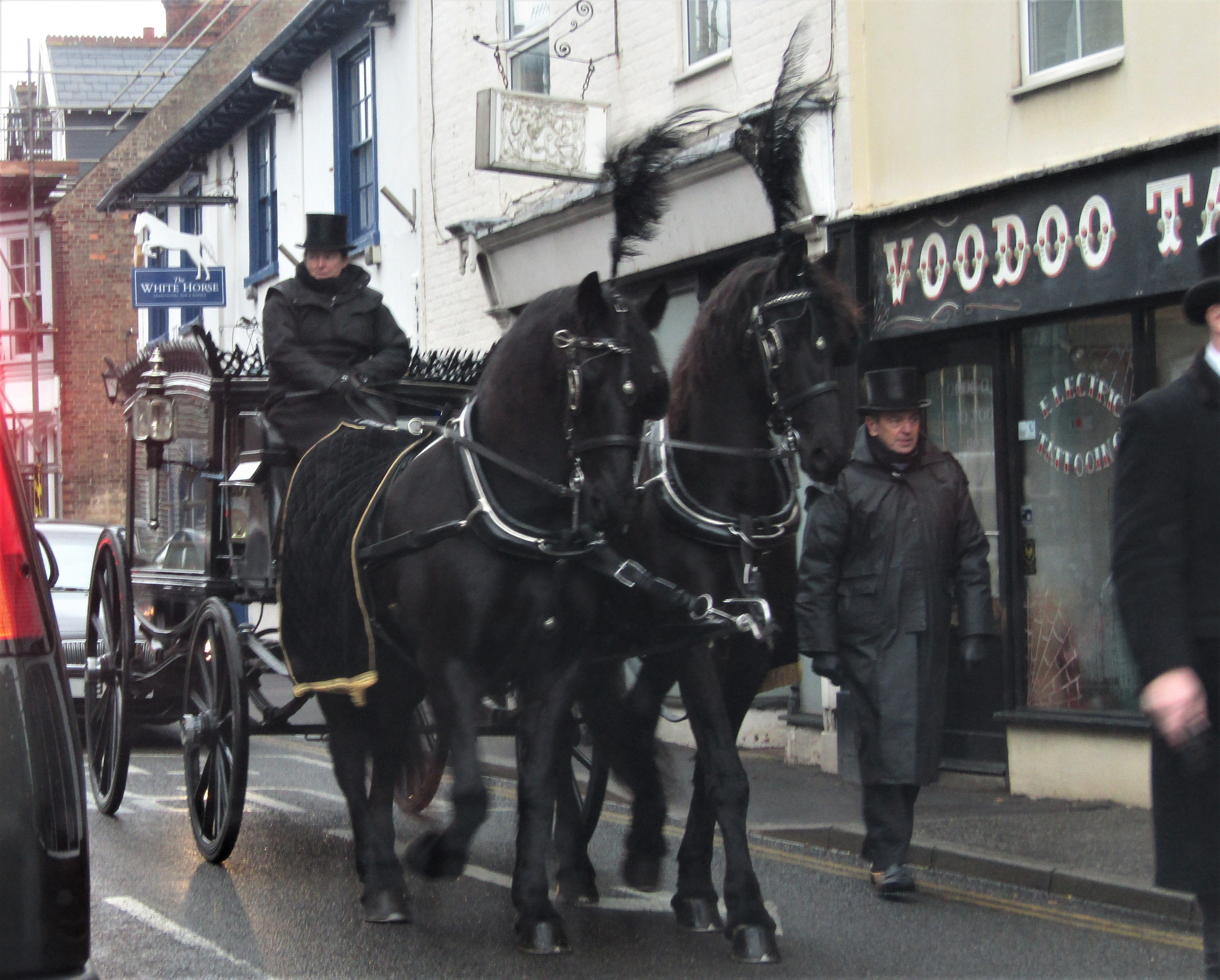
Horse-drawn hearse, of a type which might have been used in 1894

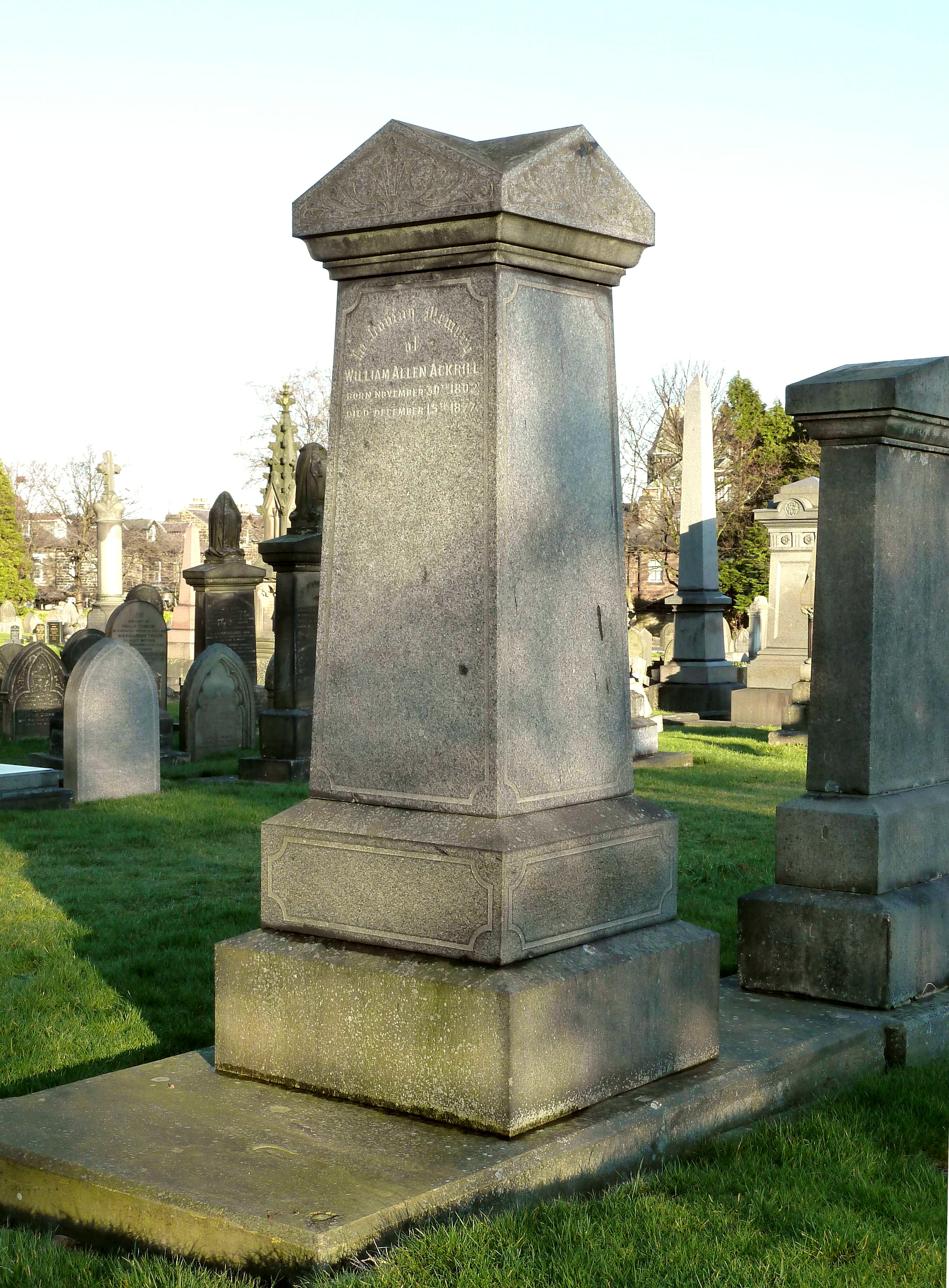
Ackrill's grave monument

Ackrill was buried on 25 June 1894, "amidst general manifestations of regret and sympathy". The 'York Herald said, "His demise removes another landmark in the history and development of Harrogate". Even before the funeral procession left Ackrill's home, there was already "a large concourse of friends of the deceased" who had gathered to show respect, and many of them went on to lead the procession.

As the cortège left Ackrill's home, all the blinds of the houses along the way were drawn, according to custom, and the bells of St Mary's Church "rung a muffled peal". On foot, at the front of the funeral procession, were "a large number of tradesmen" who had known him. Following the tradesmen were Ackrill's employees and journalists. After them, walked his Masonic friends, "wearing white gloves and sprigs of acacia". The American walnut and polished oak coffin was covered in flowers given by friends and relatives. Besides the hearse, the funeral procession included "seven mourning coaches and a large number of private carriages". In the common practice of the time, the official mourners were all male, so the chief mourners in the first coach were Ackrill's closest male relatives. Beside the procession, which included Thomas Holroyd, many other local people were walking to the graveyard. The procession went from Swan Road, via Walker Road (now called King's Road), to Grove Road Cemetery, a distance of nearly 1 mile (1.6 km).

The first part of the burial service was taken by the Reverend A.H. Rix, who met the hearse at the gate, and followed it to the cemetery's Anglican chapel. Afterwards, the second part of the service took place at the graveside, and the coffin was placed in the family vault within the cemetery. The plate on Ackrill's coffin said: "Robert Ackrill. Died June 22, 1894. Aged 77 years".
