= RSML =

RSML may refer to:

- 16S rRNA (cytidine1402-2'-O)-methyltransferase, an enzyme
- Republican Scientific Medical Library
