= Ferrovitreous =

Ferro (iron) and vitreous (glass) construction combined the use of glass and iron in the eighteenth century and can be seen developing as early as the seventeenth century. Popularized during the Industrial Revolution as iron and steel production became more common throughout Europe and frequently utilized in world exhibitions. Notable examples include Paxton's Crystal Palace, the Palm House at Kew Gardens, and the Coal Exchange.

== Gallery ==
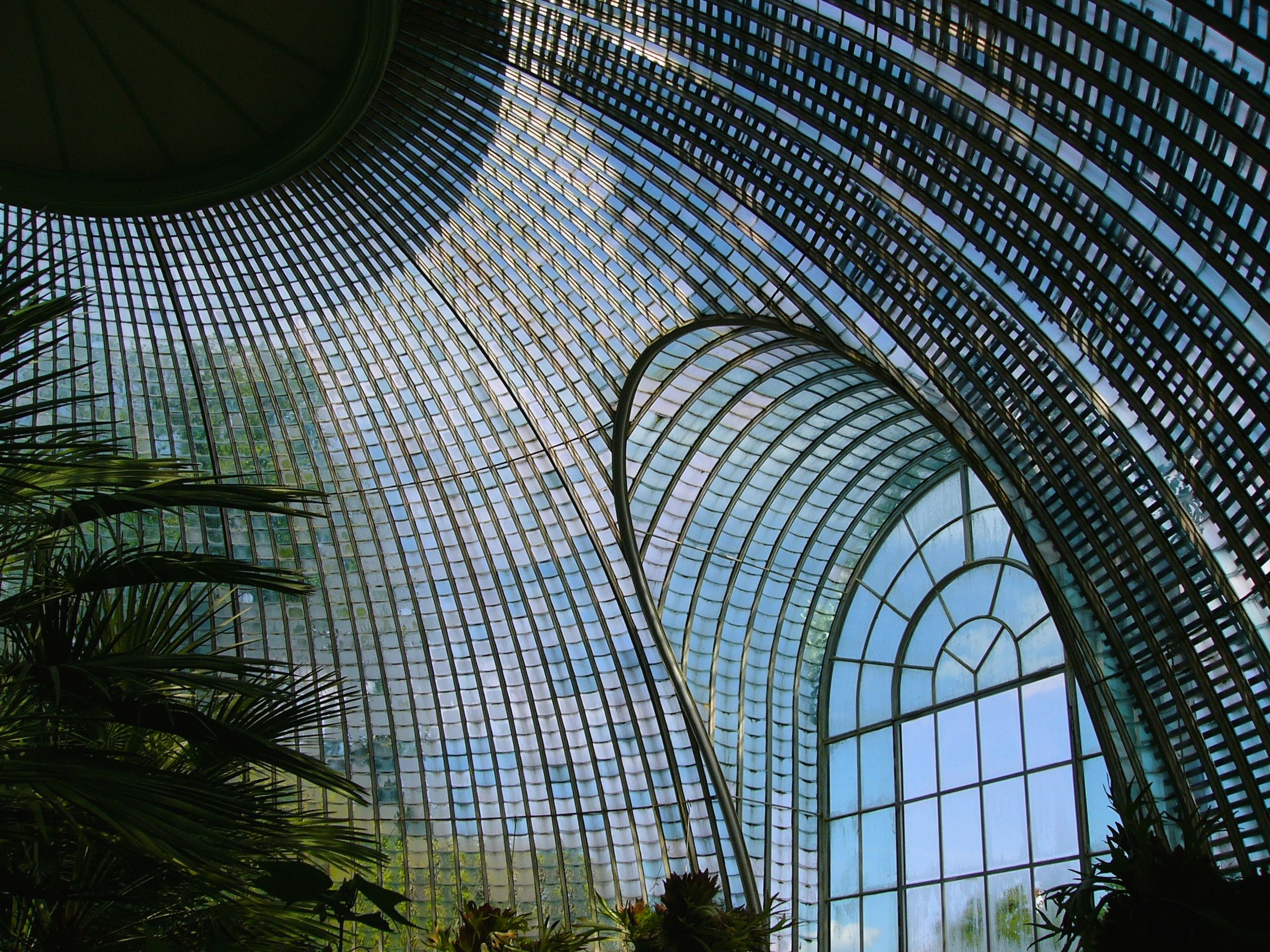
Greenhouse of Lednice Castle, Czech Republic, 1845

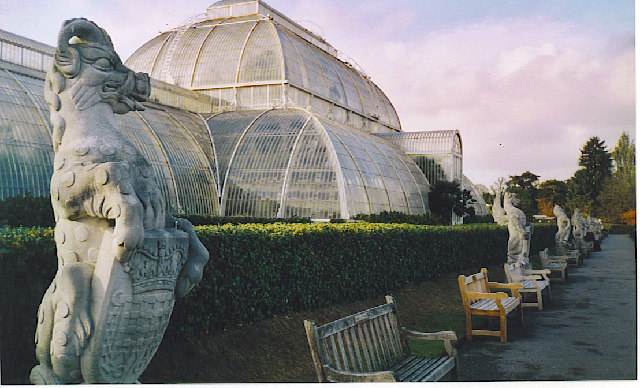
Kew's Palm House (Royal Botanic Gardens, Kew), England, 1849

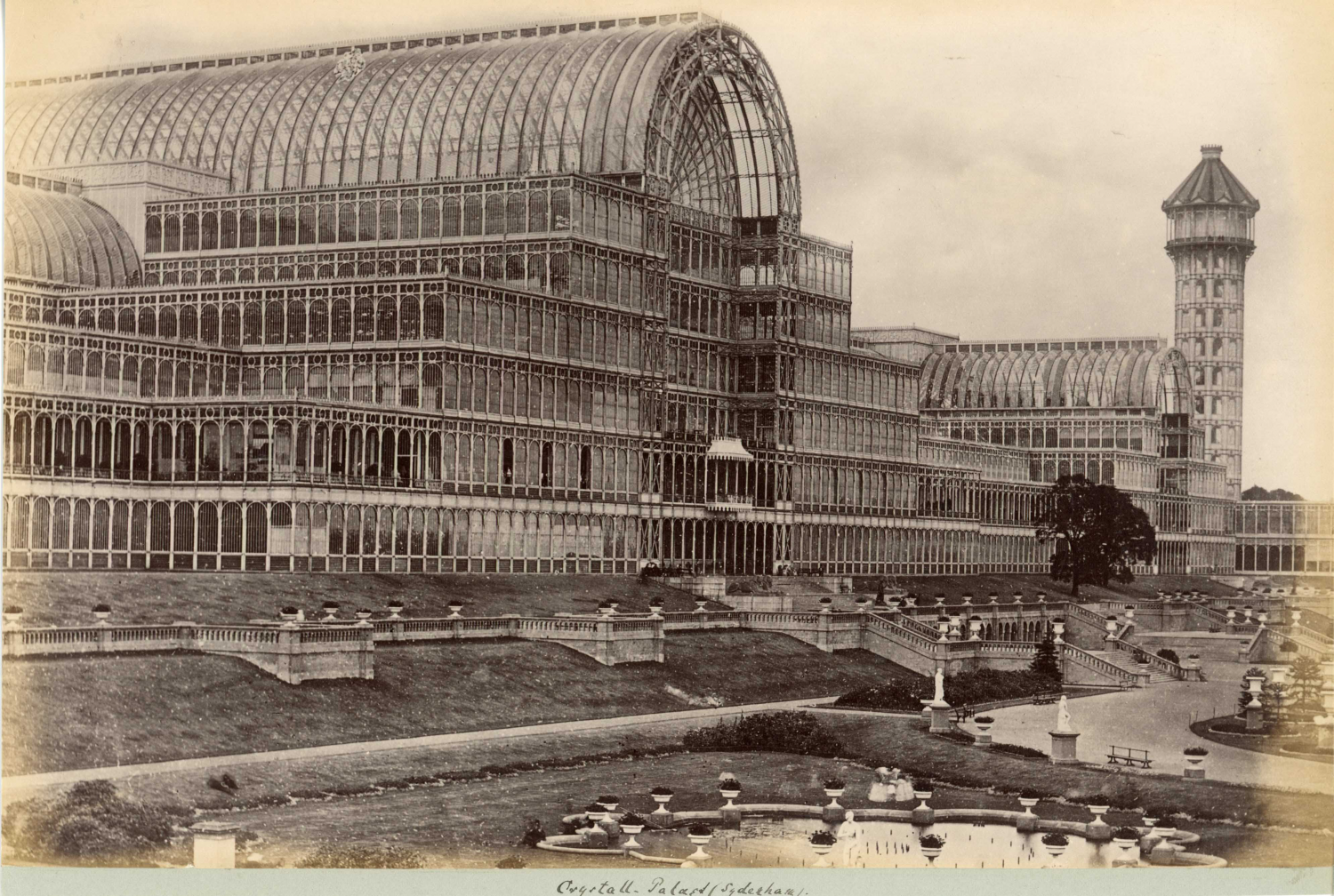
The Crystal Palace, Sydenham, London, 1851

Galleria Vittorio Emanuele II, Milan, 1867

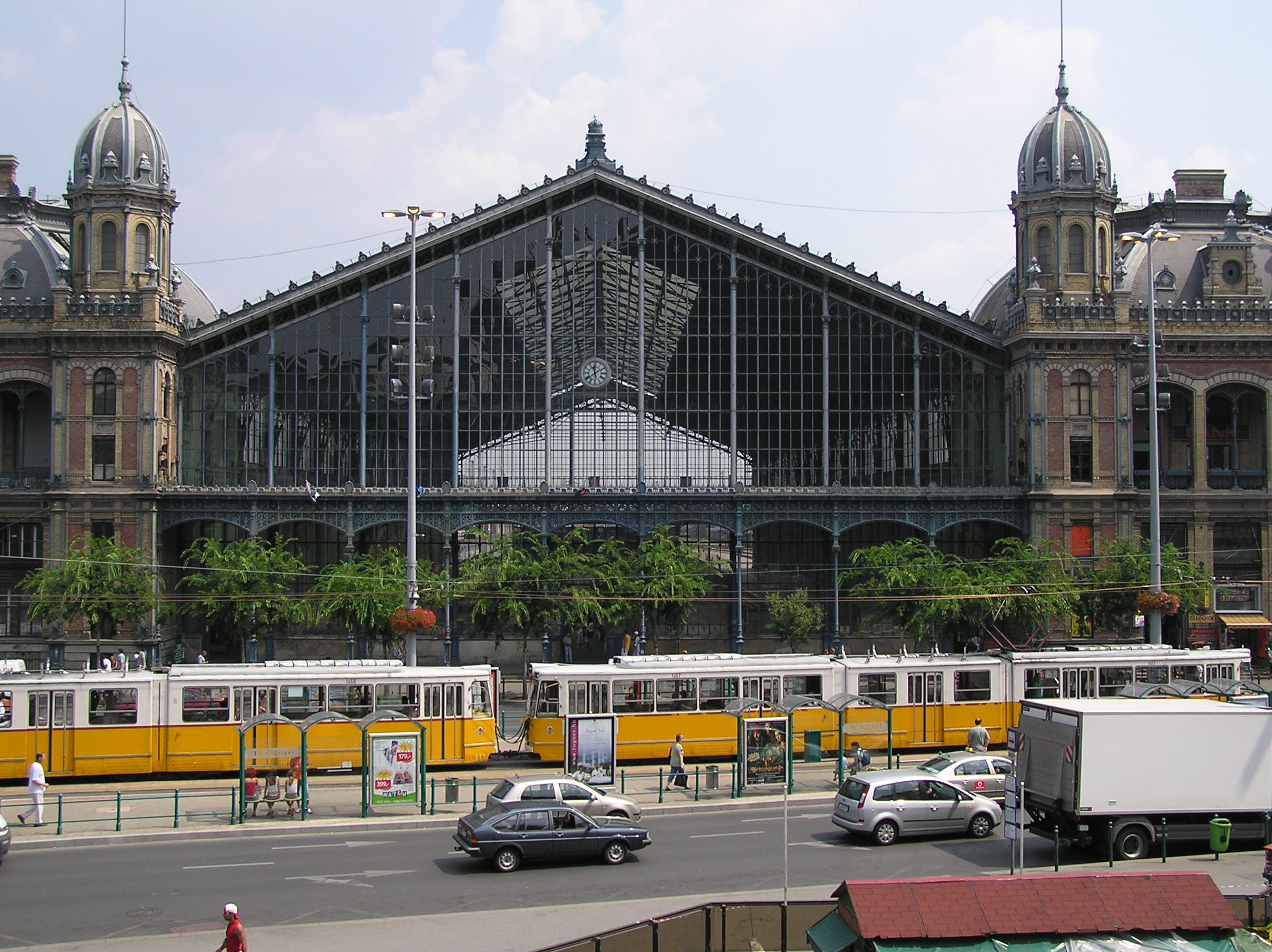
Budapest-Nyugati railway station, August de Serres (Eiffel company) (1877)

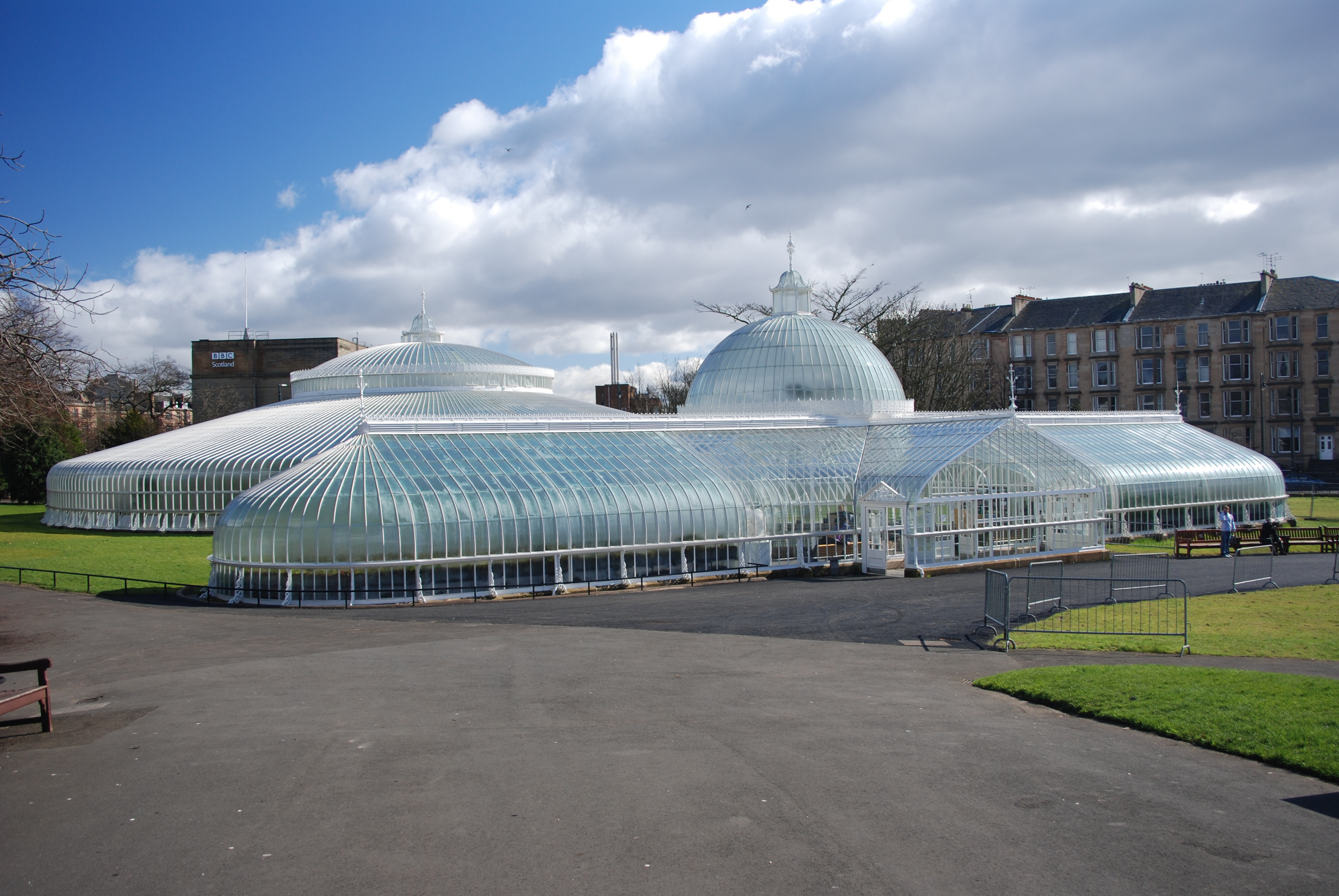
Glasgow Botanic Gardens, Scotland, 1873

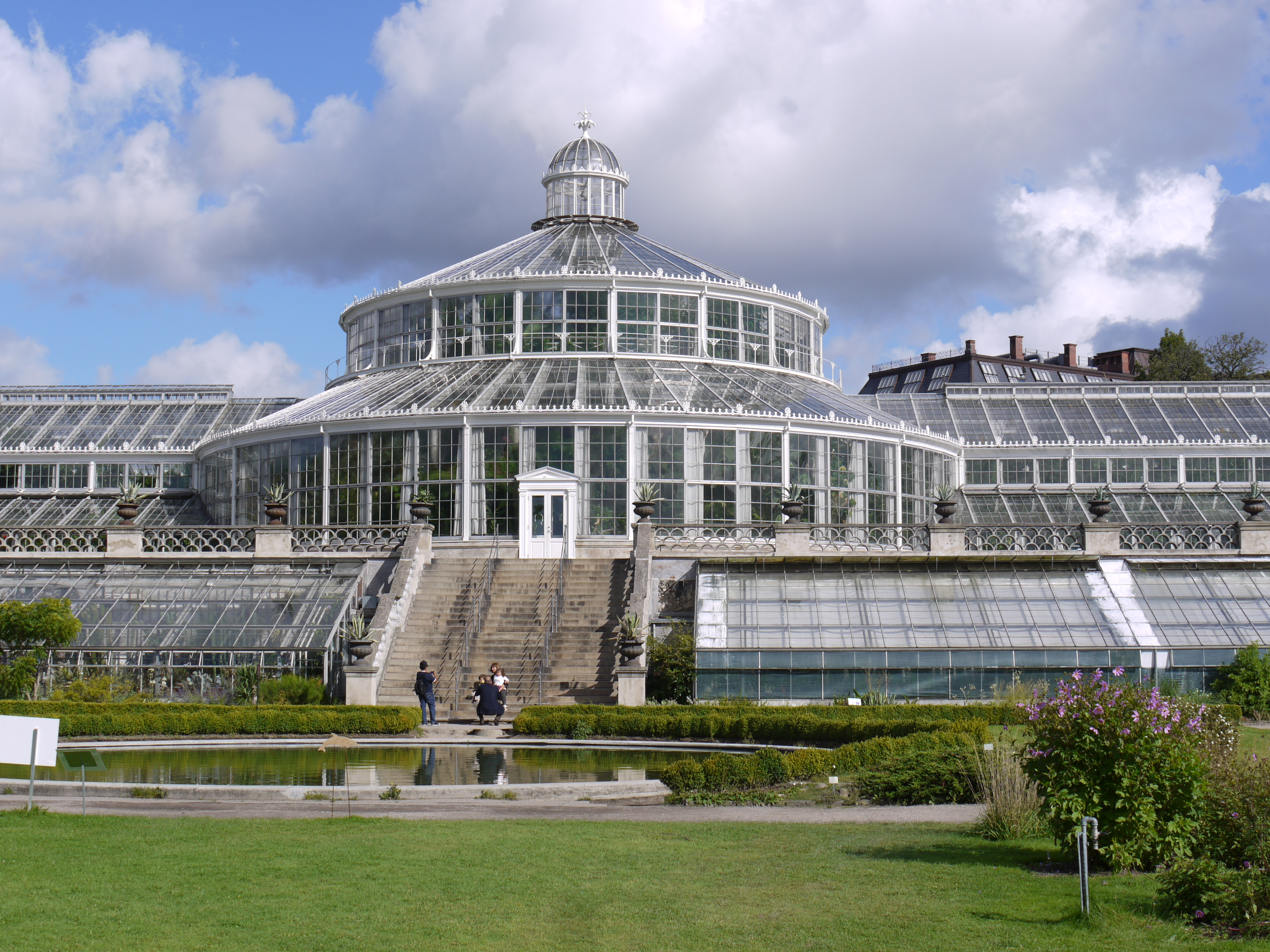
Copenhagen Botanical Garden, Denmark, 1874

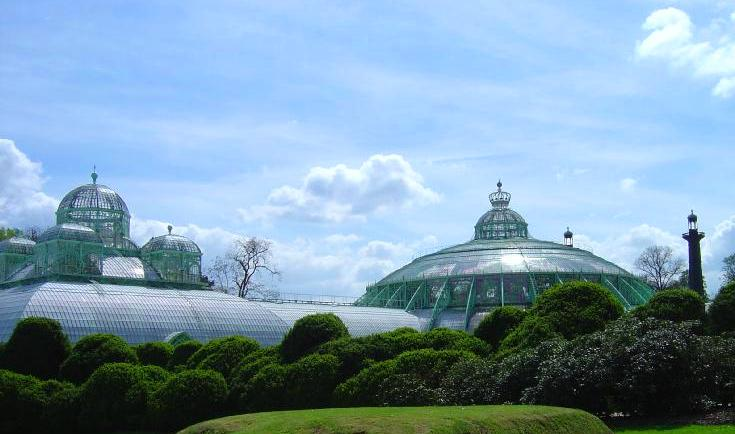
Royal Greenhouses of Laeken, Brussels, 1880

Old Louisiana State Capitol, USA, 1882

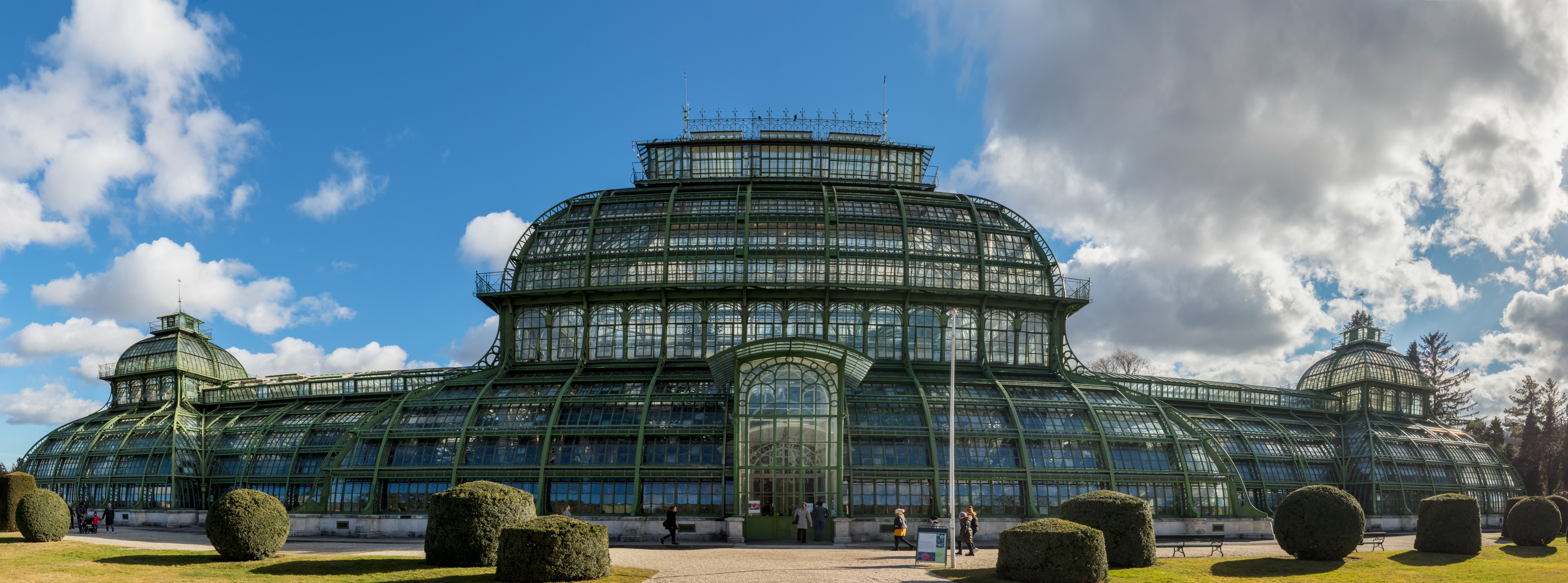
Palmenhaus Schönbrunn, Austria, 1882

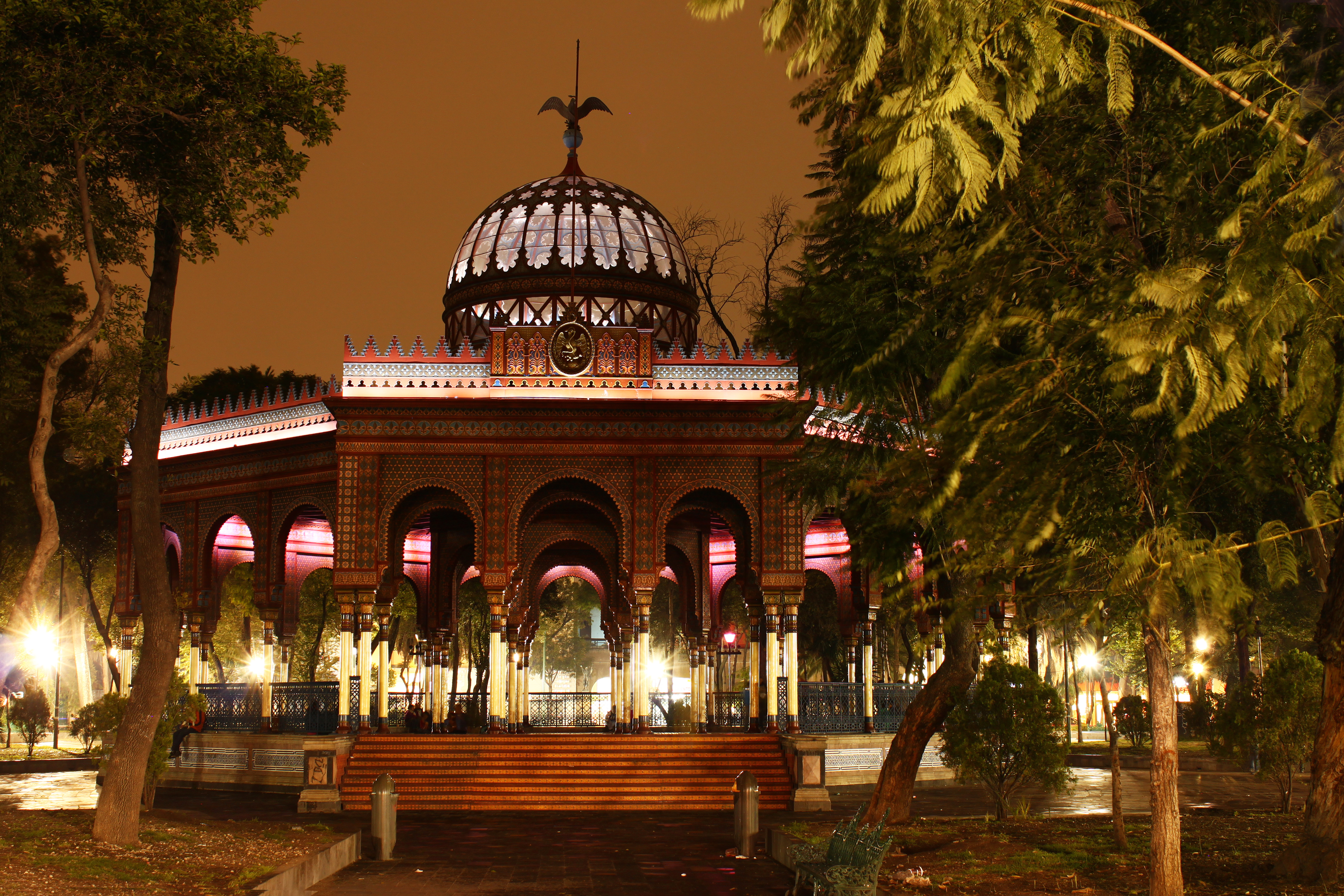
Kiosco Morisco, Mexico City, 1884

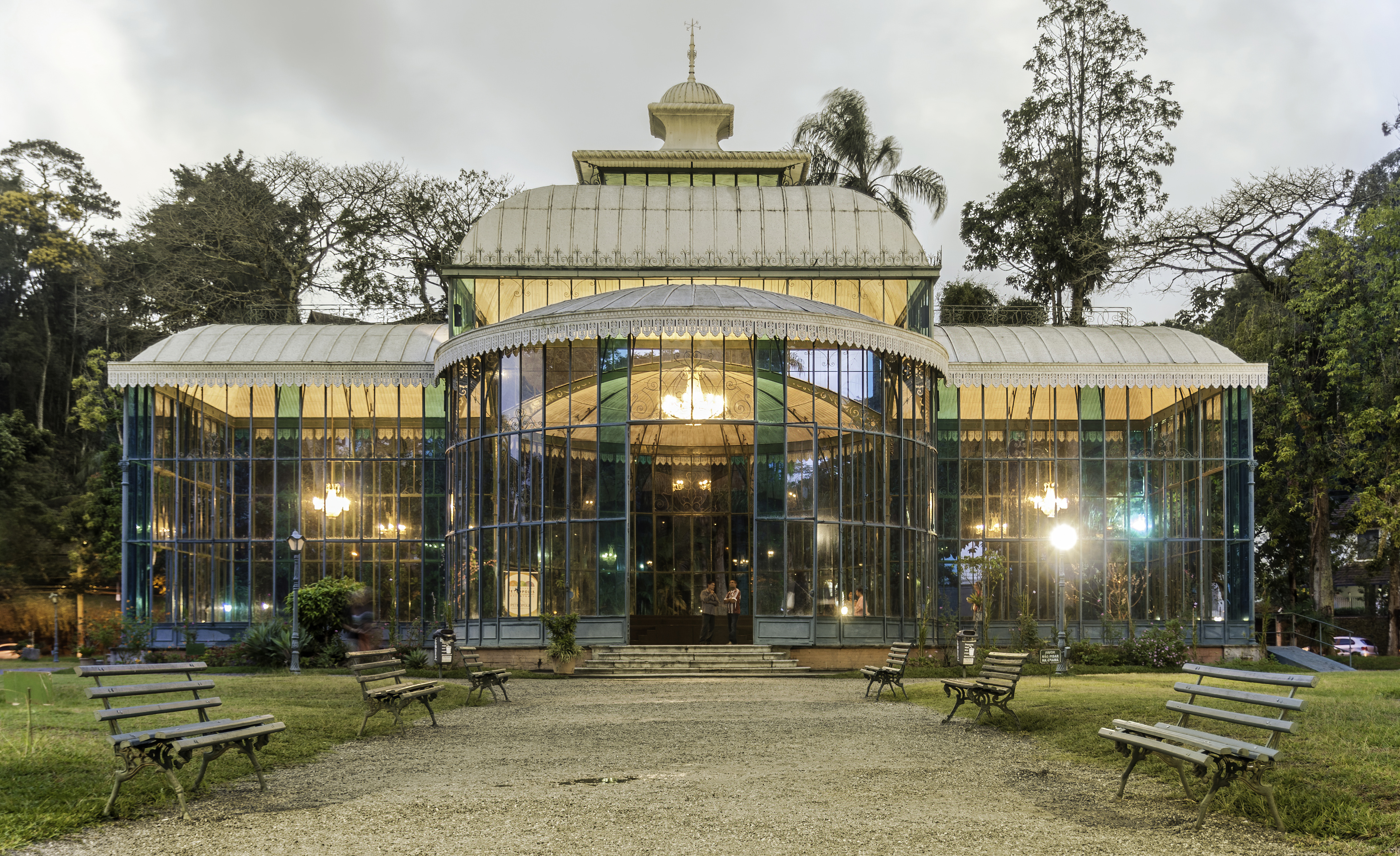
Crystal Palace, Petrópolis, Brazil, 1884

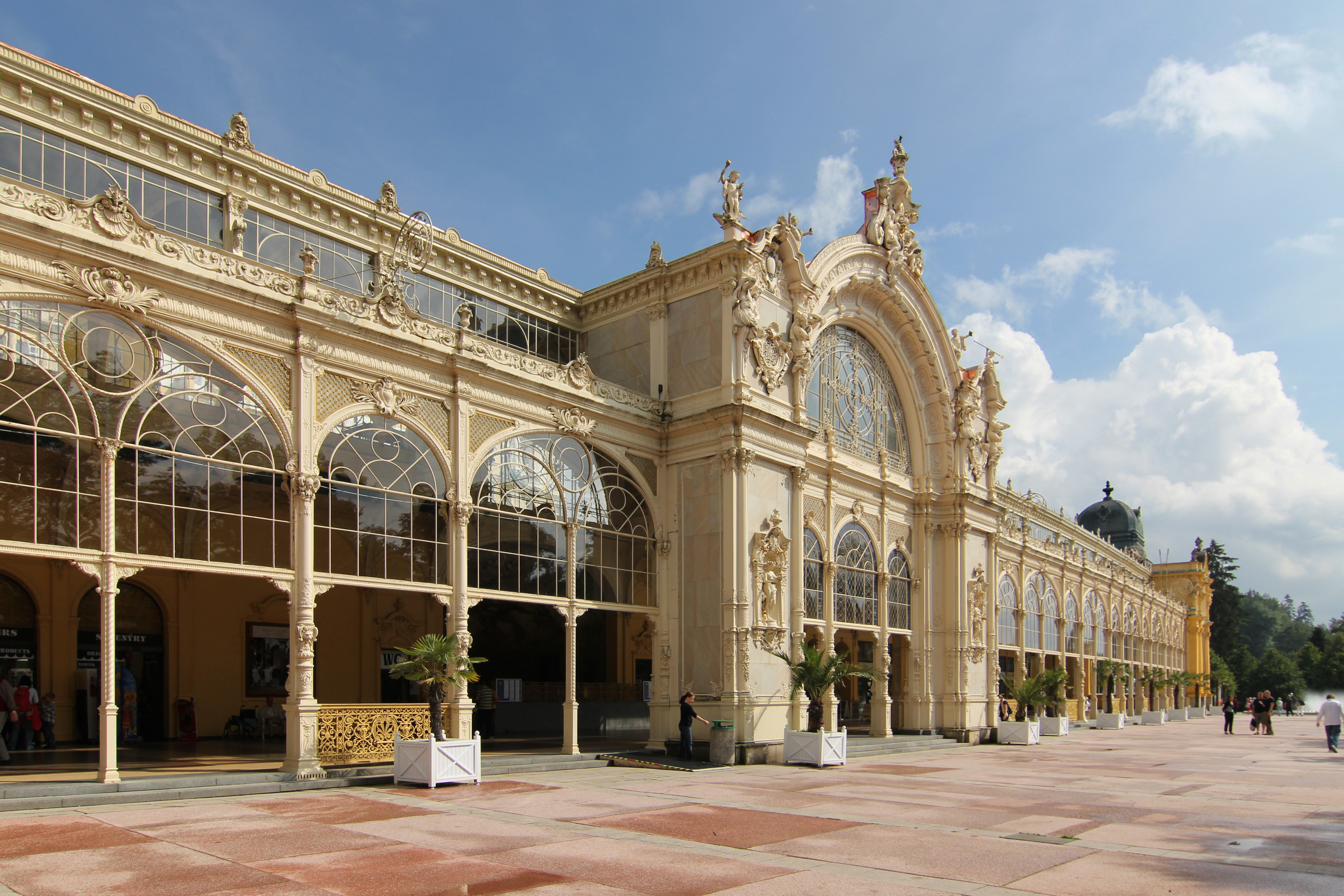
Spa colonnade in Mariánské Lázně, Czech Republic, 1889

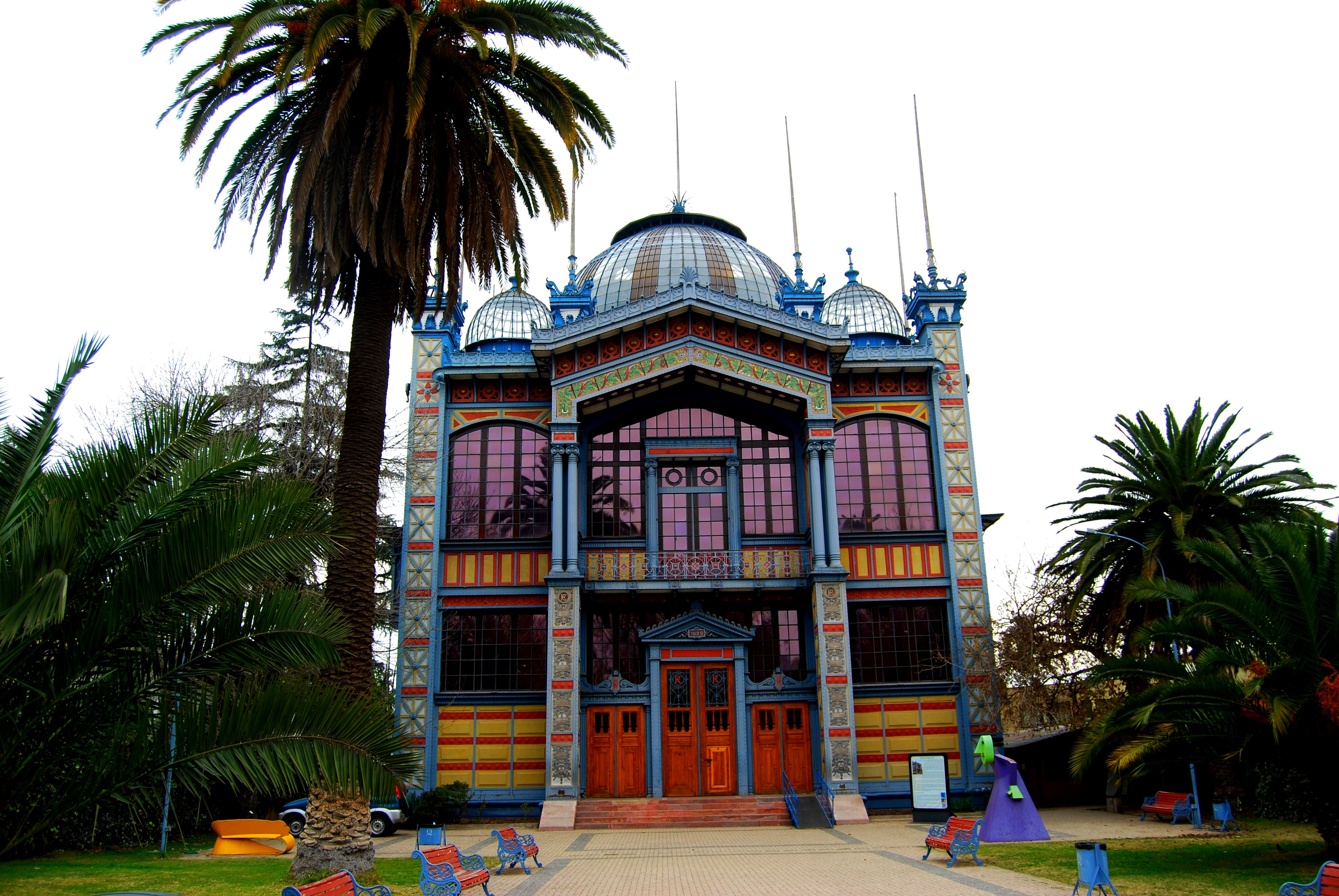
Paris Pavilion, Santiago, Chile, 1889

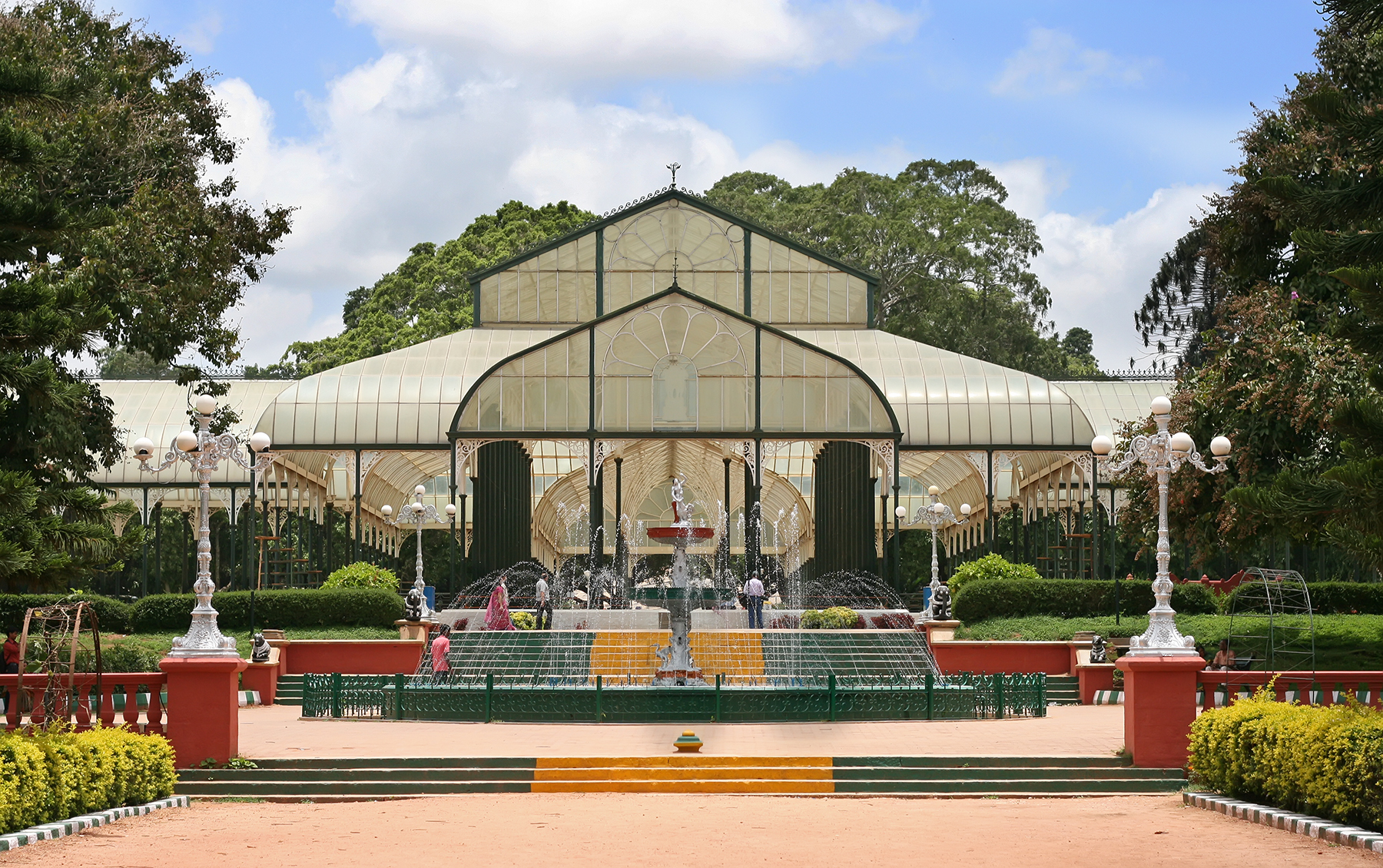
Lalbagh Botanical Garden, India, 1889

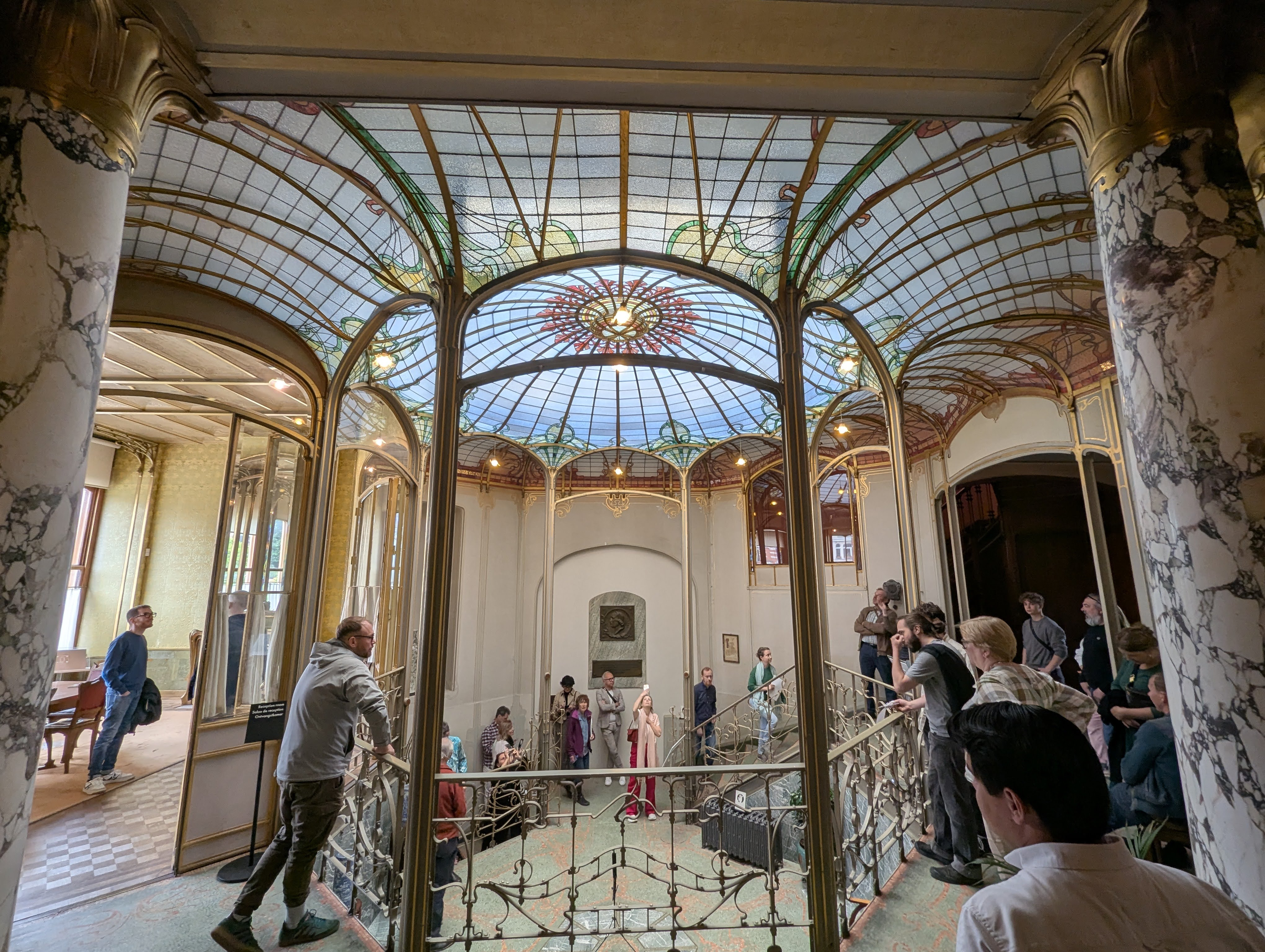
Hotel van Eetvelde, Brussels, designed by Victor Horta, 1895

Grand Palais, Paris, 1900

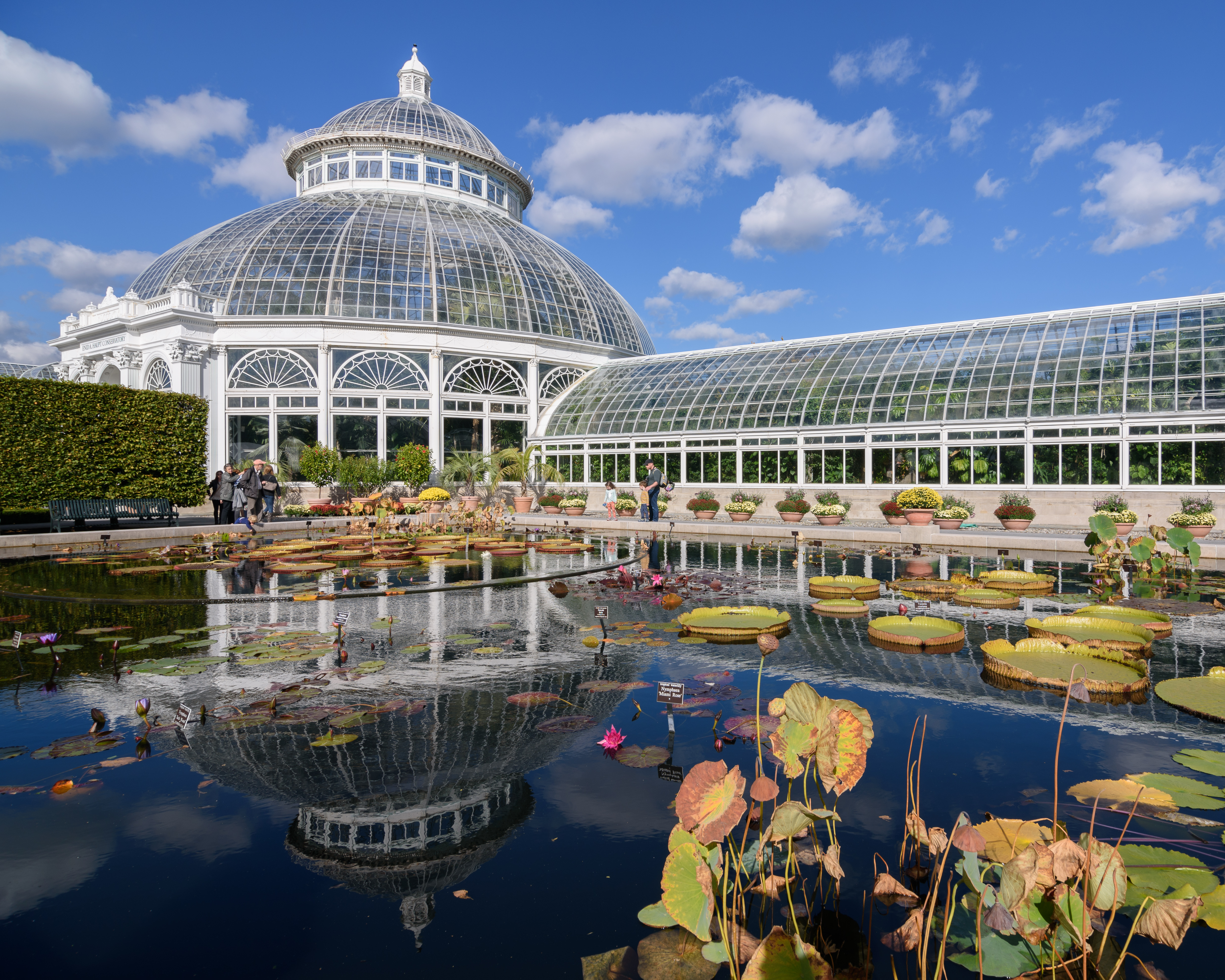
Enid A. Haupt Conservatory at New York Botanical Garden, 1902

The lobby of the Rookery Building, Chicago, was remodeled by Frank Lloyd Wright in 1905

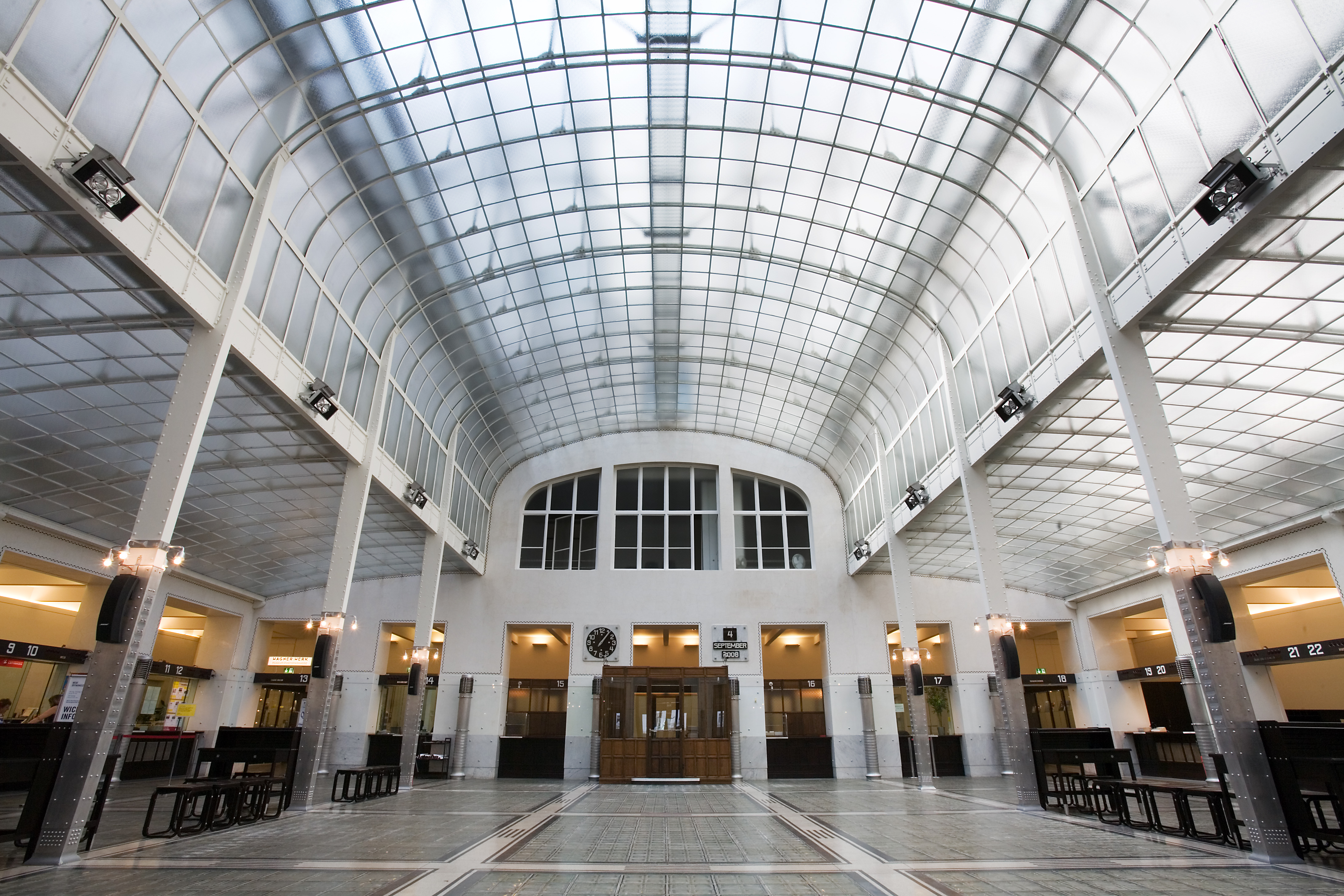
Austrian Postal Savings Bank, Viena, 1906

Galeries Lafayette Haussmann, Paris, 1912

Párizsi Udvar Hotel, Budapest, 1913

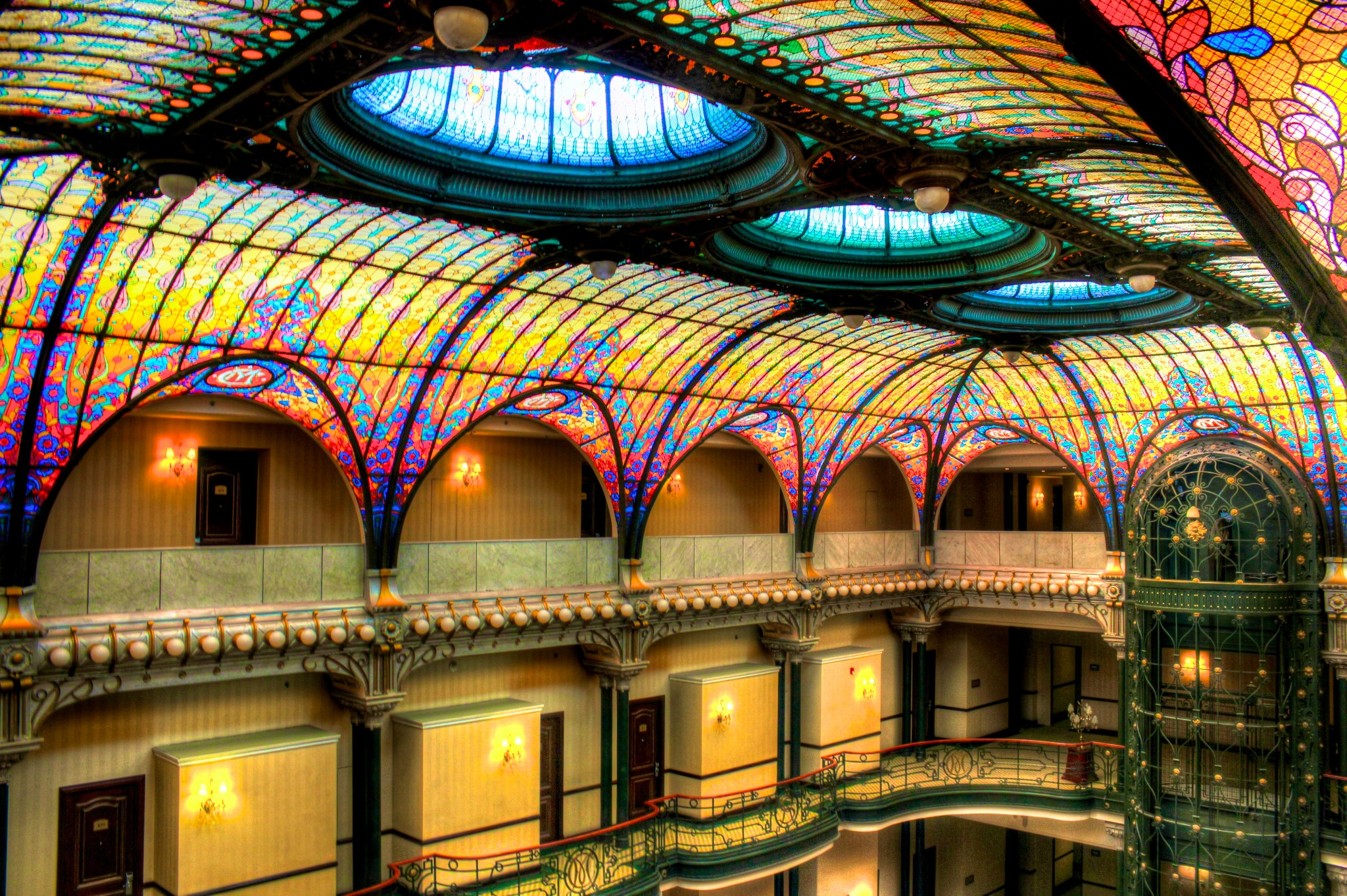
Large Tiffany stained-glass window at the Gran Hotel Ciudad de México, 1918

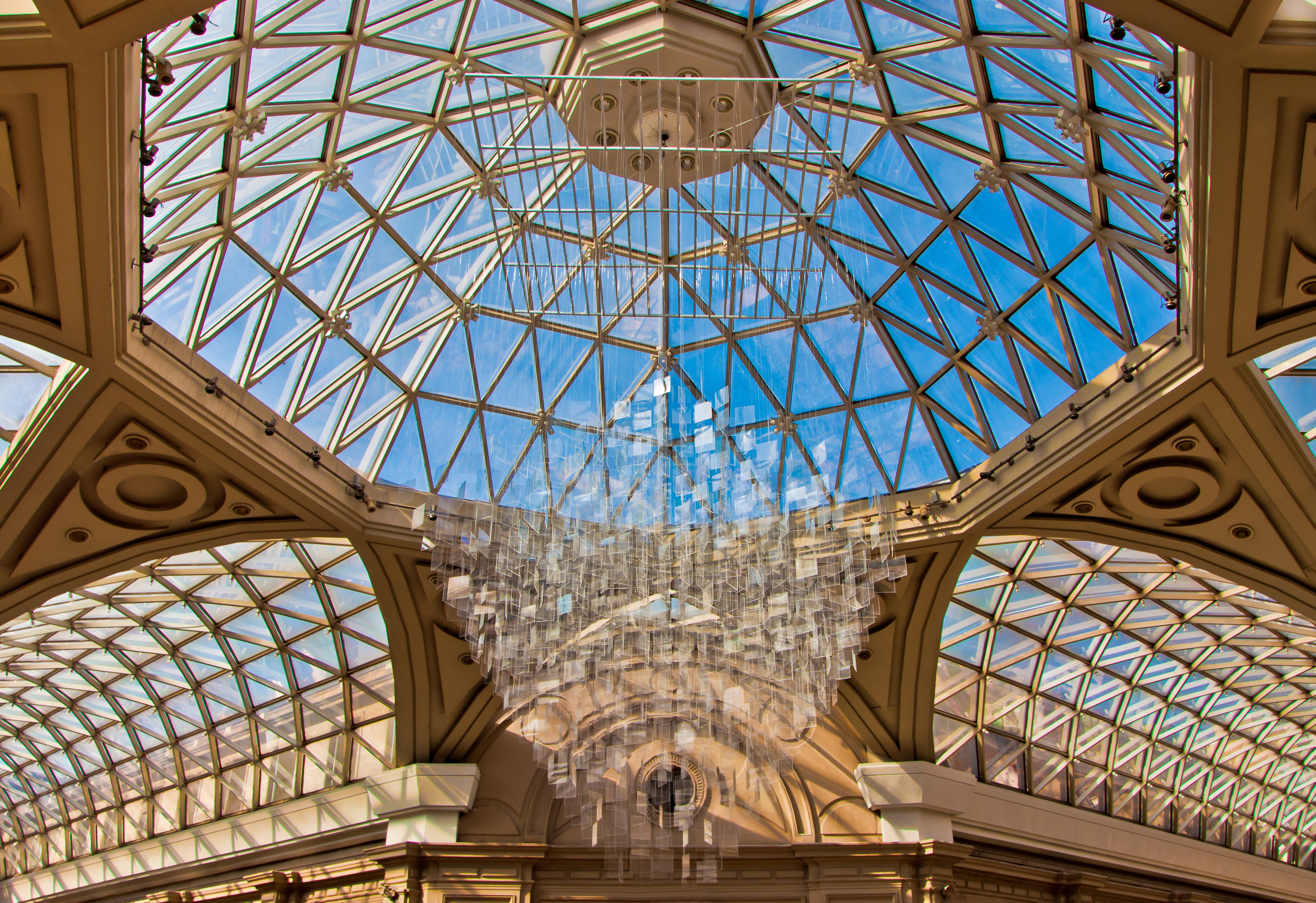
Galerias Pacífico, Argentina, 1946

Glass House, Connecticut, USA, designed by Philip Johnson, 1950

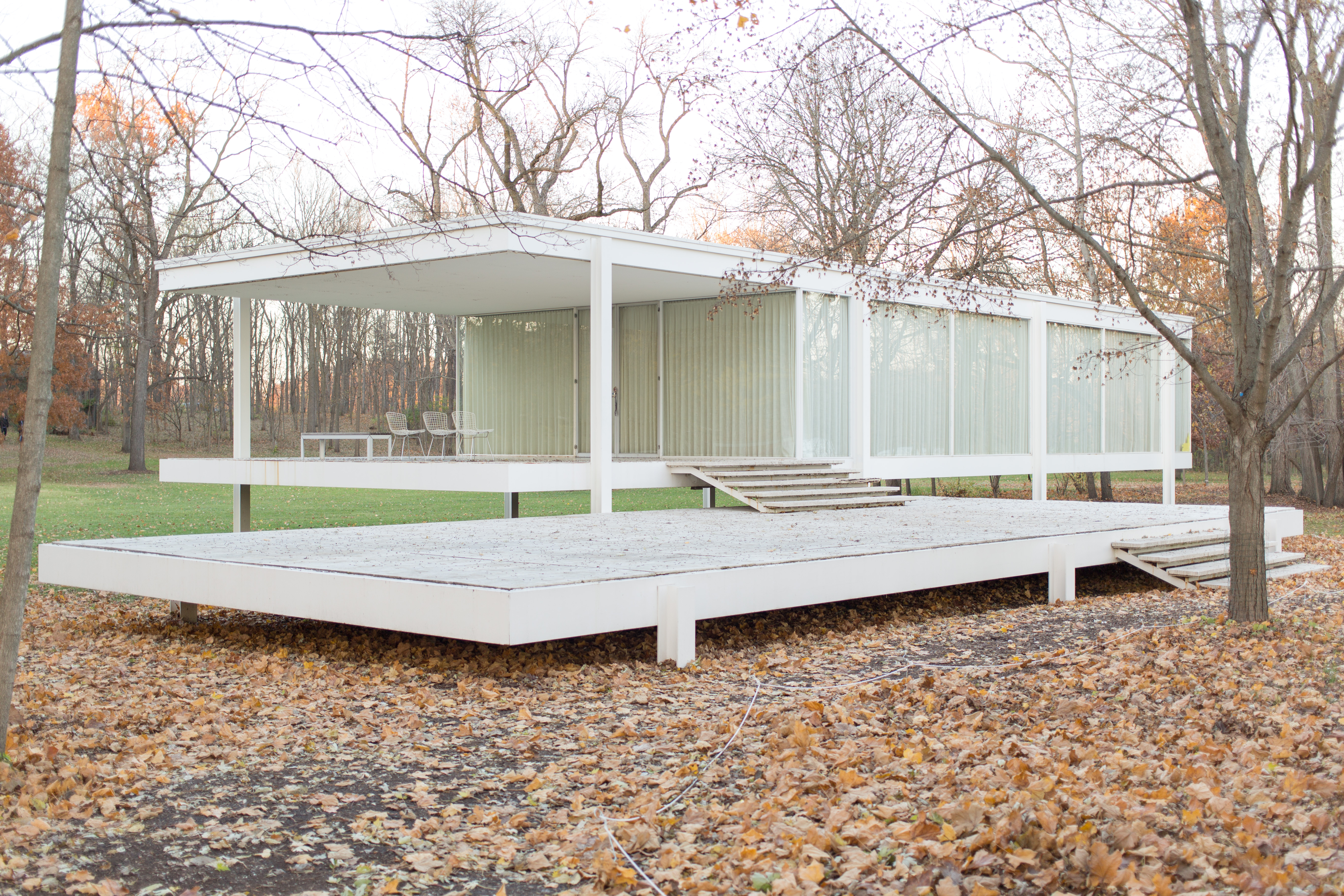
Farnsworth House, Illinois, USA, designed by Ludwig Mies van der Rohe, 1951

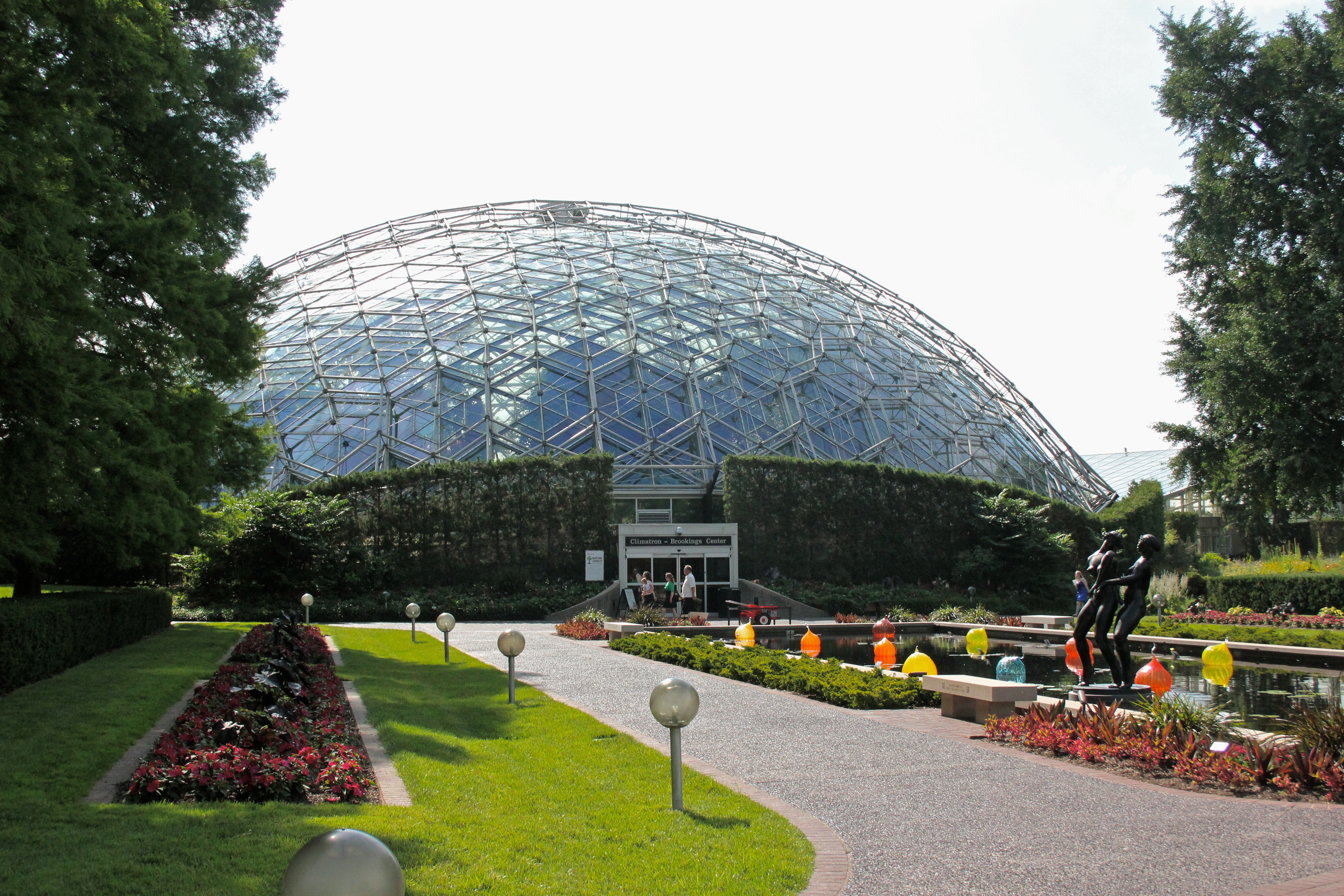
Climatron, Missouri, USA, 1960

Mitchell Park Horticultural Conservatory, Wisconsin, USA, 1964

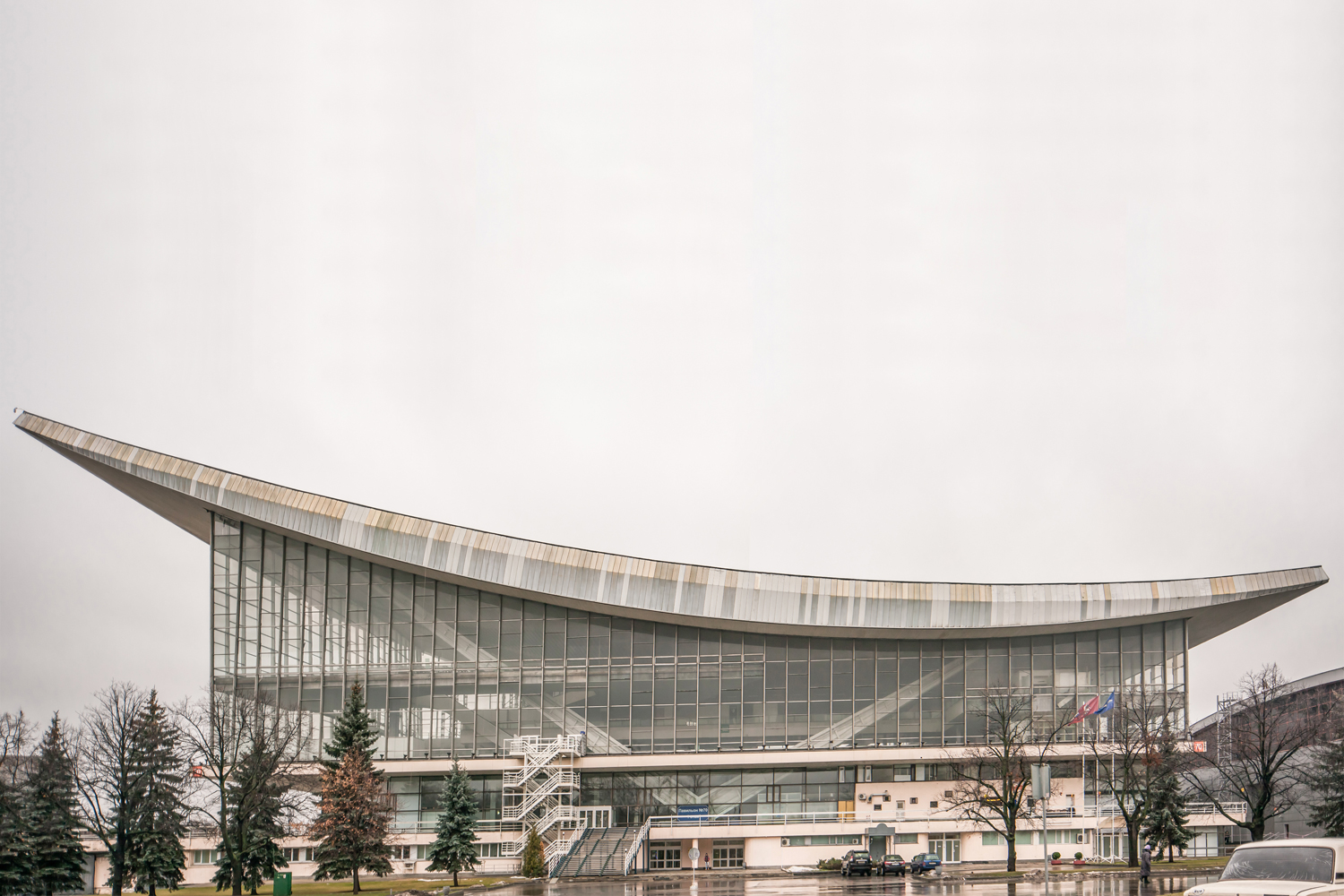
Moscow Pavilion, Russia, 1967

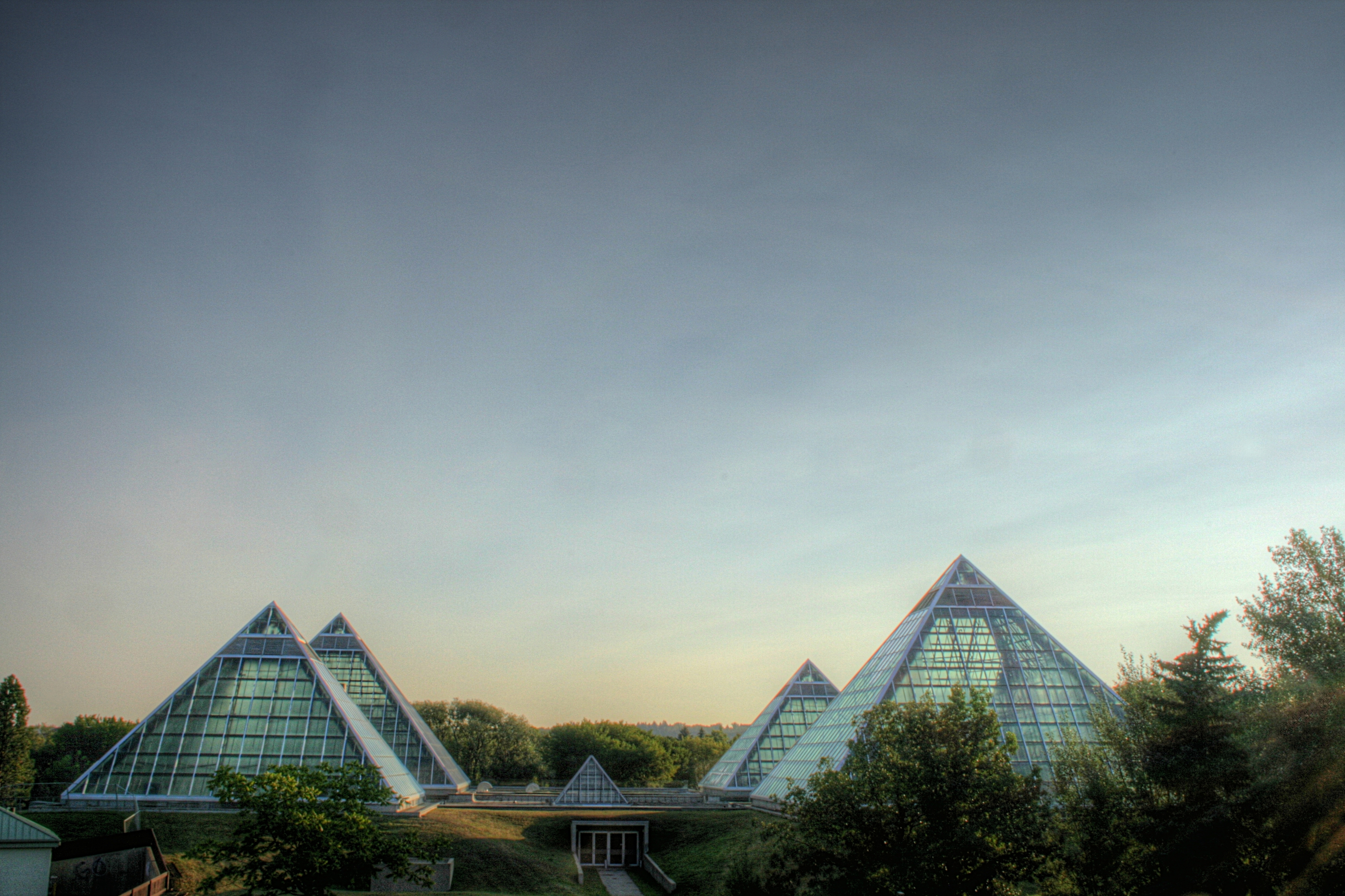
Muttart Conservatory, Alberta, Canada, 1976

Louvre Pyramid, Paris, 1989

Botanical Garden of Curitiba, Brazil, 1991

Biosphere 2 greenhouse complex, Arizona, USA, 1991

Dancing House, Prague, 1996

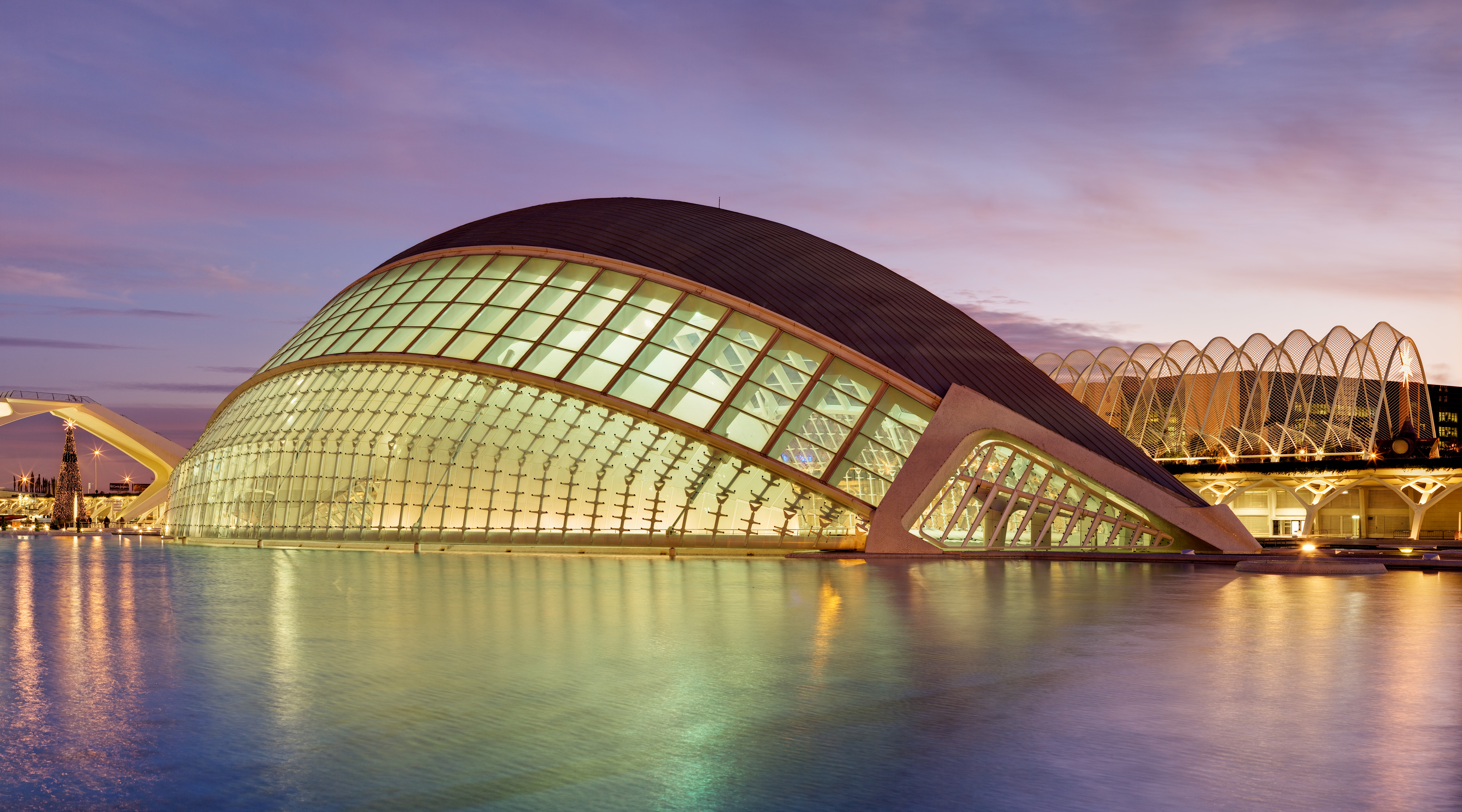
El Hemisfèric, Valencia, Spain, designed by Santiago Calatrava, 1998

Reichstag Dome, Berlin, 1999

Shanghai International Convention Center, China, 1999

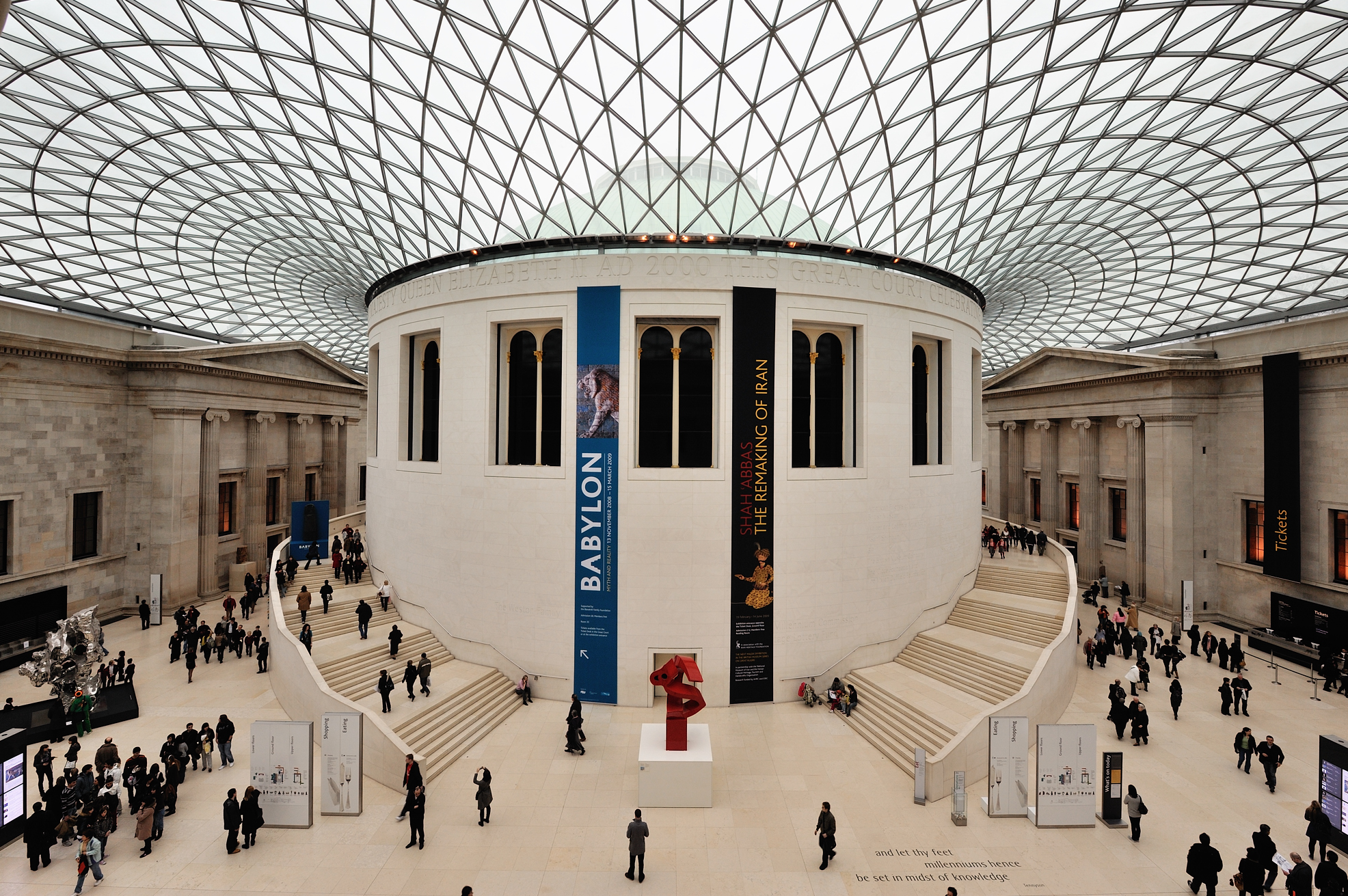
Queen Elizabeth II Great Court of British Museum, London, 2000

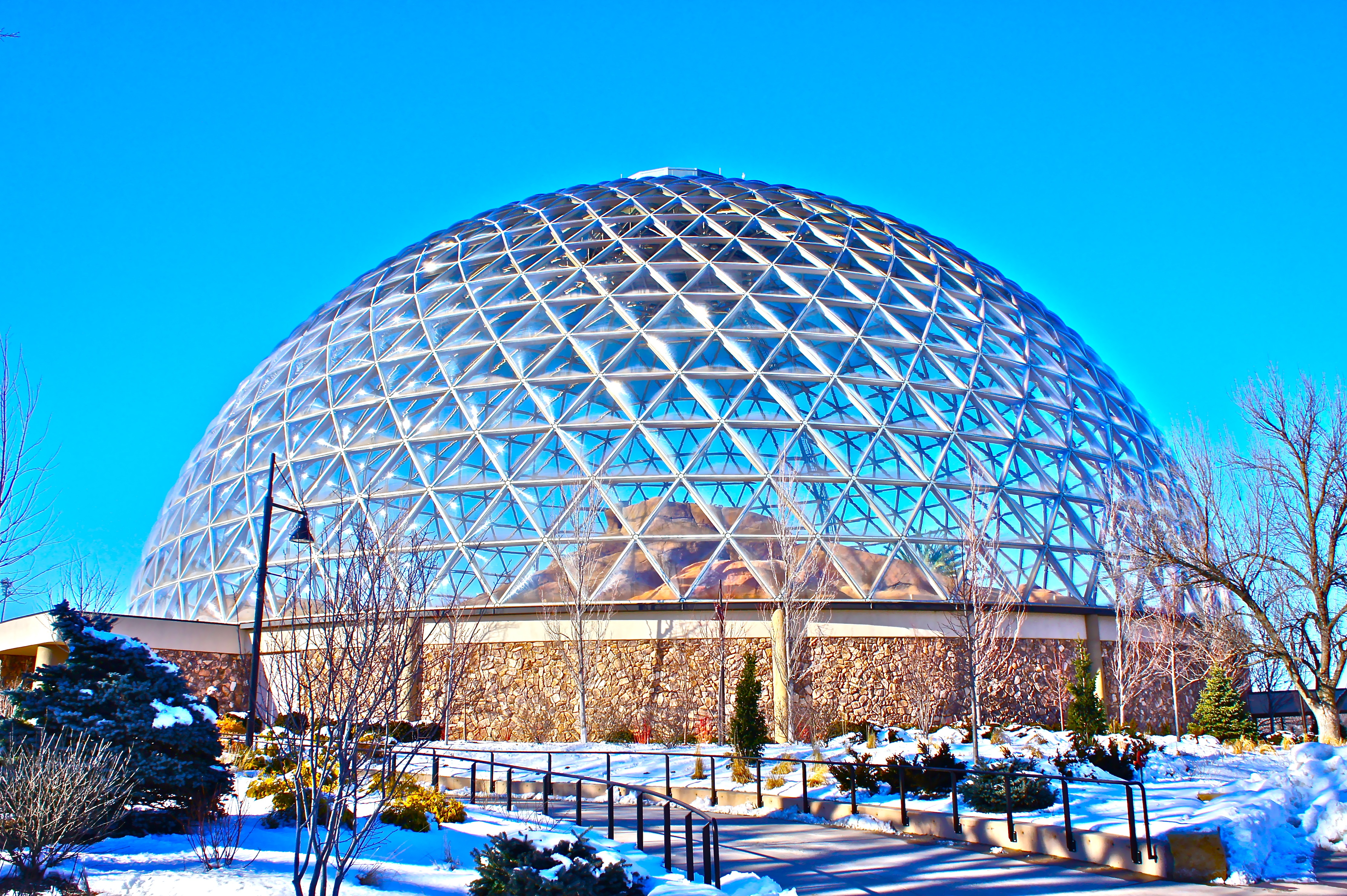
Desert Dome at Omaha's Henry Doorly Zoo, USA, 2002

The Glasshouse, Gateshead, England, 2004

National Library of Belarus, Minsk, 2006

Osakidetza Headquarters, Bilbao, Spain, 2008

Gardens by the Bay, Singapore, 2012

Emporia Shopping Center, Malmö, Sweden, 2012

Seoul City Hall, South Korea, 2012

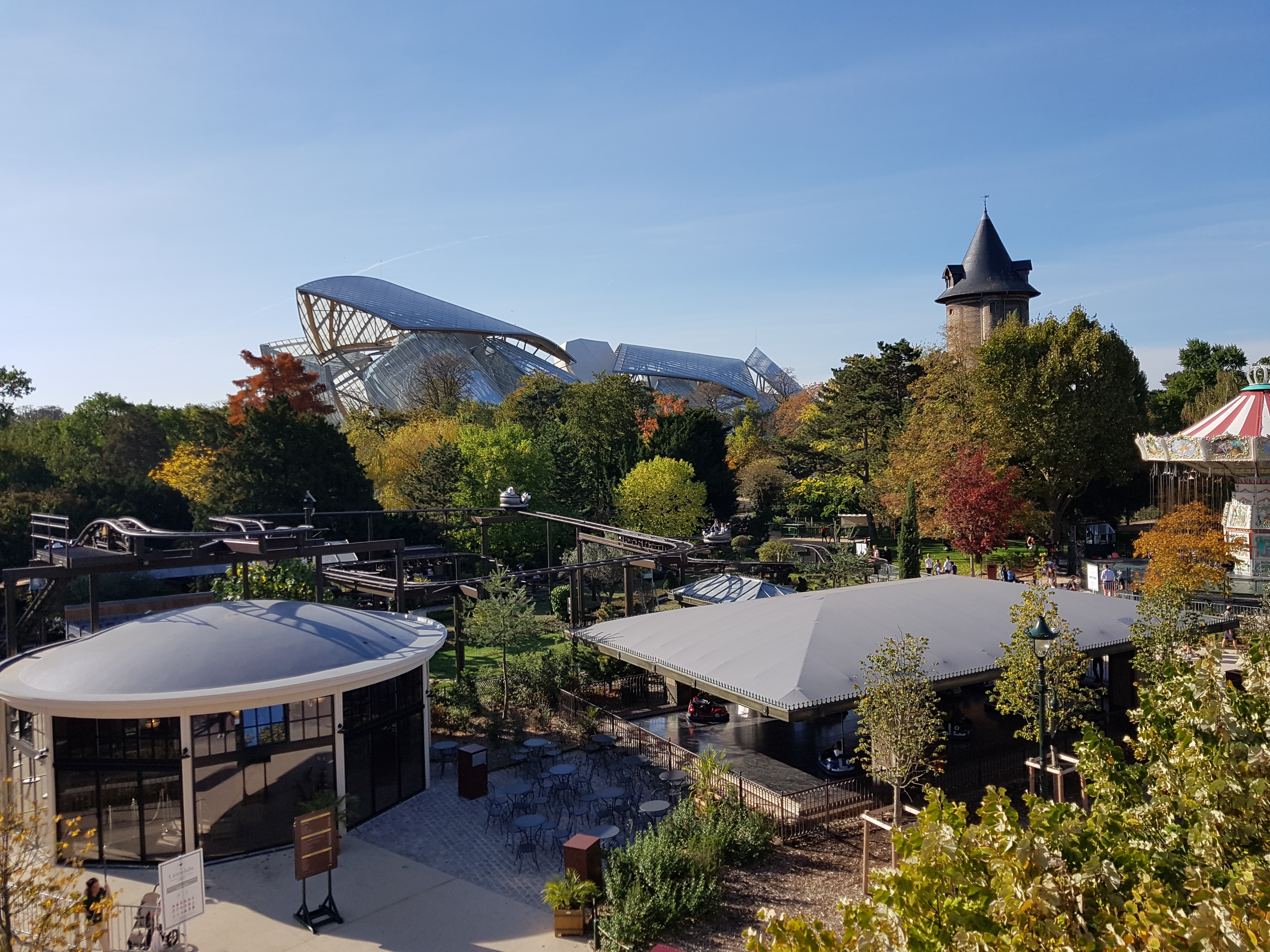
Louis Vuitton Foundation, Paris, designed by Frank Gehry, 2014

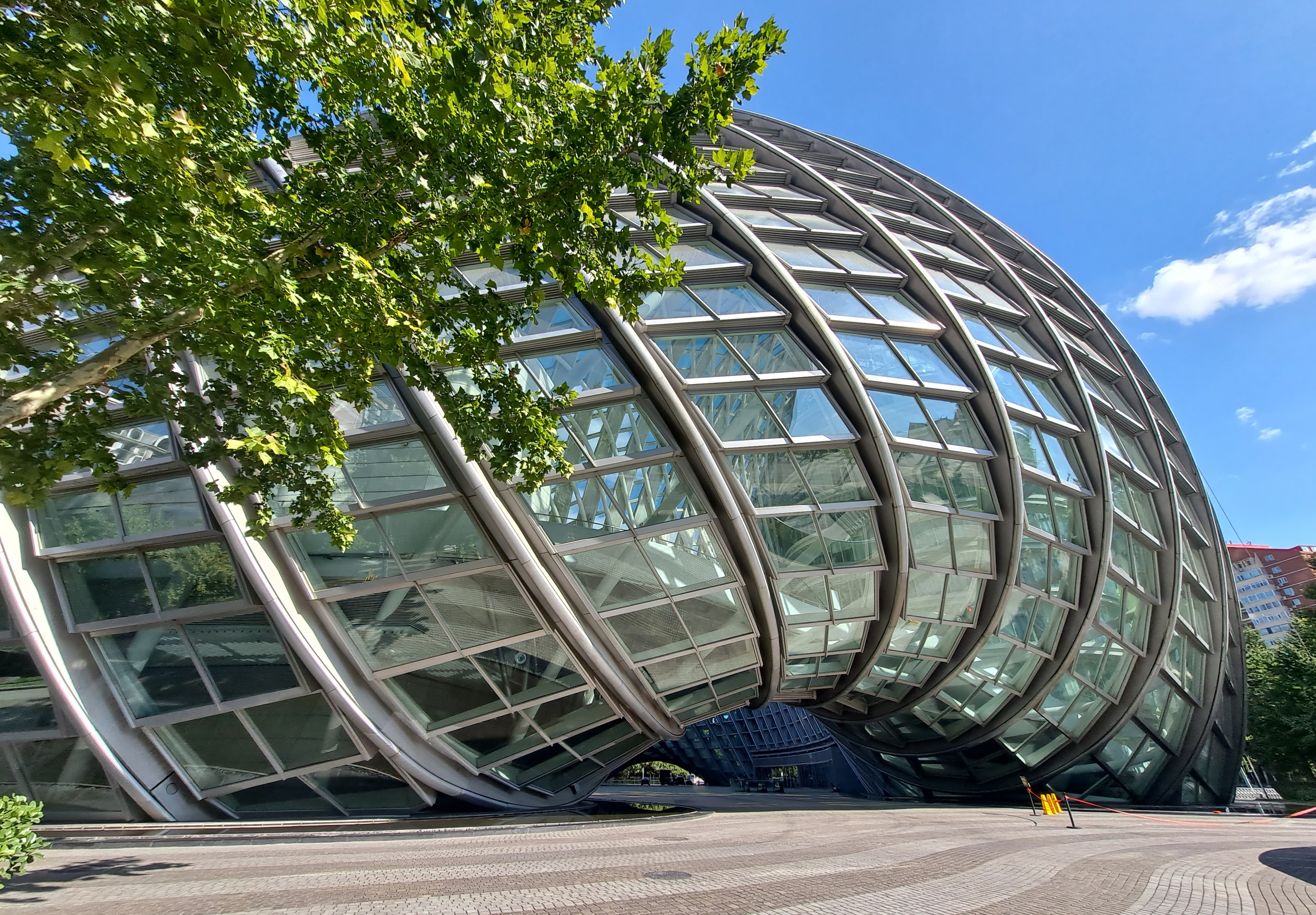
Phoenix Center, Beijing, 2014

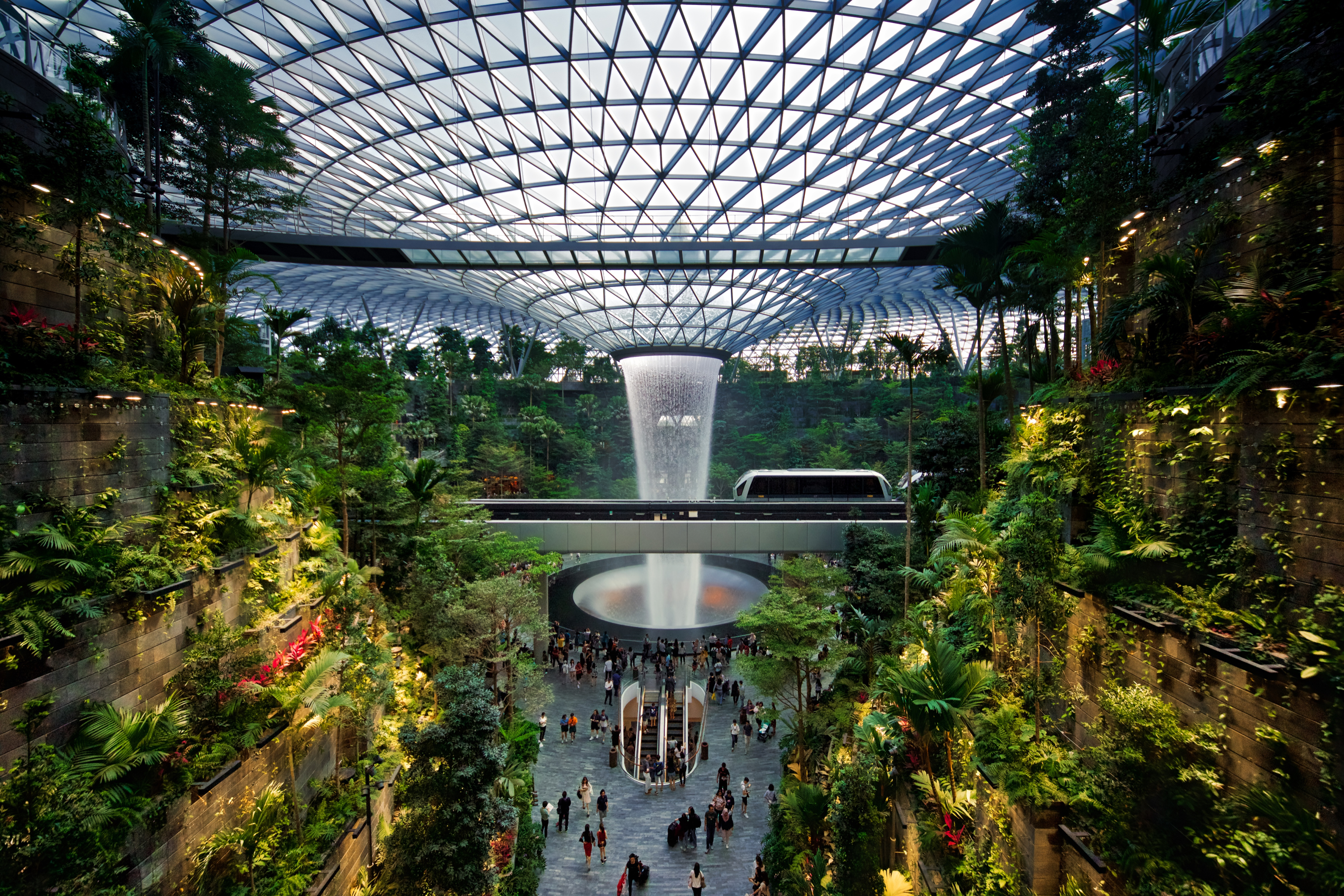
Jewel Changi Airport, Singapore, 2019

The Orchard at Hamad International Airport, Qatar, 2022

Glasshouse Theatre, Queensland, Australia, 2026
