= Listed buildings in Harrogate (Harlow Moor Ward) =

Harlow Moor is a ward in the town of Harrogate, North Yorkshire, England. It contains 23 listed buildings that are recorded in the National Heritage List for England. Of these, one is listed at Grade I, the highest of the three grades, one is at Grade II*, the middle grade, and the others are at Grade II, the lowest grade. The ward is to the west of the centre of the town, containing part of Low Harrowgate, and the area of Harlow Hill. It is mainly residential, with remnants of the town's history as a spa town. Within the ward are the Valley Gardens and RHS Garden Harlow Carr, both of which contain listed buildings. The other listed buildings include houses, cottages and associated structures, hotels, bridges, churches, an observation tower, a water tower, a set of lamp posts, and a pavilion and colonnade.

== Key ==
| Grade | Criteria |
|---|---|
| I | Buildings of exceptional interest, sometimes considered to be internationally important |
| II* | Particularly important buildings of more than special interest |
| II | Buildings of national importance and special interest |

== Buildings ==
| Name and location | Photograph | Date | Notes | Grade |
|---|---|---|---|---|
| Old Swan Hotel; 53.99557°N 1.54774°W | | c.1700 | The hotel was rebuilt in about 1820 and further extended in 1878. It is in gritstone with a bracketed eaves cornice and a slate mansard roof. There are three storeys and attics, a projecting centre of three bays, five-bay flanking wings, and a further four bays at the west end. In the centre is a rendered portico with a bracketed cornice. The windows are recessed sashes, and in the attics are gabled dormers. | II |
| 10 Promenade Square; 53.99390°N 1.54779°W | | Early 18th century | A pair of cottages combined into one house, it is in gritstone, and has eaves with carved bargeboards, and a Welsh slate roof with kneelers. There are two storeys and three bays. In the centre is a doorway and a gabled hood with decorative bargeboards, flanked by bow windows, and the upper floor contains two-light mullioned windows. | II |
| Irongate Bridge; 53.99521°N 1.56608°W | | 18th century | A packhorse bridge crossing Oak Beck in the park of Oakdale Manor. It is in gritstone and consists of a single segmental arch with voussoirs, abutments and a ramped approach. The bridge is paved with cobble, and is without parapets. | II |
| Oakdale Bridge; 53.99150°N 1.57237°W | | 18th century | The bridge carries Penny Pot Lane over the Oak Beck. It is in stone and consists of two arches with voussoirs and cutwaters. The parapets have plain copings. | II |
| 56A Cold Bath Road, stables and outbuildings 53.98674°N 1.55071°W | — | c. 1800 | The building is in stone, and has a slate roof with stone coped gables. There are two storeys, and on the north front are ten irregular openings, which include a flat-headed entrance archway, doorways and sash windows. Included are a coach house with taking-in doors, and an external stone staircase. | II |
| 60 Cold Bath Road; 53.98665°N 1.55044°W | | c. 1800 | The house is in stone, and has a slate roof with coped gables and kneelers. There are three storeys and three bays. The central round-headed doorway has plain pilaster jambs, a fanlight and a moulded keystone. It is flanked by two-storey canted bay windows with flat lead roofs, and the other windows are sashes. | II |
| Paris Pavilion; 53.98665°N 1.55090°W | — | c. 1800 | A bath house, later a private house, in stone with a slate roof, coped gables and kneelers. There are three storeys and three bays. The central doorway has a fanlight, and the windows are sashes. On the south front is an external staircase and terrace. | II |
| Wash house southwest of Paris Pavilion; 53.98655°N 1.55107°W | — | c. 1800 | The wash house is in stone with a slate roof and stone coped gables and kneelers. There is a single storey, and in the north front is a single doorway. | II |
| 7 Promenade Square; 53.99389°N 1.54808°W | — | Late 18th to early 19th century | The house is in gritstone with the gable pebbledashed, a cornice over the ground floor, and a Welsh slate roof with a carved bargeboard. There are two storeys and two bays. The front is bowed, and has three-light windows and a modern porch. | II |
| 8 and 9 Promenade Square; 53.99389°N 1.54794°W | | Late 18th to early 19th century | Two cottages in gritstone with a Welsh slate roof. The left cottage had a third storey added in the 20th century. In the left cottage is a three-storey rendered bow window with sashes. To the right is a round-arched doorway, and in the top floor is a round-arched window. The right cottage has a single-storey bow window, and to the right is a doorway with a gabled canopy. | II |
| Promenade Court; 53.99381°N 1.54810°W | — | Late 18th to early 19th century | A house later divided into two, in gritstone with sill bands, a bracketed cornice and gutter, and a stone slate roof. There are three storeys and basements, and three bays. In the centre, steps lead up to a pair of round-arched Doric doorways with fanlights, and above them are recessed sash windows. The outer bays contain three-storey segmental bow windows. In front of the basement areas are wrought iron railings. | II |
| 11 Promenade Square; 53.99393°N 1.54769°W | | Early 19th century | The house is in gritstone, and has eaves with a carved bargeboard, and a Welsh slate roof with a gable and kneelers. There are two storeys and a basement, and one bay. On the left, steps lead up to a doorway with a bracketed canopy. To the right is a two-storey splayed bay window with a cornice, above which is a sash window. In the basement is a doorway with a plain surround, and the basement area and steps have cast iron railings. | II |
| Harlow Hill Tower; 53.98296°N 1.56232°W | | 1829 | Built as an observation tower, it is in stone, with a square plan, and is 90 feet (27 m) high. On the top is a modern domed observatory roof. Adjacent is a two-storey entrance extension with a tile roof, and steps leading up to an upper floor doorway. | II |
| Harrogate Arms Hotel; 53.98341°N 1.57611°W | | c. 1844 | The hotel is in gritstone, with string courses, and a slate roof with coped gables and finials. There are two storeys and three bays, the outer bays projecting and gabled. In the centre is a gabled porch, and an arched doorway with a fanlight and a hood mould. The outer bays contain splayed bay windows with embattled parapets. In the upper floor are recessed mullioned and transomed windows with chamfered surrounds and hood moulds, containing casements, and in the gables are blind lancets. | II |
| Offices of the Northern Horticultural Society; 53.98249°N 1.57607°W | | c. 1844 | Originally the Harlow Car Sulphur Spa, later used as offices in RHS Garden Harlow Carr. The building is in gritstone with projecting eaves and a hipped slate roof. There is one storey and six bays. The outer bays contain doorways, and in the inner bays are recessed windows with chamfered surrounds, two or three lights and hood moulds. | II |
| Four lamp posts, Promenade Square; 53.99377°N 1.54746°W | | 1848 | The lamp posts are in cast iron, and each has a decorated square base, and a tapering, reeded column topped by a palmette-decorated bell capital. Above this are a pair of small lion heads flanked by ornately shaped ladder rests. Three of the lamp posts have a modern lantern, and one has a swan neck fitting. | II |
| 16 to 30 Swan Road and 12 Promenade Square; 53.99406°N 1.54744°W | | Mid 19th century | A terrace of nine houses, a shop and a hotel in gritstone, with aves cornices, and a hipped Welsh slate roof. There are two storeys, basements and attics, and each building has three bays. The doorways have pilasters, a fanlight, a cornice and a pediment, the windows are recessed sashes, and in the attics are dormers. The terrace contains a carriage entrance with block voussoirs and a semi-elliptical arch, the shops have wrought iron railings, and the hotel has a basemen porch and a bay window. | II |
| Magnesia Well Building; 53.99102°N 1.55235°W | | 1858 | The building, in Valley Gardens, is in gritstone with rusticated block quoins, and a fishtail slate roof with gables and decorative bargeboards. There is a single storey and two bays, and the building is in Gothic style. The doorway and windows have pointed arches and hood moulds, and in the gable is a lunette with a hood mould. | II |
| Church of All Saints, Harlow Hill; 53.98058°N 1.56507°W | | 1870–71 | The church was designed by I.T. Shutt and A.H. Thompson. It is in rusticated gritstone with Westmorland slate roofs, and consists of a nave, a south porch, north and south transepts, a chancel with an apse, a south vestry and a north organ chamber, and a south bell tower. The tower is circular with three stages, and contains lancet windows and small quatrefoils. The bell openings are louvred lancets, and at the top is a round spire. | II |
| Harlow Hill Water Tower; 53.98310°N 1.56176°W | | c. 1902 | The water tower is in rusticated gritstone, and consists of a three-storey circular tower on an octagonal podium with a bracketed cornice. The podium contains arched recesses and a doorway. In the lower two storeys of the tower are Tuscan pilasters carrying a modified cornice, and pedimented windows in alternate bays. On the top is a metal water tank with a decorative corona, and a small central octagonal lantern with an ogee roof. On the west side of the podium is a date plaque in a recess. | II |
| St Wilfrid's Church; 53.99527°N 1.55288°W | | 1904–08 | The church was designed by Temple Moore, in 1926–28 the transept ends were added in 1926–28 and supervised by Leslie Moore, who also designed the Lady chapel, with was added in 1935. The church is built in Tadcaster limestone with roofs of tile and slate. It has a cruciform plan, consisting of a nave with a clerestory, north and south aisles, a north transept with an embattled entrance porch and an organ chamber above, a south transept with an apse, a chancel with a clerestory, an octagonal Lady chapel at the east end with an ambulatory, and a tower at the crossing with an embattled parapet and a pyramidal roof. | I |
| St Mary's Church, Harrogate; 53.98800°N 1.55168°W | | 1915–16 | The church, which was designed by Walter Tapper, is in Bath stone with tile roofs. It has a cruciform plan, consisting of a nave with a clerestory, north and south aisles, a south porch, north and south transepts, a chancel with side chapels, and a tower at the crossing. The tower has three stages, an embattled stair turret rising higher than the tower, a clock face on the south side, a plain parapet, and a pyramidal roof. | II* |
| Sun Pavilion and Sun Colonnade; 53.99222°N 1.55133°W | | 1933 | The building, on the north side of Valley Gardens, is in red brick with concrete dressings imitating sandstone. It consists of a pavilion and a long pergola extending to the east, incorporating smaller pavilions. The main pavilion has a double-height octagonal space with a dome, flanked by single-storey service projections. The main front has three bays, and a large pediment with an entablature. The pergola is a covered promenade with concrete Tuscan columns. The colonnade is punctuated by two smaller double-height semi-octagonal pavilions, and at the eastern end is a rectangular pavilion. | II |
