= Melikshah Soyturk =

Turkish modern topographic painter

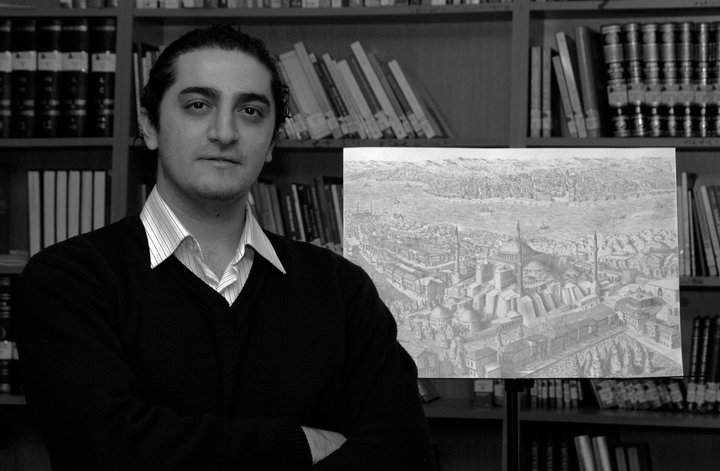

Melikshah Soyturk (Turkish: Melikşah Soytürk) (born 18 November 1984) is a modern Turkish topographic painter. He has opened eleven exhibitions in different countries, such as Turkey, United States, Kyrgyzstan and Germany. Among his contemporaries he attracts attention through the individuality and natural quality of his paintings, wherein he uses black pencil only. According to his words, art should help people to become closer to God and paintings should encourage society to live in kindness and faith.

Soyturk creates works that are not just aesthetically striking but also may be used as a successful source for getting acquainted with Turkey's and Istanbul's history, which are the topics of primary importance, reflected in his paintings.

== Early life ==
Melikshah Soyturk was born on 18 November 1984 in Kastamonu, a province in the Black Sea Region, Turkey. From an early childhood he began to show a flair for drawing and attachment to art. His primary education and secondary education was fulfilled in his hometown, Kastamonu. Not long before graduating from school, Soyturk came up with an idea to represent Turkey and its history. He was 16 when his first exhibition in Kastamonu was opened. Later, the painter entered Kocaeli University where he got the specialization of natural sciences teacher.

Despite having many opportunities, Soyturk decided to listen to his heart and so, he continued on improving his drawing skills. Still, he felt that teaching art and beauty would perfectly suit him and began his teaching career, visiting various schools in colleges and Turkey. Until now the painter is involved in teaching practice and considers giving lectures at universities in the future.

== Career ==
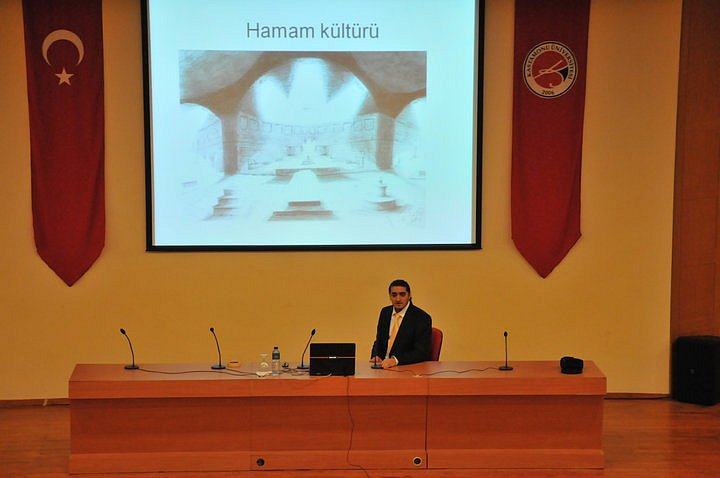

After his first exhibition which is considered to be the first step on the way to success Soyturk continued to open exhibitions and create paintings with his special style. In his works until the present he has taken a stable movement dedicating an absolute majority of the paintings to Istanbul, his beloved city. He gave a presentation with lecture on Turkish culture in the University of Kastamonu and still has been engaged in teaching giving lectures, conferences and lessons in different cities of Turkey. He is also planning to write a seria of books, dedicated to art, that could be used as a manual for those who intend to gain drawing skills.

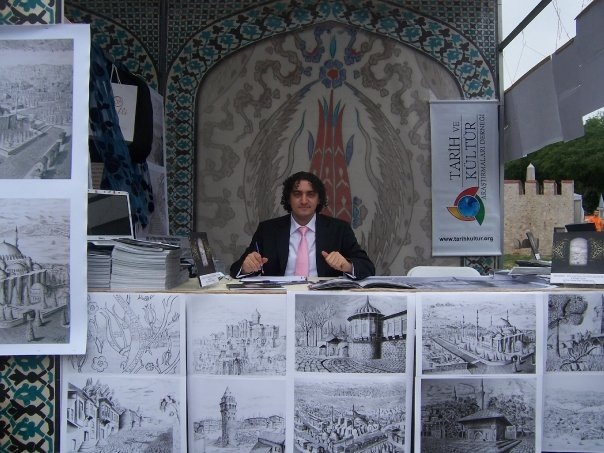

=== Achievements ===
Apart from reaching high level in the branch of art, Melikshah Soyturk has proved his gift by creating sculptures from foiled paper. As a result, he was awarded with a certificate. Besides, with the support of a Turkish researcher Burak Yamaç, Soyturk has published the book that contains the most of his paintings.

In August 2011 Melikshah Soyturk set the record of Turkey, having drawn the longest canvas in the history of the country. His latest picture, "Istanbul of my Dream" (Turkish: Hayalimdeki Istanbul) is 3.5 metre long and demonstrates the world-known places of Istanbul.

=== Exhibitions ===
TBMM Exhibition 1–6 November 2011

Year	Month	Place
2007	March	Izmit
2008	May	İstanbul Üsküdar Kitap Gemisi
2008	June	İstanbul Taksi Metro Exhibition Hall (Sergi Salonu)
2008	October	Kyrgyzstan
2009	2–5 April	Los Angeles, the USA
2009	2–10 May	Capıtol Shopping Centre Üsküdar Altunzade (Capitol Alış Veriş Merkezi)
2009	3–15 August	Kastamonu Municipality
2009	19–26 November	The University of Kastamonu
2010	26 March – 16 April	Germany
2011	1–6 November	TBMM Ankara
2012	26 March – 4 April	Ankara Baro National Gallery (Ankara Barosu Sanat Galerisi)
2012	26 April – 6 May	The National Library of Belarus
