= Harlow Hill Tower =

Tower in Harrogate, North Yorkshire, England

Coordinates: 53°58′59″N 1°33′44″W

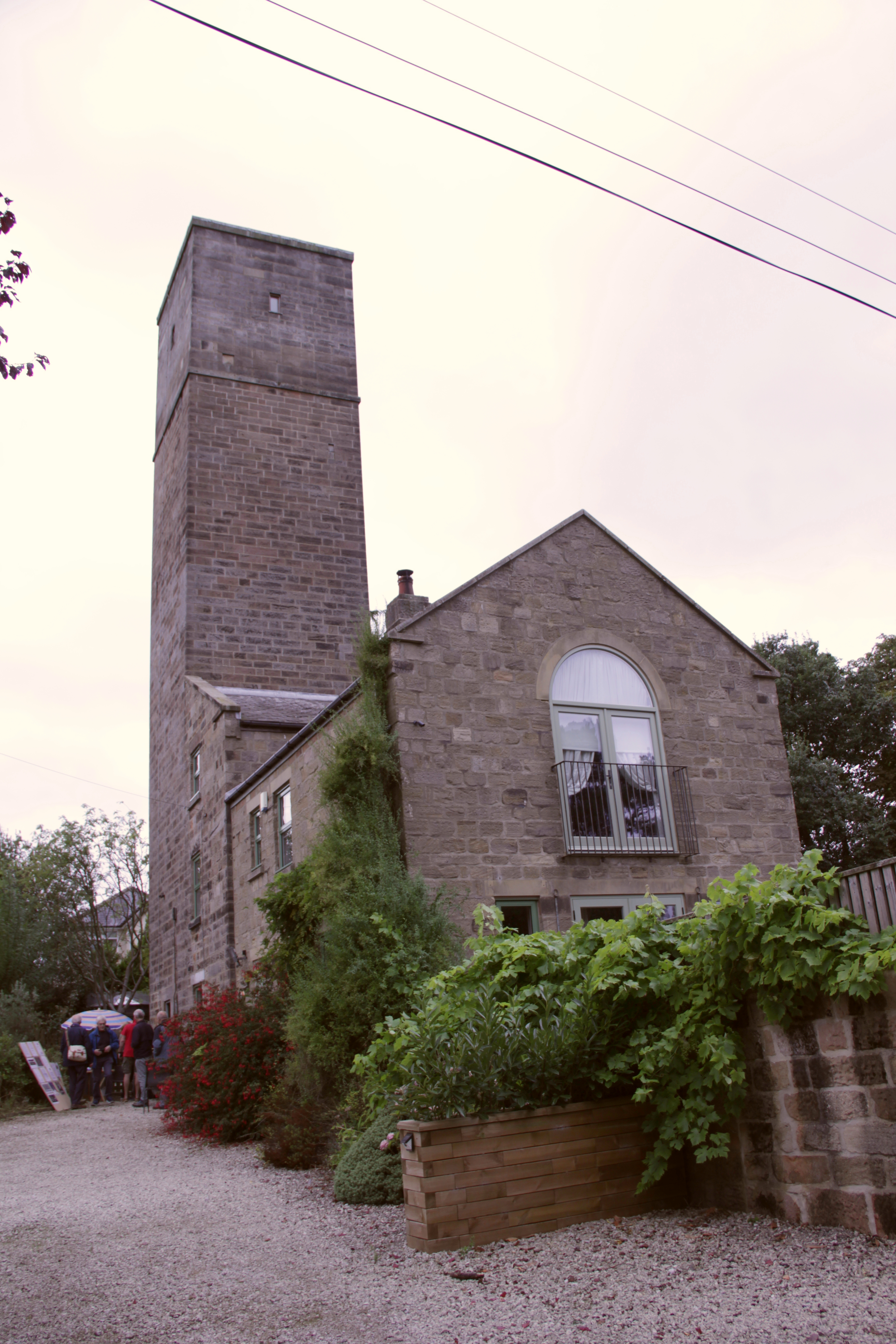
The building, in 2022

Harlow Hill Tower is a historic building in Harrogate, a town in North Yorkshire, in England.

The building was constructed as an observatory in 1829. It is on the edge of Harlow Moor and was built for John Thompson. It was open to the public as a viewing point by 1900, but was only fitted out with a permanent telescope in 1933. In 1998, a Foucault pendulum was installed inside. The building has been grade II listed since 1949.

The tower is built of stone, with a square plan, and is generally said to be 90 feet (27 m) high, although the Harrogate Civic Society states that it has been measured as only 70 feet (21 m) high. On the top is a modern domed observatory roof. It has no decoration other than a lintel inscribed "HARLOW-HILL TOWER 1829". The only windows are small panes on each side near the top. Adjacent is a two-storey entrance extension with a tile roof, and steps leading up to an upper floor doorway.

== See also ==
- Listed buildings in Harrogate (Harlow Moor Ward)
