= List of libraries in Belarus =

This is a list of libraries in Belarus.

== Libraries by region ==
=== Brest ===
- Brest Regional Library named after M. Gorky
- Brest State Technical University Library
- Ostromechev Library

=== Gomel ===
- Gomel Regional Universal Library named after V. I. Lenin

=== Grodno ===
- Grodno Dominican Monastery Library
- Grodno Regional Scientific Library named after Ya. F. Karsky
- Lavrishchev Monastery Library
- Zhirovichi Monastery Library

=== Minsk ===
See also: Centralized system of children's libraries in the city of Minsk (in Belarusian)

- Belarus Agricultural Library, Minsk
- Belarusian State University Library, Minsk
- Budslau Bernardine Monastery Library
- Maxim Tank Belarusian State Pedagogical University Library
- Minsk Regional Library named after A. S. Pushkin
- National Library of Belarus, Minsk
- Presidential Library of the Republic of Belarus, Minsk
- Radziwill Library, Nyasvizh
- Republican Scientific Medical Library, Minsk
- Yakub Kolas Central Scientific Library, National Academy of Sciences, Minsk
- Zhodino Central City Library

=== Mogilev ===
- Bobruisk Central City Library named after M. Gorky
- Mogilev Central District Library
- Mogilev Regional Library named after V. I. Lenin

=== Vitebsk ===
- Hlybokaye Central District Library
- Vitebsk Regional Library

== See also ==
- Belarusian literature
- Mass media in Belarus

in other languages

- Archives of Belarus (in Russian)
- Belarusian Library Association (in Belarusian)
- Copyright in Belarus (in Russian)
- Libraries of Belarus (in Belarusian)
