= Old Swan Hotel =

Hotel in Harrogate, North Yorkshire, England

Coordinates: 53.995840°N 1.547460°W

The Old Swan Hotel

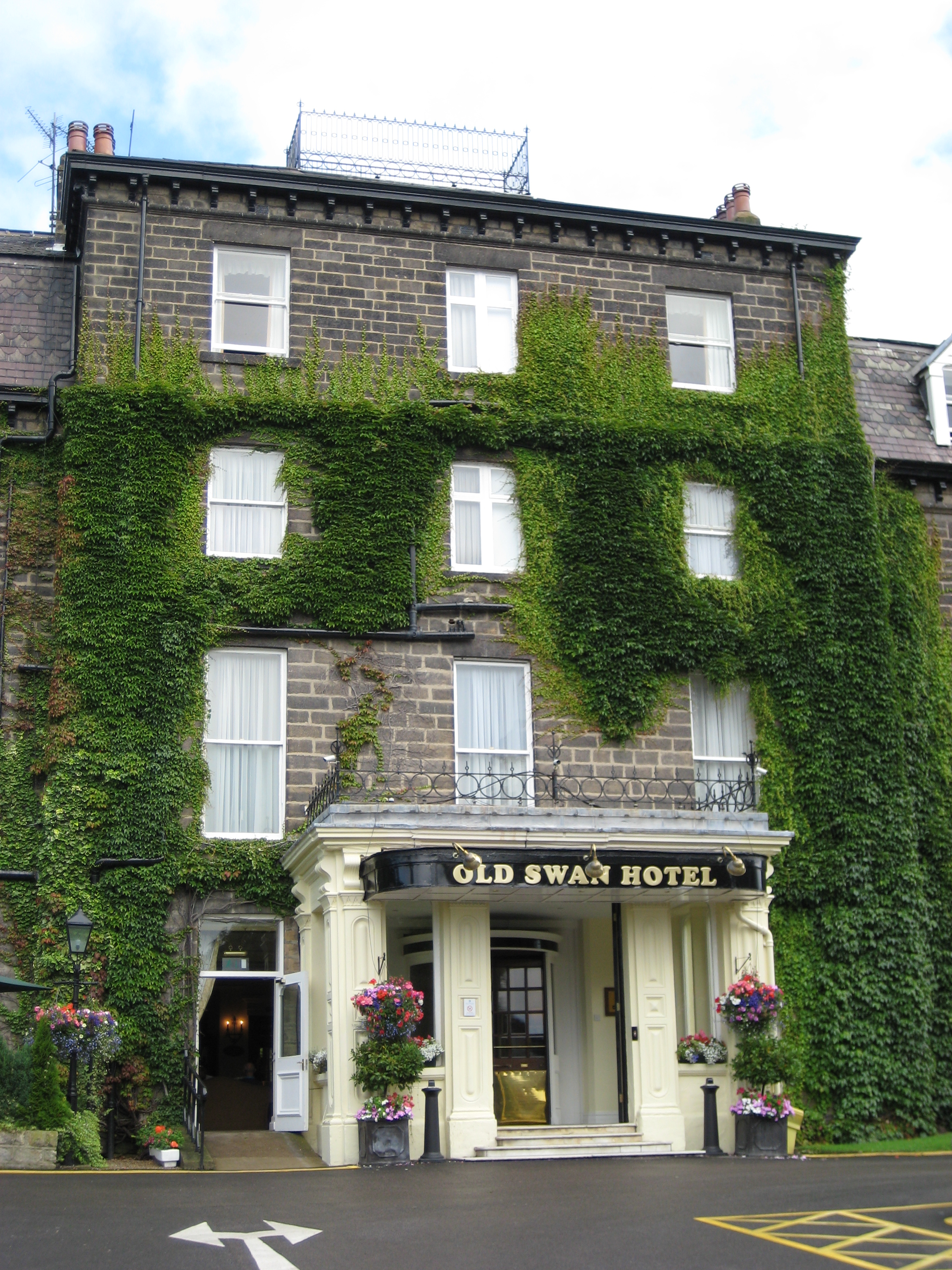
- Main entrance to The Old Swan Hotel
- Interactive map of the The Old Swan Hotel area
- Hotel chain: Classic Lodges

General information
- Location: Swan Road, Harrogate, North Yorkshire, HG1 2SR, United Kingdom
- Opening: 1777; 249 years ago

Other information
- Number of rooms: 136
- Parking: Yes

Website
- The Old Swan Hotel

The Old Swan Hotel in Harrogate, North Yorkshire, England, is part of the Classic Lodges group.

== History ==
Hospitality has been available on the site since at least 1777, originally it was the 'Swan Inn" in Low Harrogate separate from the settlement of High Harrogate.

In the late nineteenth century, it was extensively redeveloped by the "Harrogate Hydropathic Company" as a fashionable spa hotel and included Victorian Turkish baths. Its name was "Swan Hydropathic Hotel" or as the locals called it "The Hydro". It had its own farm on Penny Pot Lane to provide for the kitchens.

It was the first building in Harrogate to have electric light. A vertical steam engine drove a DC generator and also the hotel laundry. The steam engine was re-activated to drive the laundry by Jack Gill of John Redfearn's garage at the hotel in the 1950s until electric motors took over. The fuel was coke from Harrogate Gas Works.

In 1939 the hotel was requisitioned at 48 hours' notice by the Ministry of Aircraft Production and cables were laid to a new telephone exchange in the Library Restaurant. Power cables were laid directly from the hotel to the corporation power station beside Jenny Plain passing in a straight line through every private property on the way. It was attacked by an enemy aircraft in 1943 but only the house at the end of Swan Road by Ripon Road was destroyed.

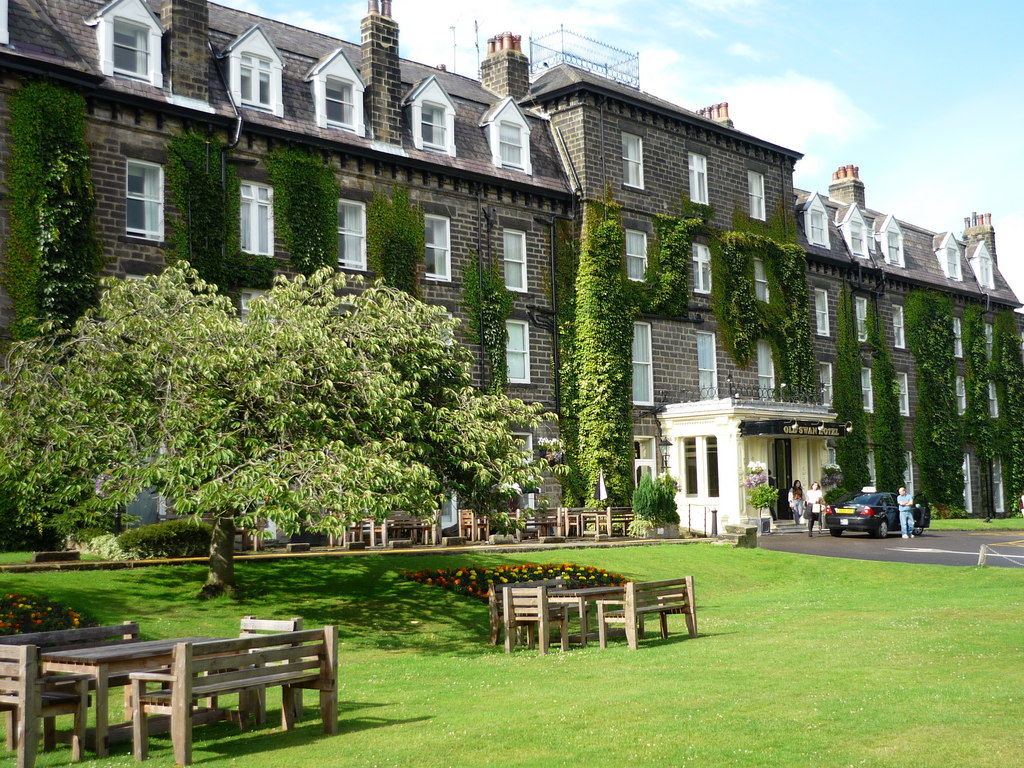
Front facade of The Old Swan Hotel

By the mid-1950s Harrogate had an image problem. The "Bath chair" image of Victorian spa towns was now unfashionable and the Hydro was renamed "The Old Swan Hotel" "famous since 1777".

It was listed in 1975 as a Grade II listed building.

In the early 1980s, the hotel was a focal point of the Harrogate International Festival Of Sound, an annual festival of premium hi-fi equipment.

A refurbishment of The Old Swan Hotel and its 136 rooms was finalised in 2006.

== Agatha Christie's disappearance ==
In December 1926 the author Agatha Christie suddenly disappeared from her home. She was missing for a total of eleven days, during which the police conducted a major manhunt, and there was speculation that she had committed suicide. The disappearance even drew other crime writers Sir Arthur Conan Doyle and Dorothy L. Sayers into the search, Doyle's interest in the occult prompting him to take one of Christie's gloves to a medium. After about ten days (having checked into the Swan Hydropathic Hotel under the assumed name Mrs. Teresa Neele) she was recognised by one of the banjo players at the hotel.

A 1979 film about the event entitled Agatha was filmed at the hotel.

== See also ==
- Listed buildings in Harrogate (Harlow Moor Ward)
- White Swan Hotel, Alnwick, also member of the Classic Lodges group.
