= Valley Gardens, Harrogate =

Park in North Yorkshire, England

Valley Gardens
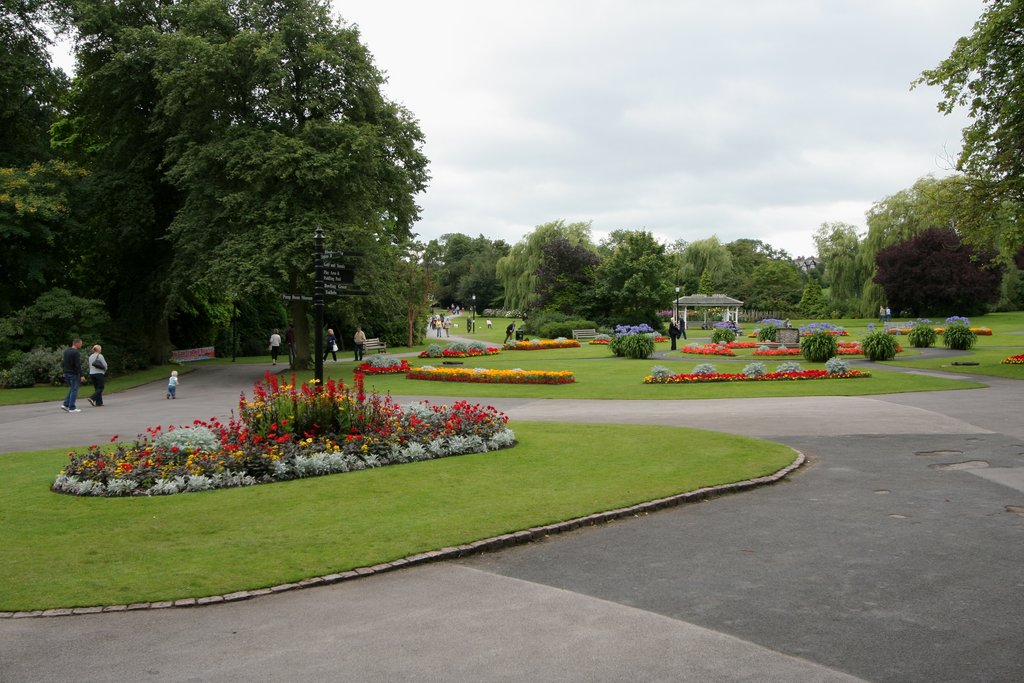
- Interactive map of Valley Gardens
- Location: Harrogate, North Yorkshire
- OS grid: SE290547
- Coordinates: 53.990°N 1.551°W
- Area: 17 acres (6.9 ha)
- Established: 1887
- Website: Friends website

The Valley Gardens is a grade II listed park in Harrogate, North Yorkshire, England. The park, which covers 17 acres (6.9 ha), was laid out in 1887 to commemorate the golden jubilee of Queen Victoria.

== History ==
Due to the proliferation of mineral springs within Harrogate, large swathes of the town were protected from development under an inclosure act, the Forest of Knaresborough Inclosure Act 1770 (10 Geo. 3. c. 94 Pr.). The park was laid out in 1887 to commemorate the Golden Jubilee of Queen Victoria, and extended from Bogs Field in the south, to the pump house at what is now the northern end of the gardens. Bogs Field is the location of the play park and tennis courts in the gardens. Bogs Field is noted for having the largest cluster of mineral springs in England, with 36 wells bringing water that is rich in either sulphur or iron (chalybeate). The mineral wells prompted the building of a hospital to cater for those who it was thought could be cured by the waters. The first hospital opened in 1824, but was replaced by the Royal Bath Hospital in 1889. This closed in 1994 and has since been converted to private dwellings.

In 1911, the first "provincial performance" (i.e. outside the major cities such as London, Birmingham or Glasgow) of Edward Elgar's second symphony was held in the Valley Gardens. One of the walks in the park is named after the composer. The Japanese Gardens were laid out in the 1920s, but by the turn of the 21st century, they were dilapidated. A lottery-funded project to renovate the garden was carried out in 2018. In the late 20th century, with the traditional pastime of coming for the waters at Harrogate beginning to die off, the gardens were host to the Harrogate Spring Flower Show.

In 1974, a long-distance footpath known as the "Harrogate Link" was opened. The path runs from the Royal Pump Museum in Harrogate, through the Valley Gardens and Harlow Carr to meet up with the Dales Way at Ilkley. At the southern end of the park, a wooded area known as "The Pinewoods" forms part of the park and connects it with the Royal Horticultural Society ground at Harlow Carr.

The Valley Gardens are now part of the conservation area of Harrogate, and are Grade II listed by Historic England.

== Attractions ==
=== Sun Pavilion and Colonnade ===
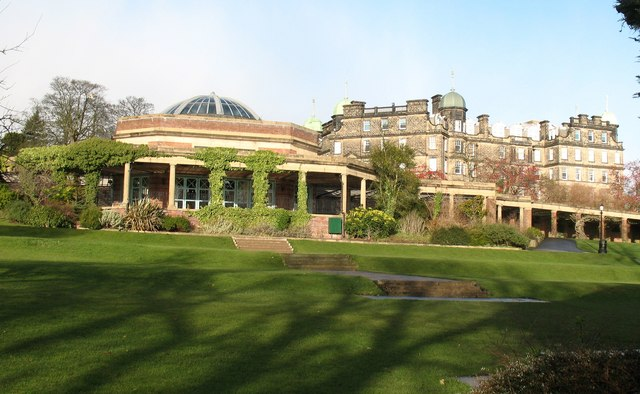
The Sun Pavilion and part of the colonnade

The Sun Pavilion and Colonnade, on the north side of the gardens, was built in 1933 and is a grade II listed building. It is constructed of red brick with concrete dressings imitating sandstone. It consists of a pavilion and a long pergola extending to the east, incorporating smaller pavilions. The main pavilion has a double-height octagonal space with a dome, flanked by single-storey service projections. The main front has three bays, and a large pediment with an entablature. The pergola is a covered promenade with concrete Tuscan columns. The colonnade is punctuated by two smaller double-height semi-octagonal pavilions, and at the eastern end is a rectangular pavilion.

=== Old Magnesia Well Pump Room ===
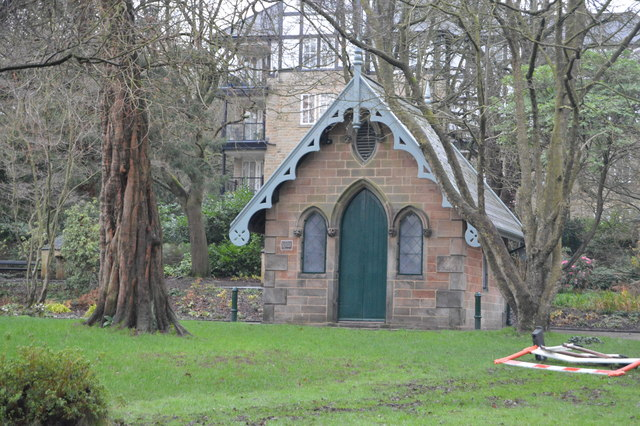
The Old Magnesia Well Pump Room

The Old Magnesia Well Pump Room was built in 1858, for the serving of mineral water. It now serves as a café. It is built of gritstone with rusticated block quoins, and a fishtail slate roof with gables and decorative bargeboards. It has a single storey and two bays, and the building is in Gothic style. The doorway and windows have pointed arches and hood moulds, and in the gable is a lunette with a hood mould. It is a grade II listed building.

=== Other attractions ===
- Pitch and putt golf course
- Model boat pond
- Japanese Garden
- New Zealand Garden
- Play Park
- Tennis courts
- Crazy golf course
- Children's padding pool

In October 2011, part of the play park was the subject of an arson attack. the wooden fortress, which cost £32,000 to install in 2009, was destroyed in the fire.

The pitch and putt golf course is proposed to be replaced with a BMX "pump" track. The numbers using the pitch and putt course have dwindled over the decade until 2023, and the council stated the BMX track would be a year-round attraction. The proposal has been taken forward by North Yorkshire Council, who assumed control of the park from Harrogate Borough Council in April 2023. The pump track would cover an area of 22,000 square feet (2,000 m^{2}), and cost around £2,000 for the council's in-house parks department to install.
