= Paris Pavilion =

Historic building in Harrogate, England

Coordinates: 53°59′12″N 1°33′03″W

The Paris Pavilion is a historic building in Harrogate, a town in North Yorkshire, in England.

The building was constructed some time between 1775 and 1800, as a bath house, with accommodation above. There were various associated cottages and stables, all intended to serve visitors to the town's Cold Bath. It is believed to be named for the Treaty of Paris, and perhaps also the Brighton Pavilion. By 1839, the building had been renamed Harlow Cottage, yet the older name remained in use. It was grade II listed in 1997.

The building is constructed of stone with a slate roof, coped gables and kneelers. It has three storeys and three bays. The central doorway has a fanlight, and the windows are sashes. On the south front is an external staircase and terrace. Southwest of the building is a contemporary wash house. It is built of stone with a slate roof and stone coped gables and kneelers. It has a single storey, and in the north front is a single doorway. It is separately grade II listed.

== See also ==
- Listed buildings in Harrogate (Harlow Moor Ward)
