= Republican Scientific Medical Library =

Belarusian government library

- Рэспубліканская навуковая медыцынская бібліятэка Республиканская научная медицинская библиотека
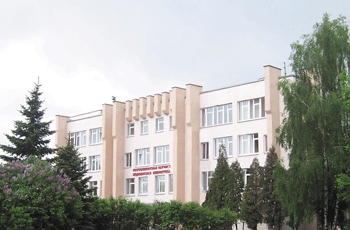
- 53.887306356227946°N 27.543184636738435°E
- Location: Belarus, Minsk, st. Fabricius, 28, 220 007 Index, Belarus
- Established: 1940

Collection
- Items collected: more than 900 000 copies

Access and use
- Population served: 20 000 users per year

Other information
- Director: Vladimir Nikolaevich Soroko
- Website: rsml.med.by

The Republican Scientific Medical Library (RSML) plays a role in providing scientists and specialists, research institutions and medical and preventive treatment facilities, educational establishments and other healthcare facilities of the Republic of Belarus with information and library services.

== History ==
29 May 1939 USSR Narcomzdrav (People's Commissariat of Health of the USSR) issued an order according to which Narcomzdravs of the union republics were to develop the plan of organizing medical library network and to create a fundamental library at each regional health department by the end of 1940. 1940 a separate budget and staff for the BSSR scientific medical library were approved.

1941 the Great Patriotic War interrupted work of the library. All the book stock was destroyed during occupation period. Only in 1944 the Republican scientific medical library of the BSSR Narcomzdrav headed by S.F.Sergeeva resumed its activity according to the BSSR Sovnarcom (Council of People's Commissars) special resolution No. 426.

Since 1975 the library has become a republican branch depository. In January 1995 the European Regional Bureau of the World Health Organization decided to make the library the Centre of the WHO documentation on the territory of the Republic of Belarus.

In 2006 according to the order of the Ministry of Health of the Republic of Belarus No. 640 of 31.10.2005 Museum of History of Belarusian medicine became part of the library. The museum houses the exposition illustrating main periods of development of medicine in Belarus. It includes models, maquettes, dioramas, natural interior scenes and copies of unique documents.

In 2005-2007 the first stage of the project “Creating a system of free access to national and international information resources in the RSML” was successfully carried out. The sponsor of the project was Danish pharmaceutical company “Novo Nordisk A/S”, which has been our friend for 10 years. As a result of project implementation there were established 9 modern points of access to global and national information resources. Now our users have free access to more than 25 international databases that reflect the global flow of medical information, including Russia and CIS countries; the access to Medical Library database of Proquest corporation, which contains full texts of 700 international journals on medicine and health care with deep retrospection and weekly (on-line access) and quarterly updates. Our users can order documents from the world's leading information centers on medicine and health care using telecommunications. Today RSML is the biggest information center on medicine and health care in Belarus. The library serves as national repository and republican depository of medical literature, interlibrary and international loan system, scientific-methodical and coordination center for medical libraries. The library work is aimed at formation and storage of information resources, satisfaction of needs of health care specialists and assistance in conducting of scientific research. In particular, the library, supported by the Ministry of Health, exploits medical scientific Internet portal MED.BY, which consists of 3 sites:

- “ Health care and medicine of Belarus” ;
- Online directory “Health care of Belarus” ;
- All-day information service on availability of medical goods in the drugstores of Minsk .

== Information resources ==
The library stock consists of more than 900 000 documents. There are such kinds of publications as author's abstracts and dissertations, books and booklets, journals and electronic documents on medicine, health care and neighboring areas in Belarusian, Russian, English, German and other languages.

== Information electronic resources generated by the library ==
- Bibliographic database on medicine and related areas “Electronic catalog of SE RSML”. It contains information on books, author's abstracts, dissertations, periodicals and journal articles taken into the library stock since 1991.
- Database “Legislative and regulatory documents of the Ministry of Health of Belarus”. It contains: resolutions, orders, information letters and so on.

== Organizational structure of the RSML ==
More than 80 specialists work in the library.

== See also ==
- List of libraries in Belarus
