= National Library of Belarus =

Library in Minsk, Belarus

Coordinates: 53°55′53″N 27°38′45″E

- Нацыянальная бібліятэка Беларусі (Belarusian); Национальная библиотека Беларуси (Russian)
- Location: Minsk, Belarus
- Established: September 15, 1922

Collection
- Size: ~10 million items

Other information
- Director: Vadzim Gigin
- Website: www.nlb.by

The National Library of Belarus (Belarusian: Нацыянальная бібліятэка Беларусі, romanized: Natsyyanal'naya bibliyateka Byelarusi, Russian: Национальная библиотека Беларуси, romanized: Natsional'naya biblioteka Belarusi) is the largest library in the Republic of Belarus, located in Minsk. It houses the largest collection of Belarusian printed materials and the third largest collection of books in Russian behind the Russian State Library (Moscow) and the Russian National Library (Saint Petersburg).

== Building ==
Construction of the new building started in November 2002 and was completed in January 2006. The library's main architectural component has the shape of a rhombicuboctahedron. The height of the building is 73.6 metres (241.5 feet) and weight is 115 000 tonnes (not including books). The building has 23 floors. The National Library can seat about 2,000 readers and features a 500-seat conference hall. The library's new building was designed by architects Michaił Vinahradaŭ and Viktar Kramarenka and opened on 16 June 2006. The National Library of Belarus is the main information and cultural centre of the country. Its depository collections include about 10 million items of various media.

== Observation deck ==
An elevator leading to the library's roof, located on the twenty-third floor, is present on the backside of the building. The roof has an observation deck equipped with binoculars arranged over the perimeter. There is also a café and a gallery on the twenty-second floor.

== See also ==
- List of libraries in Belarus
