= Harlow Hill Cemetery =

Cemetery in North Yorkshire, England

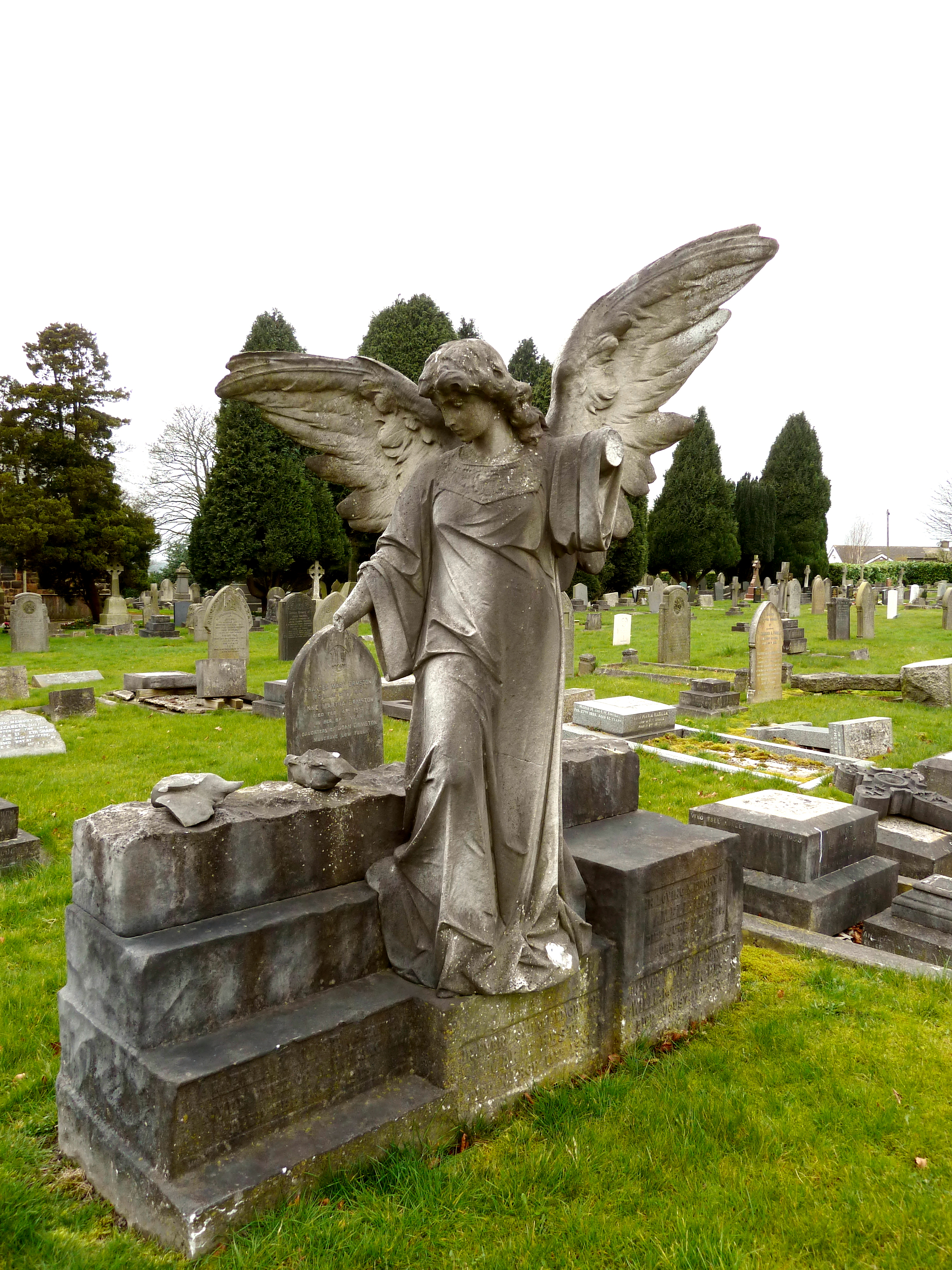
- Harlow Hill Cemetery
- Interactive map of Harlow Hill Cemetery

Details
- Established: 3 October 1871
- Location: Otley Road, Harrogate
- Country: England
- Coordinates: 53°58′50″N 01°33′53″W
- Type: Public, Anglican, War graves, memorial
- Owned by: North Yorkshire Council
- Website: North Yorkshire Council

Harlow Hill Cemetery on Otley Road, Harrogate, North Yorkshire, England, is a local authority cemetery established on land donated by Henry Lascelles, 4th Earl of Harewood in 1869, and consecrated on 3 October 1871 by the Bishop of Ripon. It features the Gothic Revival Church of All Saints, designed by Isaac Thomas Shutt and Alfred Hill Thompson. It has individual memorials to casualties of World Wars I and II, and other graves include those of actor Michael Rennie and Catherine Gurney, an activist in the Temperance movement in the United Kingdom.

== Location and general information ==
Harlow Hill Cemetery is on the north side of Otley Road, near RHS Garden Harlow Carr in Harrogate. It is run by Harrogate Borough Council; It was established in 1869 on land donated by the Earl of Harewood. Although the church was opened on 11 April 1871, the church and cemetery could not be consecrated until 3 October of the same year due to a financial anomaly.

== History ==
=== Early history ===
Harlow Hill is the earliest recorded place of worship in Harrogate. It is likely that a chantry chapel existed on this hill in the 14th century. Harrogate Chantry Chapel is first mentioned in a will of 1439 and was dissolved in 1549. A high cross known as the Great Puddingstone Cross existed close by the site of the chapel from at least 1199, and was gone by 1610. By 1848 there is no mention of a church or cemetery on Harlow Hill.

=== Recent history ===
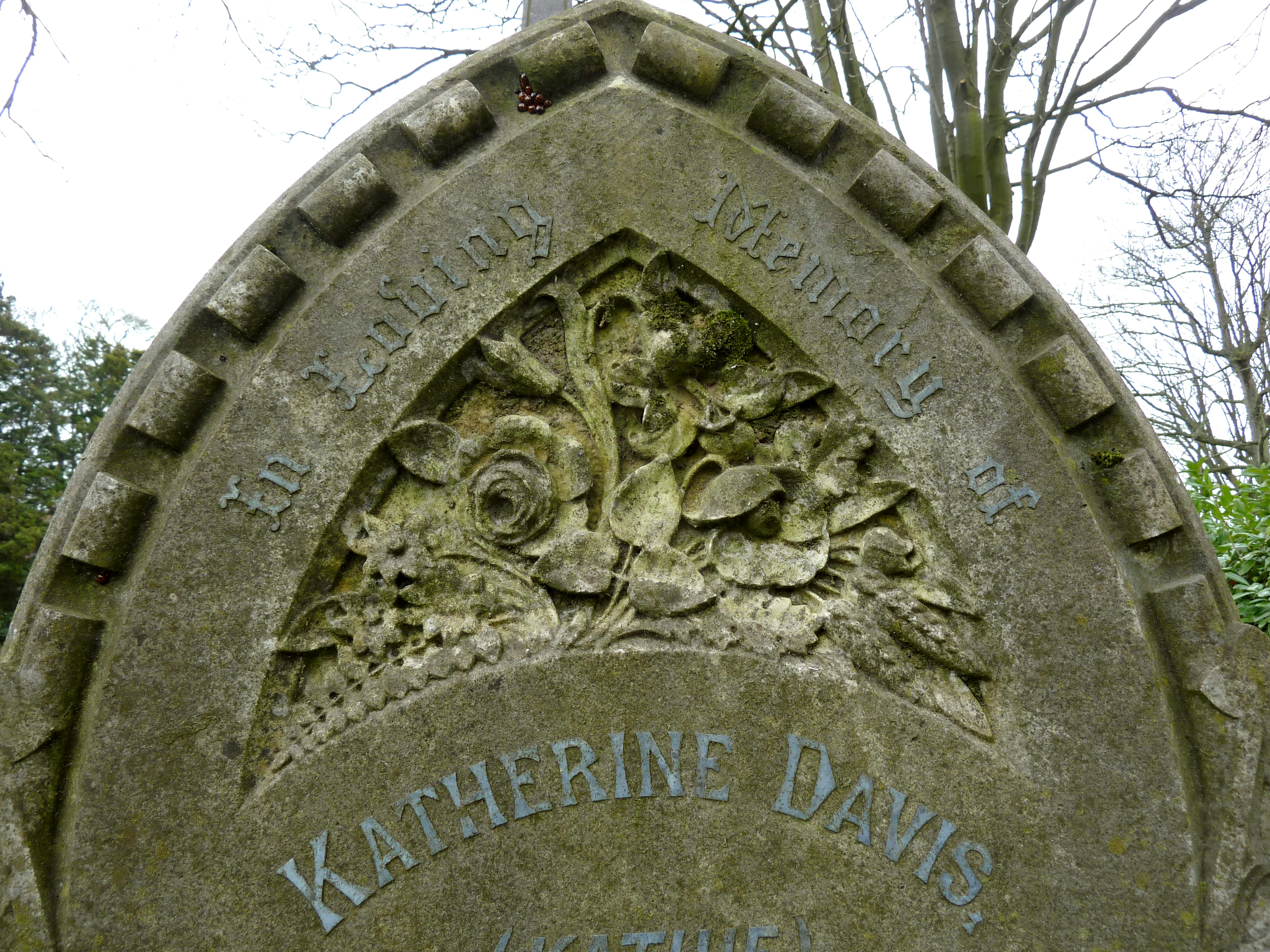
A reinstated memorial

In 2000 at Grove Road Cemetery, Harrogate, a 99-year-old, 2-metre (6.6 ft) high monument fell and killed Reuben Powell aged six years. Harrogate Council responded by contacting those owners of graves who were traceable to ask them to secure their standing stone memorials. Between 2006 and 2010, 6,000 standing monuments with untraceable owners were laid down for safety reasons by the Council. During the same period, "scores of Harrogate district offenders, sentenced to Community Payback" assisted with the reinstatement of over 1,000 of the laid-down memorials. Councillor Les Ellington said, "Not only is this bringing benefit to local communities, who are seeing their cemeteries reinstated, it is saving public funds ... over 60 offenders have also been accredited by York College of Masonry with Open College Network qualifications."

== Chapel ==
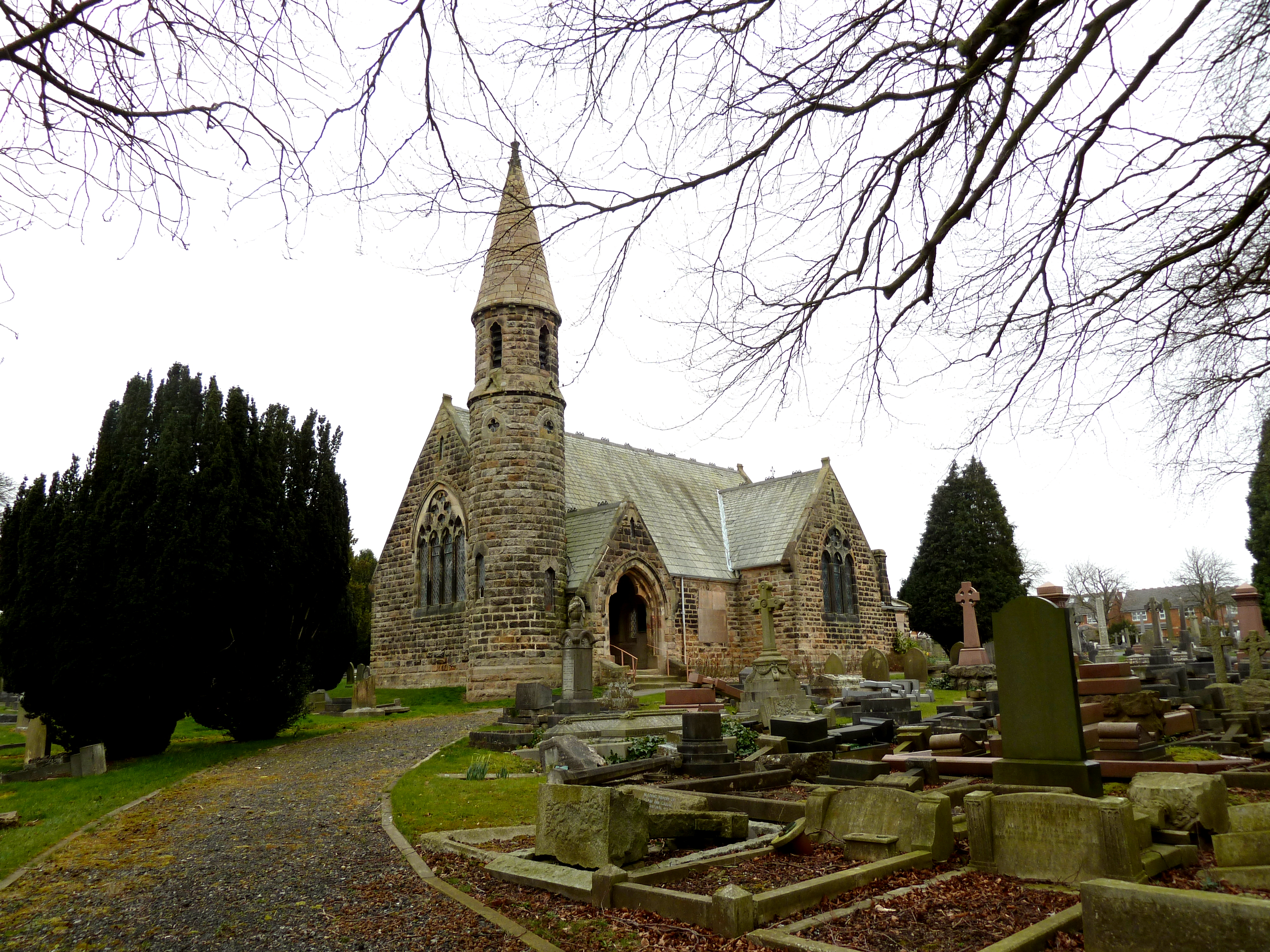
All Saints, Harlow Hill

The plot of land for the chapel and cemetery was donated by Henry Lascelles, 4th Earl of Harewood (1824–1892), and the church was opened in 1871. The chapel was designed by Isaac Thomas Shutt and Alfred Hill Thompson ARIBA, architects.

== Notable burials ==
=== Individual war memorials ===
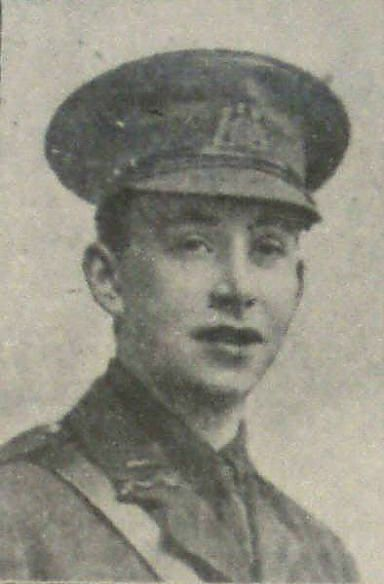
Roy Rayner, d.1916

The Commonwealth War Graves Commission has identified 28 casualties recorded here. There are various individual gravestone-memorials to those killed in World Wars I and II, and the cemetery has been photographed and indexed with war memorials noted.

For example, Donald Luke Abbott (1920–1943) was a prisoner of war in Japanese hands, he was buried at Thanbyuzayat, Burma, in the war cemetery commemorating those who died constructing the Burma-Siam Railway. The stone cross for the Beall family records two brothers killed in action in 1917 and 1916. They are Lieutenant A. Ernest Beall of the King's Own Yorkshire Light Infantry and Lance Sergeant Wilfred R. Beall of the York and Lancaster Regiment. The Campbell stone cross monument records the death in France of Private William Gordon Campbell (1887–1917) of the 46th Battalion of the AIF, or First Australian Imperial Force. The gravestone of the Crawford family tells of Geoffrey Crawford, his parents' only son, who was killed in action in Sumatra in 1942. Fred Foxton, ABRN, (1919–1944) is recorded as missing presumed killed at sea; his sister had already died suddenly at the age of 26. The portrait of Ordinary Seaman Kenneth Mattison RN (1922–1942) C/JX 318042 in sailor's uniform is on his white gravestone; he died at age 19 years of wounds received in action at sea on 17 August 1942. Captain John K. Miller MC was a captain in the Denbighshire Hussars and attached to the Royal Welch Fusiliers. He was killed in action in 1918 near Roussoy, France, and buried in the British cemetery northwest of St Quentin.

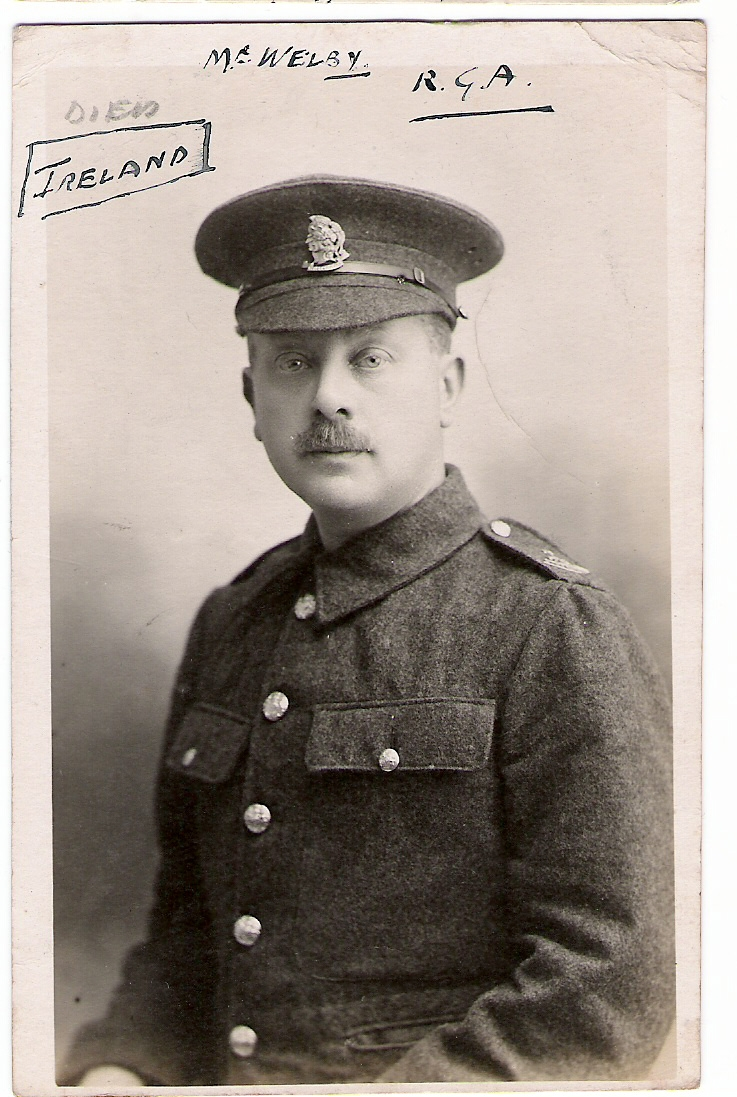
Davis Welby, d.1918

Walter Ranson (Hawke) Oliver (1894–1918) of the 63rd (Royal Naval) Division was killed in action; his monument is a stone cross. Lieutenant Roy Balfour Hodgson Rayner (1893–1916) (pictured) of 15th West Yorkshire Regiment died of wounds in France on 24 May 1916. He was wounded by shrapnel while trying to rescue wounded members of a wiring party. Lieutenant Elwyn George Renton (1886–1918) RASC, attached to the Imperial Camel Corps, died of pneumonia at the Station Hospital, Lahore on 29 May 1918. In peacetime he was a solicitor. Two brothers from the Wooler family died in action, and their monument is a white marble cross. 2nd Lieutenant (active Captain) Charles Armitage Wooler (1895–1916) was in the West Yorkshire Regiment; he was wounded while leading his men into action at the Battle of the Somme, and died at Woolwich Hospital. His brother 2nd Lieutenant Herbert Sykes Wooler 2nd lieutenant of the Royal Artillery (Cantae: Intelligence Officer) of the 12th West Yorkshire Regiment (1893–1916) is buried at Lissenhuek Military Cemetery, Poperinge, Belgium.

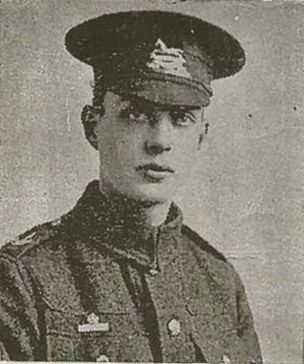
Selwyn Lupton, d.1916

Captain T.W. Youngs of the Border Regiment survived active service and died in 1917. Recorded in plot H.69 is Davis Welby (1875–1918) (pictured), Second Lieutenant of the Royal Garrison Artillery, and previously no. 4539 in the Artists Rifles. He died in Ireland. Private James Alexander Fairley (1896–1916) belonged to the Saskatchewan Regiment of the 1st Battalion, Canadian Mounted Rifles, CEF. Private Selwyn Lupton (1896–1916) 1380 1st/5th West Yorkshire Regiment (pictured) died on 20 January at Wharncliffe War Hospital, Sheffield, from wounds sustained at Ypres on 20 December 1915, having served in France since April 1915. He had the British War and 1915 Star medals. Private Francis Cecil Yates 2093 of 1st/5th West Yorkshire Regiment (now Prince of Wales's Own), from Hookstone Road, Harrogate, was killed in action at Ypres on 28 September 1915 aged 23. Private Clifford Wheeler 235865 of 9th Battalion West Yorkshire Regiment, formerly 330615 Yorkshire Hussars Yeomanry, from West Lea Avenue, Harrogate, died on 9 October 1917 aged 23.

=== Burials and in memoriams ===
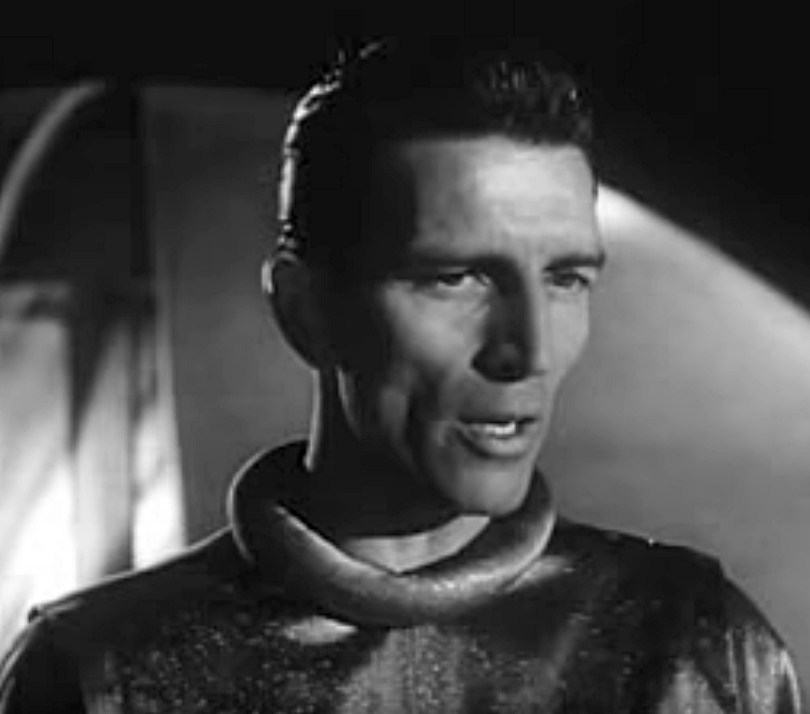
Michael Rennie as Klaatu

The ashes of actor Michael Rennie (1909–1971) are buried in section F, plot 21 under his birth name Eric Alexander Rennie. He is remembered in particular for his role as Klaatu in the 1951 film The Day the Earth Stood Still. The stone cross monument for Thomas Roger Carr in section F records two premature deaths: Carr (1899–1926) was killed in an accident, and his father Thomas (1858–1911) was lost at sea. The Louise Clark stone cross monument records Moorhouse Clark (1872–1935), who was the classical master of Denstone College for twenty years, then vicar of Croxton and Hollington for eleven years. Catherine Gurney (1848–1930) was the founder in 1883 of the International Christian Police, and founder in 1898 of the Northern Police Orphanage in Harrogate, besides being an activist in the Temperance Movement. Her original headstone has been replaced with a new black marble one. Alfred Mantle (1846–1924) was a physician; his monument is a stone cross. Carle Mumme (1838–1919) was a shipbuilder from Dungallon, Greenock; he has an elaborate memorial of an angel and cross. James Walter Nuttall (1862–1928) was headmaster of Clifton House School, 6 Queen Parade, Harrogate, and his monument is a carved Celtic cross. George Mearns Savery (1850–1905) was an educator, and founder of Harrogate Ladies' College. He developed the school in collaboration with headmistress Elizabeth Wilhelmina Jones (1869–1959), whose grave is close by his.

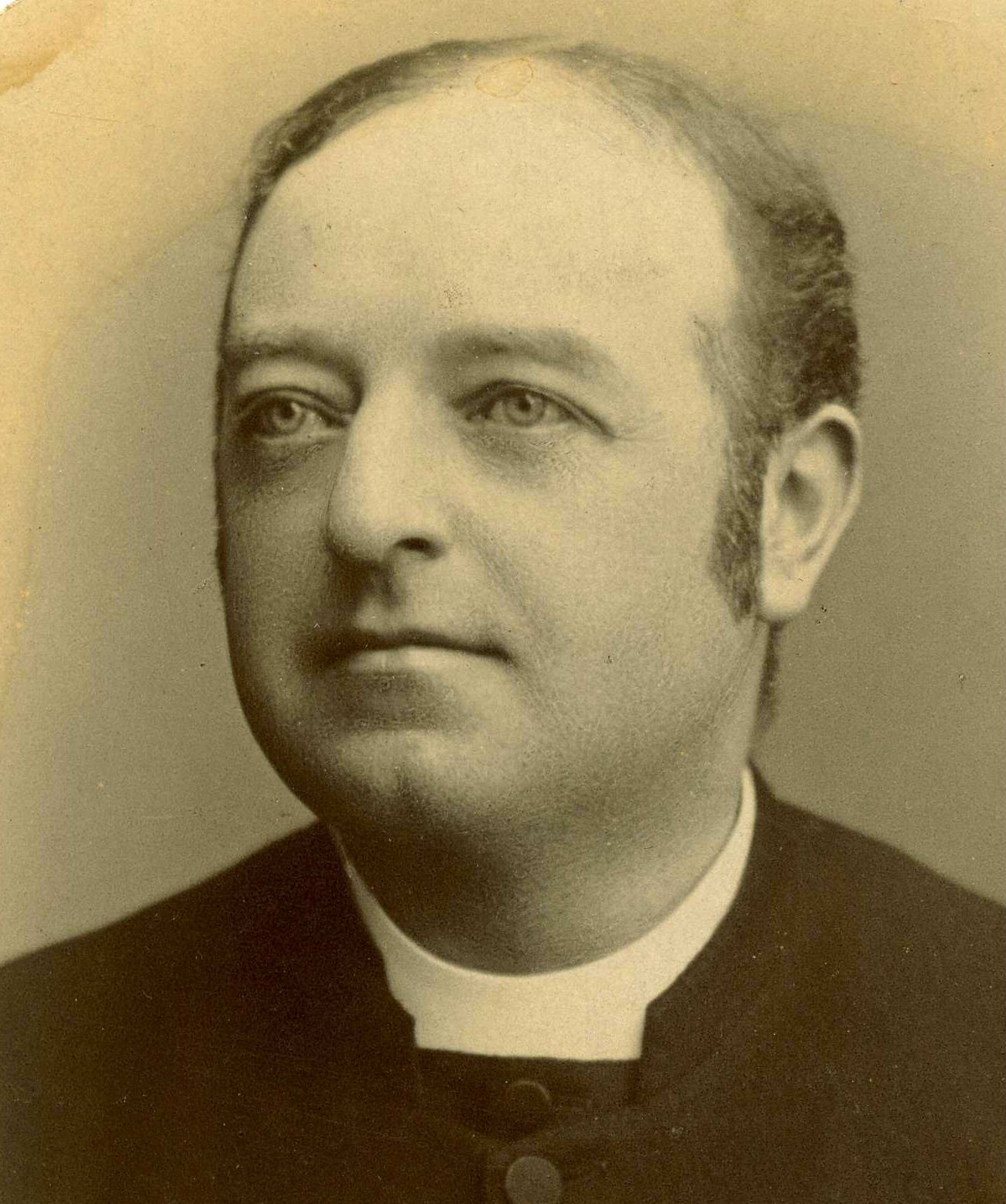
Charles Farrar Forster

Charles Farrar Forster (1848–1894) was the first vicar of Beckwithshaw Church, dedicating himself to parochial work despite severe pain due to heart disease. Gertrude Alina Paitson (1880–1921) was a nurse; her monument is a stone cross. Emily Perry, a nanny who died in 1941, was buried under a stone Celtic cross in the same grave as the family she cared for at Grey Court, 57 Kent Road, Harrogate, the residence of John Joseph Prest (1859–1933), JP. Arthur Vasey Thomas (1906–1930) of Nitter Hill and Oakdale Farm, Penny Pot Lane, Harrogate, died in a road accident. He overtook a motor-bus and hit a bus coming the other way, near Pateley Bridge. Samuel George Mower Webb (1843–1929) was rector or vicar of All Saints Church, Saxton with Scarthingwell (1878–1903), of St Mary the Virgin, Kirk Fenton, West Yorkshire (1903–1911), and of St Andrew's Church, Newton Kyme (1911–1912). Atherton West (1954–1923) was a weaving master of Elgin Mills, Kanpur, who founded Victoria Mill, now Atherton Mills, in Kanpur, India in 1885. John Arthur Green (d.1926) was one of the founder members and first secretary of the Yorkshire Ramblers' Club, and a runner in Leeds Harriers in the late 1880s. He worked for the North Eastern Railway, and for Beckett's Bank. He was manager in turn of Leeds, Mansfield and Harrogate branches of the Yorkshire Penny Bank. He was a climber and potholer, and was one of the first party to descend Pillar Pot and Rift Pot. Margaret Ingilby or Ingleby (1827–1894) was one of the Ingilbys of Lawkland Hall, Lawkland, who in turn were related to the Ingilbys of Ripley Castle. Landscape painter Bernard Walter Evans was buried here in 1922.
