= Djediufankh =

Djediufankh was an ancient Egyptian priest who lived between 2,000 and 4,000 years ago.

In 2005, what are believed to be the remains of Djediufankh were found in a 26 cm–high canopic jar in the Royal Pump Room Museum, in Harrogate, England. Experts at York University have established that the residue in the jar is cholesterol from human remains. Their tests also confirmed that the Egyptians had sterilised the body and entrails using date palm wine as an antiseptic, confirming for the first time the descriptions given by classical authors such as the ancient Greek historian Herodotus.

The organs stored inside the jar had also been treated with an aromatic spice, most likely scented cinnamon or cassia, imported from southeast Asia.

== See also ==
- Essential oil
- Fragrance oil
