= Isaac Thomas Shutt =

English architect (1818–1879)

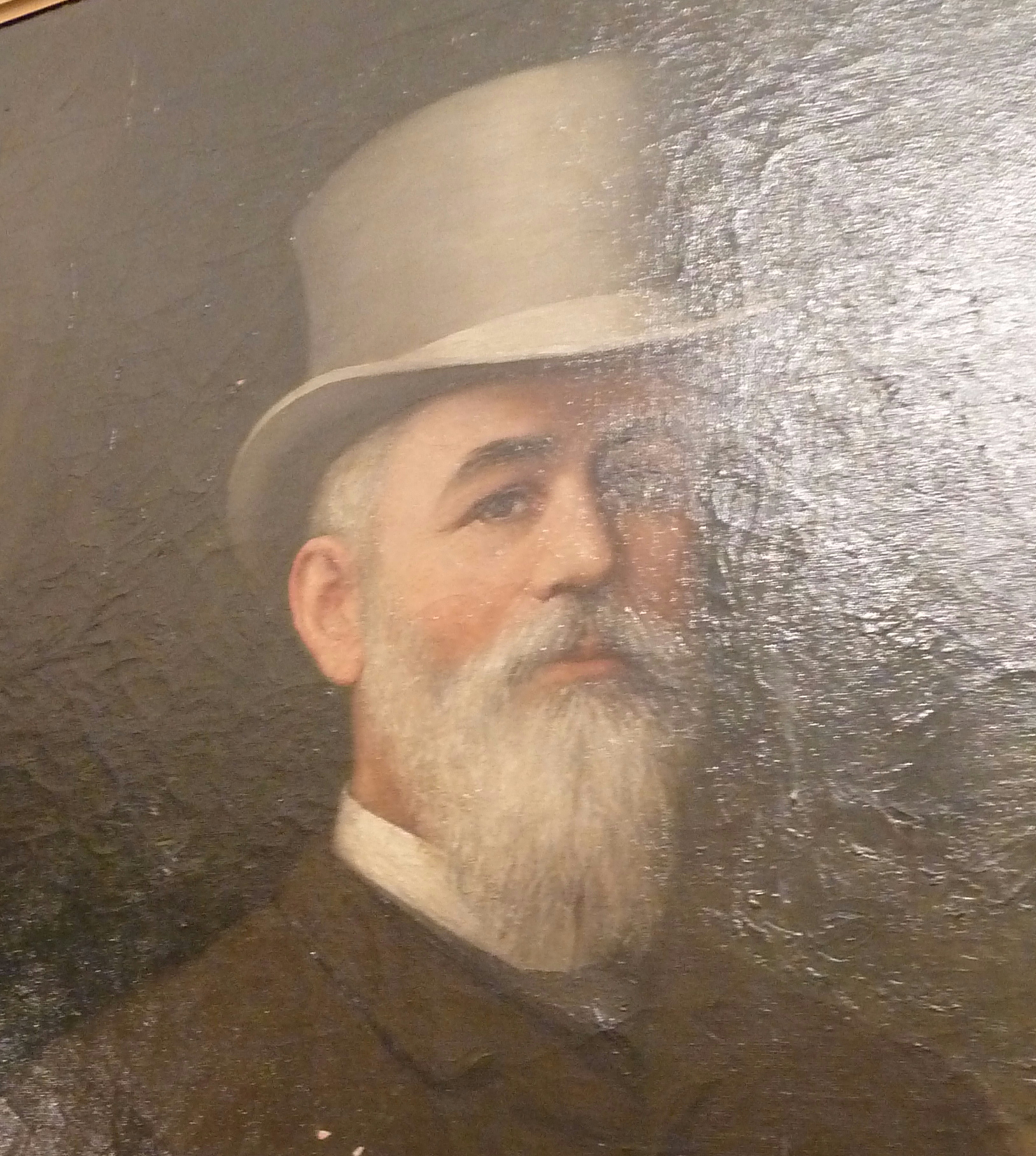
- Isaac Thomas Shutt, around 1870
- Born: 21 February 1818; Harrogate
- Died: 14 March 1879 (aged 61); Knaresborough
- Occupation: Architect
- Practice: (1841–1870) I.T. Shutt (1870–1871) Shutt & Thompson (1871–1879) I.T. Shutt
- Buildings: Royal Pump Room, 1842; All Saints, Harlow Hill, 1871

Isaac Thomas Shutt (21 February 1818 – 14 March 1879) was an architect, a farmer, and the proprietor of the Old Swan Hotel, Harrogate, then in the West Riding of Yorkshire, England, from 1849 to 1879. In 1842, at the age of 24 years, he designed the Royal Pump Room, Harrogate, now a Grade II* listed building. In partnership with Alfred Hill Thompson he co-designed the Church of All Saints, Harlow Hill.

== Personal life ==
His father was Jonathan Shutt (d.1840), who was for thirty years owner of the Swan Hotel, Harrogate (now the Old Swan Hotel), and his mother was Ann Shutt (1781 – 8 March 1848).

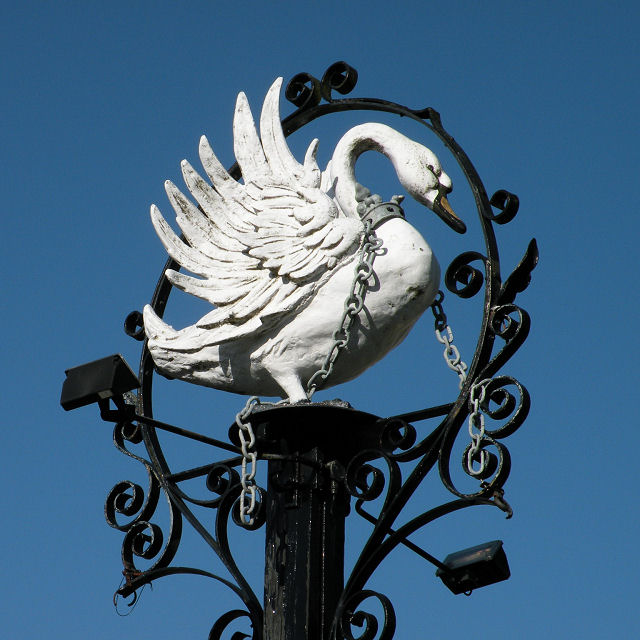
Sign of the Old Swan Hotel, which he inherited in 1849

Isaac Thomas Shutt was born in Harrogate on 21 February 1818, and baptised on 6 December 1818 at Christ Church, High Harrogate. In 1841 he was in Victoria Place, St Saviour, Southwark, an architect aged 22, lodging with grocer James Slater and his family. At St George, Hanover Square in 1849 he married Ann Staning (1825–20 February 1875), who was born in Winchester and died in Knaresborough.

During his lifetime, the census tracks his comfortable lifestyle and steady acquisition of wealth. By 1851 he had become the proprietor of the Swan Hotel (now the Old Swan Hotel) in Promenade Road, Harrogate, and he was listed as an architect, surveyor and land owner. He was 33 years old, his wife was 26, and they had two children aged one year and three months. There were ten servants, including two nursemaids and a groom. In 1861 they were still at the Swan Hotel, and Shutt was listed as an architect, farmer and hotel keeper. He was 43, his wife was 35, they had six children aged from 2 to 11 years, and ten servants including a nurse, gardener and gardener's boy. In 1871 he was again listed as a hotel-keeper and architect aged 53, and still living at the Swan Hotel, Harrogate with Ann aged 46 and five of their children aged 7 to 20 years. By 1878 he owned hunters and harness horses, and a groom to look after them and to drive a carriage. He moved to Cygnet House in Walker Road after the sale of The Swan.

=== Death ===
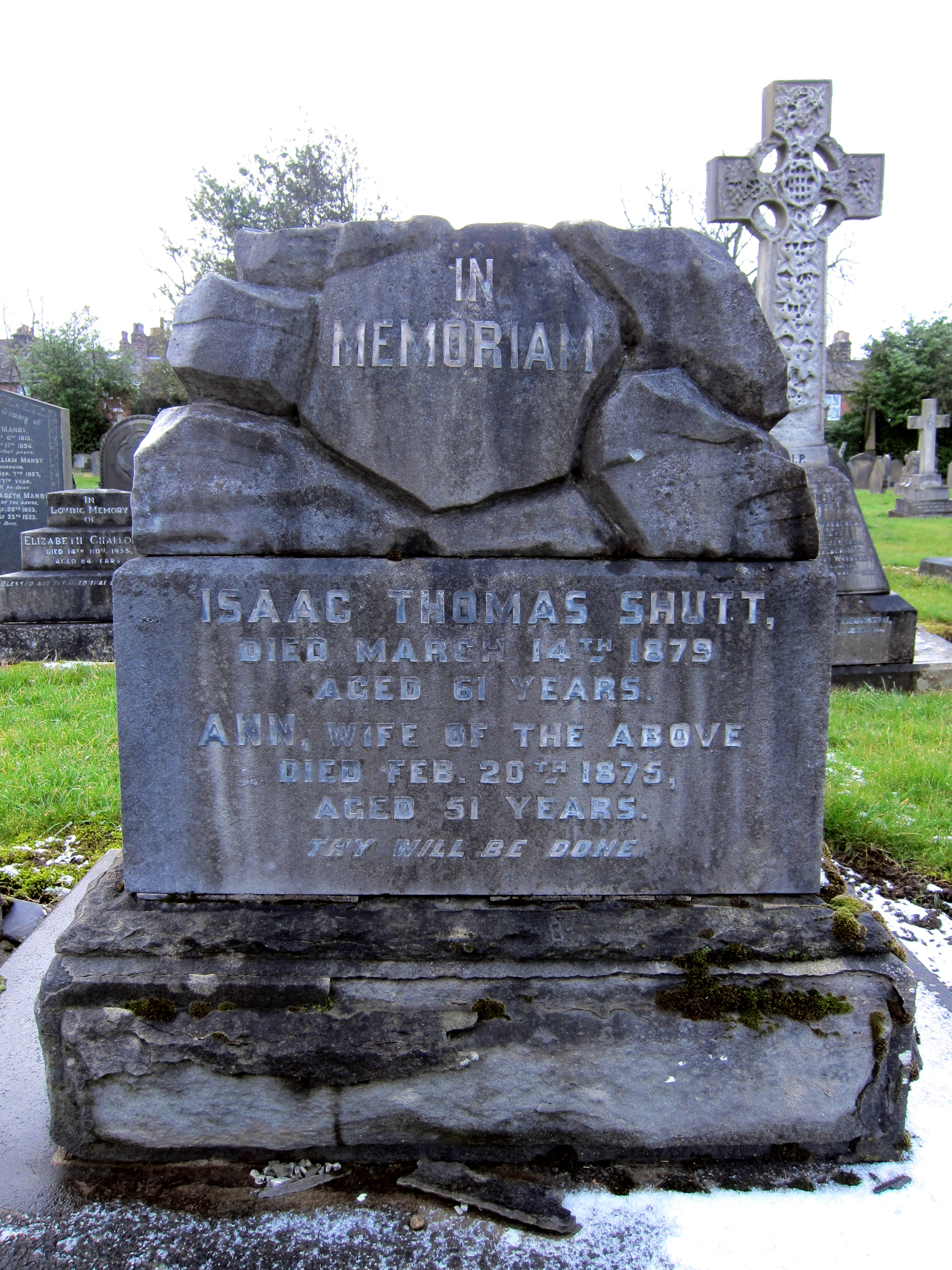
Gravestone of I.T. Shutt

Shutt died at his home, Cygnet House, Harrogate, on 14 March 1879, aged 61 years, after a "severe and painful illness." He was described at his death as an architect and land surveyor of Harrogate. His will was proved at Wakefield on 3 April 1879. The Pateley Bridge and Nidderdale Herald said he was a "kind and genial man, who never hesitated to fulfil those public duties which his clear mind, large experience and position in the town appeared to demand ... He died in harness as a member of the Harrogate Local Board, a position which he ... held for many years." He was buried on 19 March 1879 at Harrogate Cemetery, now known as Grove Road Cemetery, in section D, plot 324. (Note: The gravestone gives the date of death as 14 March, but the newspaper death notice and the legal announcement of probate both give the date as 15 March.)

== Career ==
=== Architecture and surveying ===
By 1841, Shutt was an architect lodging in Southwark.

=== Swan Hotel (now the Old Swan Hotel) ===
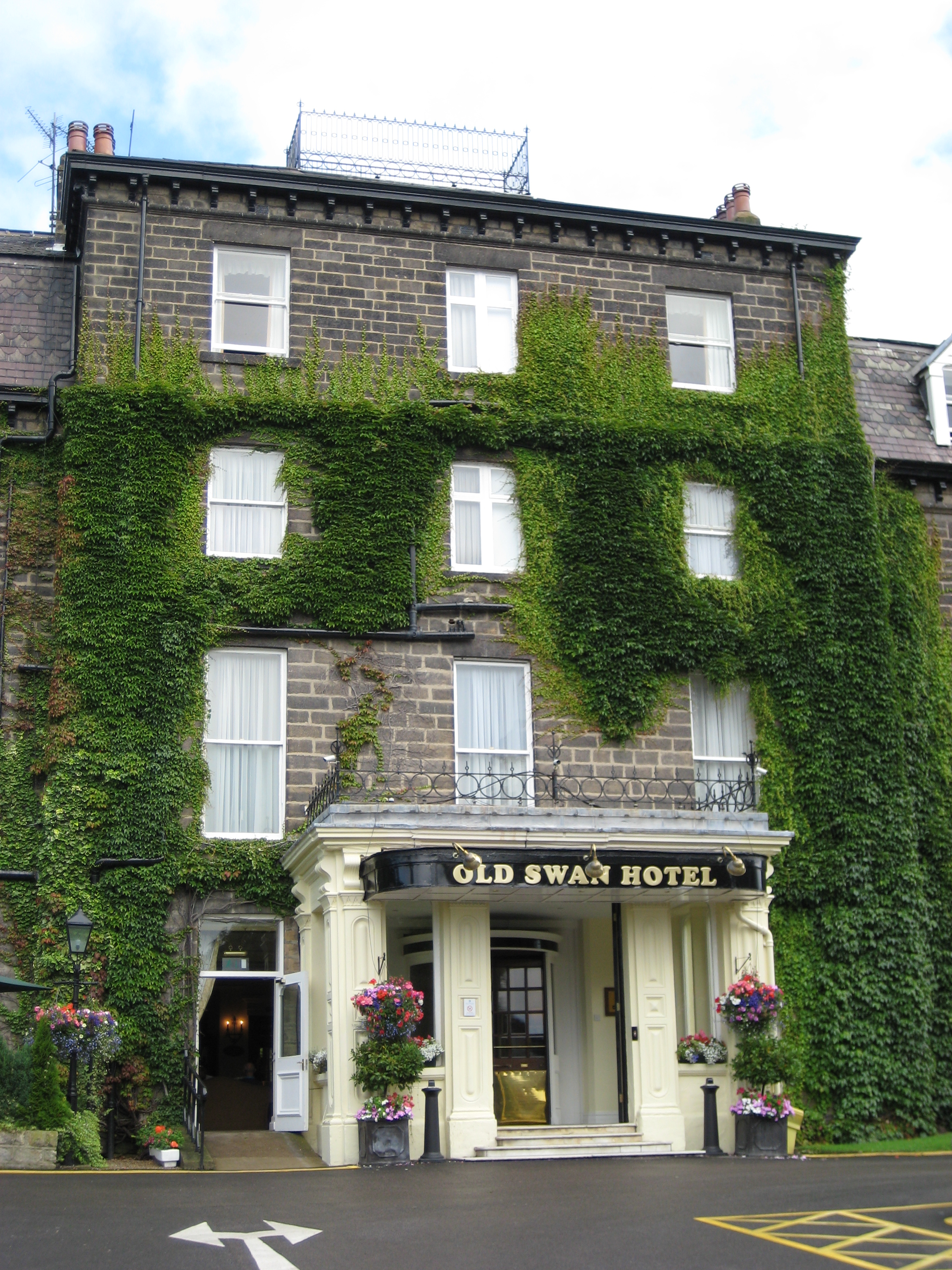
Old Swan Hotel

In 1849 Shutt inherited the ownership of the Swan Hotel, Harrogate, which had previously been run by his sisters, and before that by their father Jonathan Shutt, who was its proprietor and occupier for thirty years. It had gardens and pleasure gardens, hot and cold indoor baths, wines, private sitting rooms with fires and wax lights, personal attendance by a waiter and chambermaid, stabling, lock-up coach-houses and servants' apartments, a boots and an ostler. Accommodation cost up to £2 12s 6d per week, plus extras. In 1878 Shutt sold or rented the Swan Hotel to the Harrogate Hydropathic Company Ltd, of which he was one of the directors. The company was formed for the provision of a hydropathic curative treatment which made use of the local spa waters; the Swan Hotel was to be adapted and redecorated for the purpose.

Media related to Old Swan Hotel, Harrogate at Wikimedia Commons

=== Agriculture and agricultural shows ===
In 1847 he was vice-chairman of the Pannal and Harrogate Agricultural Society, and in that year its fourth annual exhibition was held in a field near the Swan Hotel, then run by Shutt's father and sisters, and in the Pump Room, now the Royal Pump Room Museum. In the same year he was listed as having a game certificate, that is, he was licensed to sell game from Bilton, Harrogate. Shutt had some success with livestock: he won first prize for "his celebrated prize bull, Baronet" at Ripley Agricultural Show on Tuesday 20 September 1859. At the dog-show section of the 1878 Ripon and Harrogate Agricultural Show, Shutt donated a special prize for the best animal in the broken-haired terrier classes. (Note: Some sources state that I.T. Shutt's brother owned and managed the farmland associated with the Swan Hotel, but all the above sources in the Agriculture and agricultural shows section credit I.T. Shutt by name.)

=== Business and finance ===
In April 1841 he was dealing in property, advertising Cornwall House, Low Harrogate, for sale. He was at one point a stockbroker in Harrogate, in partnership with John Cheyne; this was dissolved on 20 November 1845, possibly due to bankruptcy. In 1862 Shutt was serving on a committee set up to sell shares in the Cheltenham Room and grounds in Harrogate. This was a public place of amusement which was up for sale, and the town did not want the establishment to fall into private hands and be closed. He was a member of the Harrogate Improvement Commissioners and Local Board of Health from about 1848 until at least 1971, when he replied to a speech at the opening of the Baths at Harrogate.

== Independent architectural designs ==
=== Pump Room, Harrogate, 1842 ===
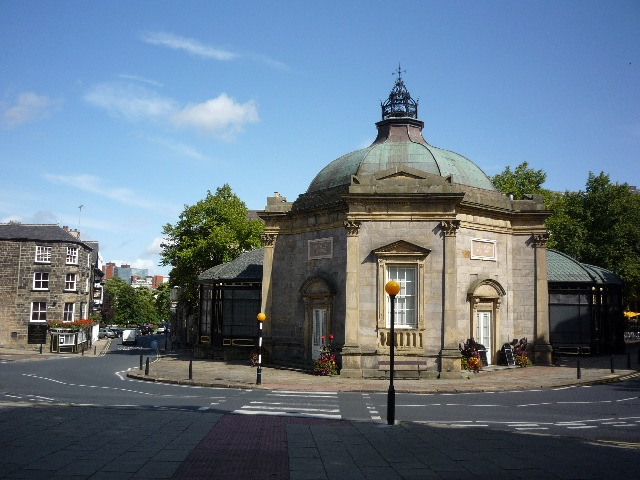
Royal Pump Room

In 1842 at the age of 24 years he designed the neo-classical Cheltenham Pump Room in Harrogate, a Grade II* listed building which is now known as the Royal Pump Room. The glazed Annexe was added in 1913 by architect Leonard Clarke (fl.1913–1939) In his obituary, the Pateley Bridge and Nidderdale Herald said, "Mr Shutt, as an architect, has left behind him numerous specimens of his skill, foremost amongst which is the Royal Sulphur Well – a piece of architecture surpassing in originality of design and suitability to its object any similar work of its day in Harrogate."

Media related to Pump Room, Harrogate at Wikimedia Commons

=== Villa frontages in Low Harrogate, 1846 ===
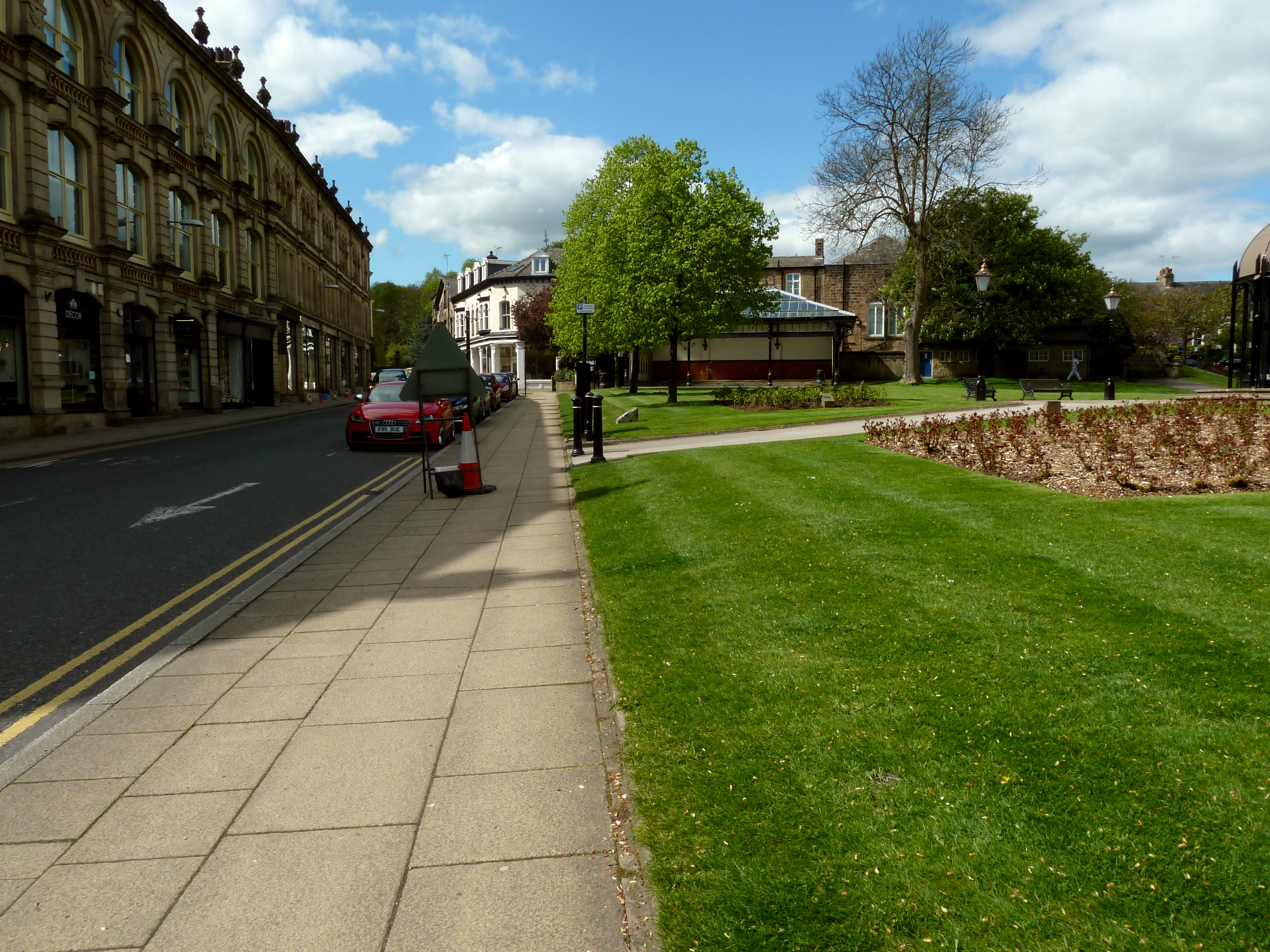
Site of villas

On 9 February 1846 an auction took place for five building plots to the west of the old Crescent Inn, which then stood in what is now Crescent Road, Harrogate, North Yorkshire. Purchasers were obliged to build according to an elevation designed by Shutt. To the north of the properties was a beck, and to the north of the beck were gardens attached to the Victoria Baths. These lots were "open to the Stray, within sight of the public wells and Montpelier Gardens, and commanding a full view of the Cheltenham Pump Room and its extensive pleasure grounds." The site, including the Crescent Inn, was cleared in the 1890s to make way for the present Crescent Gardens. (Note: See image of history plaque erected on the site by Harrogate Council: File:Crescent Gardens Harrogate 005.jpg It says that the buildings on Crescent Road were cleared in the 1890s to make way for the Crescent Gardens)

=== Workhouse, Knaresborough, 1857 ===
Shutt provided a specification and design for a workhouse on the east side of Stockwell Road, Knaresborough, North Yorkshire. It was to replace an earlier 18th century one next to St John the Baptist church. (Note: Image of Knaresborough Workshouse, 1990 Retrieved 7 April 2014. By 1990 the workhouse was an infirmary consisting of 4 buildings, and Shutt's original workhouse is the second building from the top.) This plan was approved by the Knaresborough Board of Guardians, who said there should be a water cistern on top. This was recorded at a board meeting on Wednesday 15 October 1856. The works were to be completed by 1 June 1857. Three buildings were later added to the site to form an infirmary, then the buildings were demolished in 1996 and the land was redeveloped for housing.

Media related to Knaresborough Workhouse at Wikimedia Commons

== Architectural designs in partnership ==
Shutt, whose office was at the Swan Hotel, Harrogate, worked in partnership with Alfred Hill Thompson of 14 Park Square, Leeds, from 1870 to 1871, and possibly before and after that.

=== Church of All Saints, Harlow Hill, 1870–1871 ===
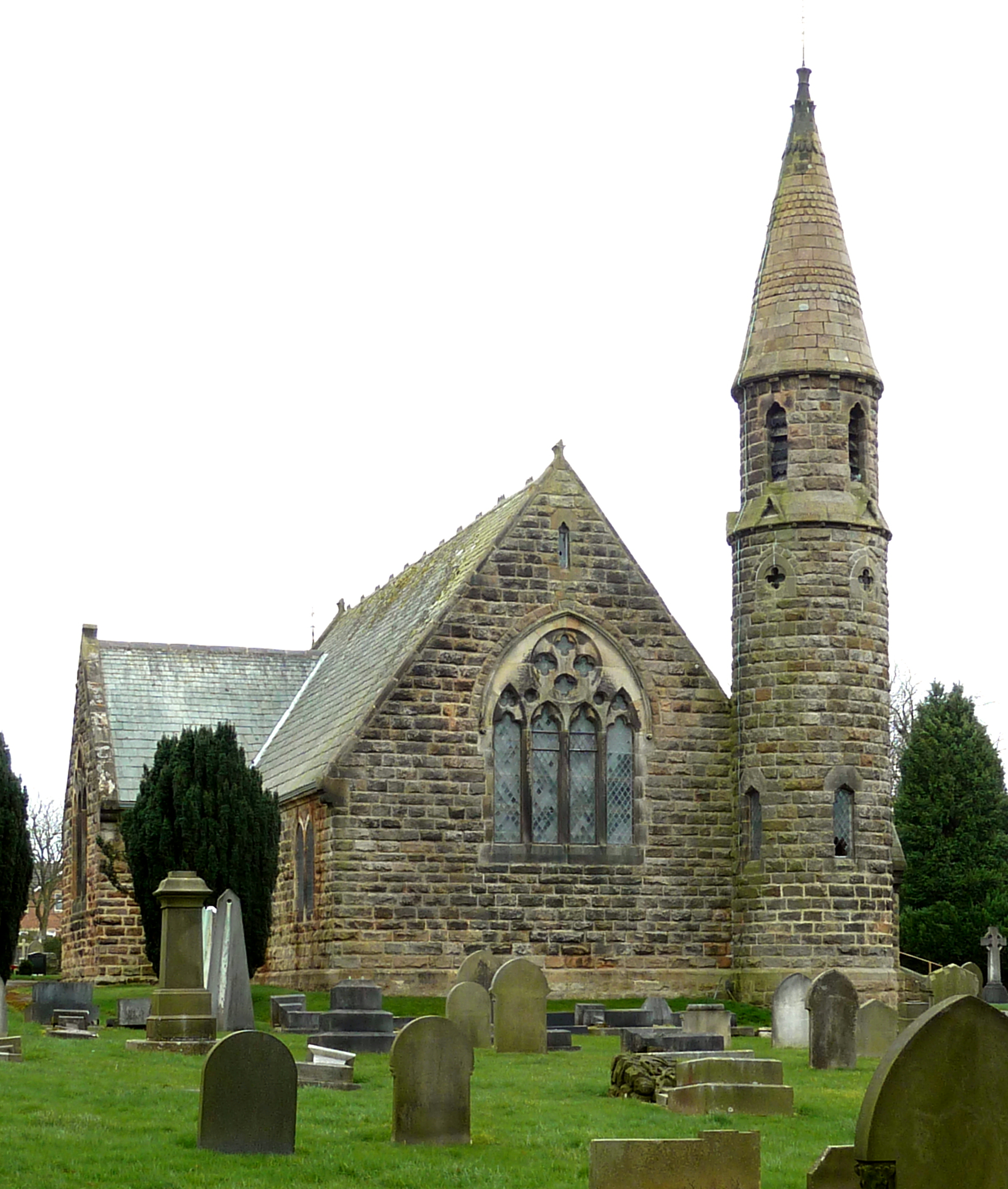
All Saints Harlow Hill

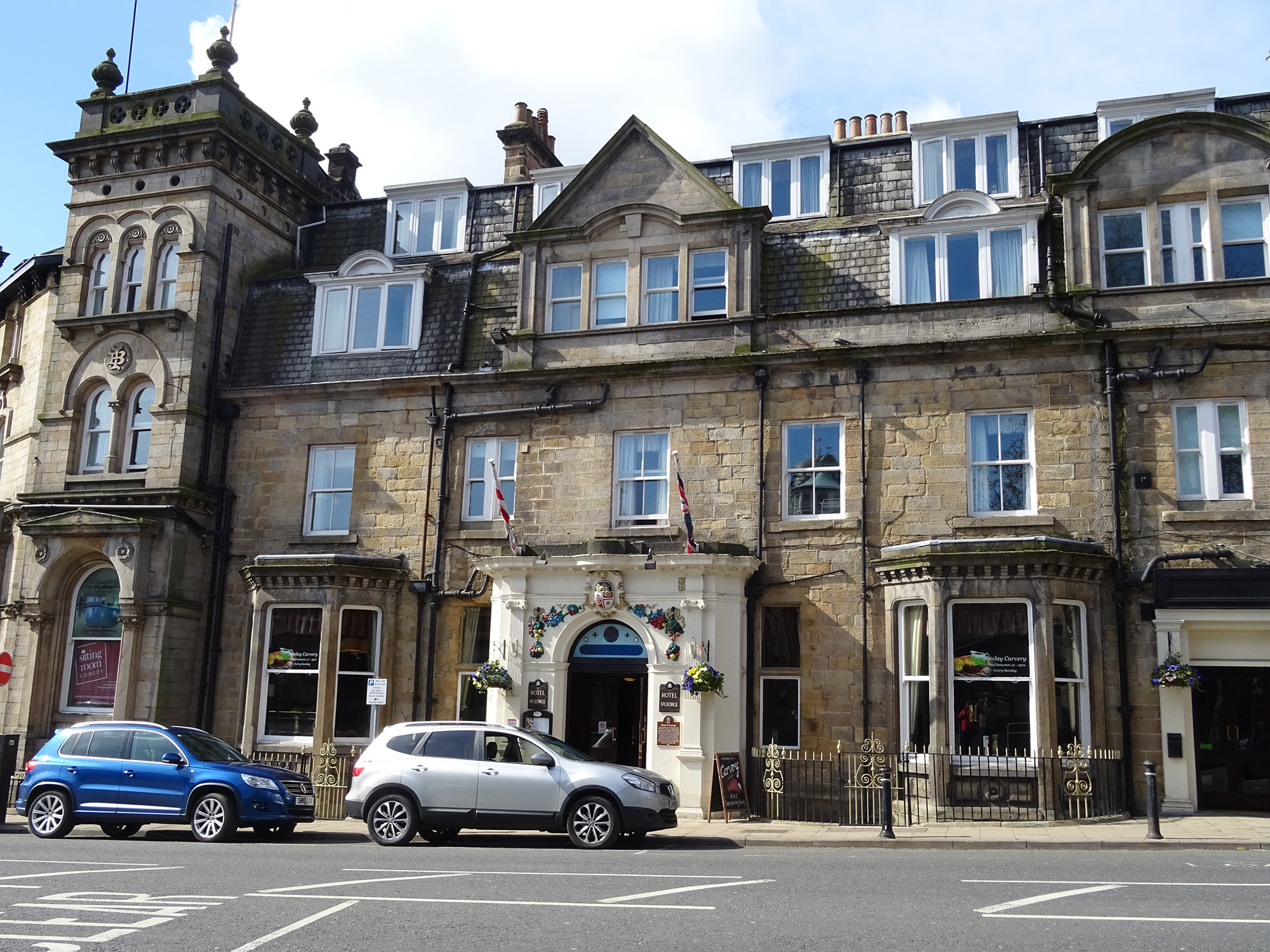
St George Hotel

This is a Grade II listed building, built as a mission church, or chapel of ease, consecrated by the Bishop of Ripon in 1871. It has a "circular bell tower reminiscent of Irish bell-houses". It is not known whether Shutt drew plans or supervised construction, but Gothic Revival churches and towers require design skills which Shutt had not previously demonstrated. This raises the question as to whether the partnership came into being because Strutt had the connections by which to gain the commission, and Thompson ARIBA was the project architect. After some years of closure due to wet and dry rot, as of 2014 the building was being restored for use by a funeral director company.

Media related to Church of All Saints, Harlow Hill at Wikimedia Commons

=== George Hotel, Harrogate, 1871 ===
Thompson and Shutt designed the enlargement for the George Hotel, Harrogate, and advertised for tenders for building work to be received by 26 October 1871. The plans were kept at Thompson's office in Leeds, but both architects held the bills of quantities for the builders. This highlights a possibility that it was Thompson who was mostly responsible for the plans.

Media related to St. George Hotel, Harrogate at Wikimedia Commons
