= Church of All Saints, Harlow Hill =

Grade II listed church in North Yorkshire, England

- All Saints Chapel of Ease, Harlow Hill
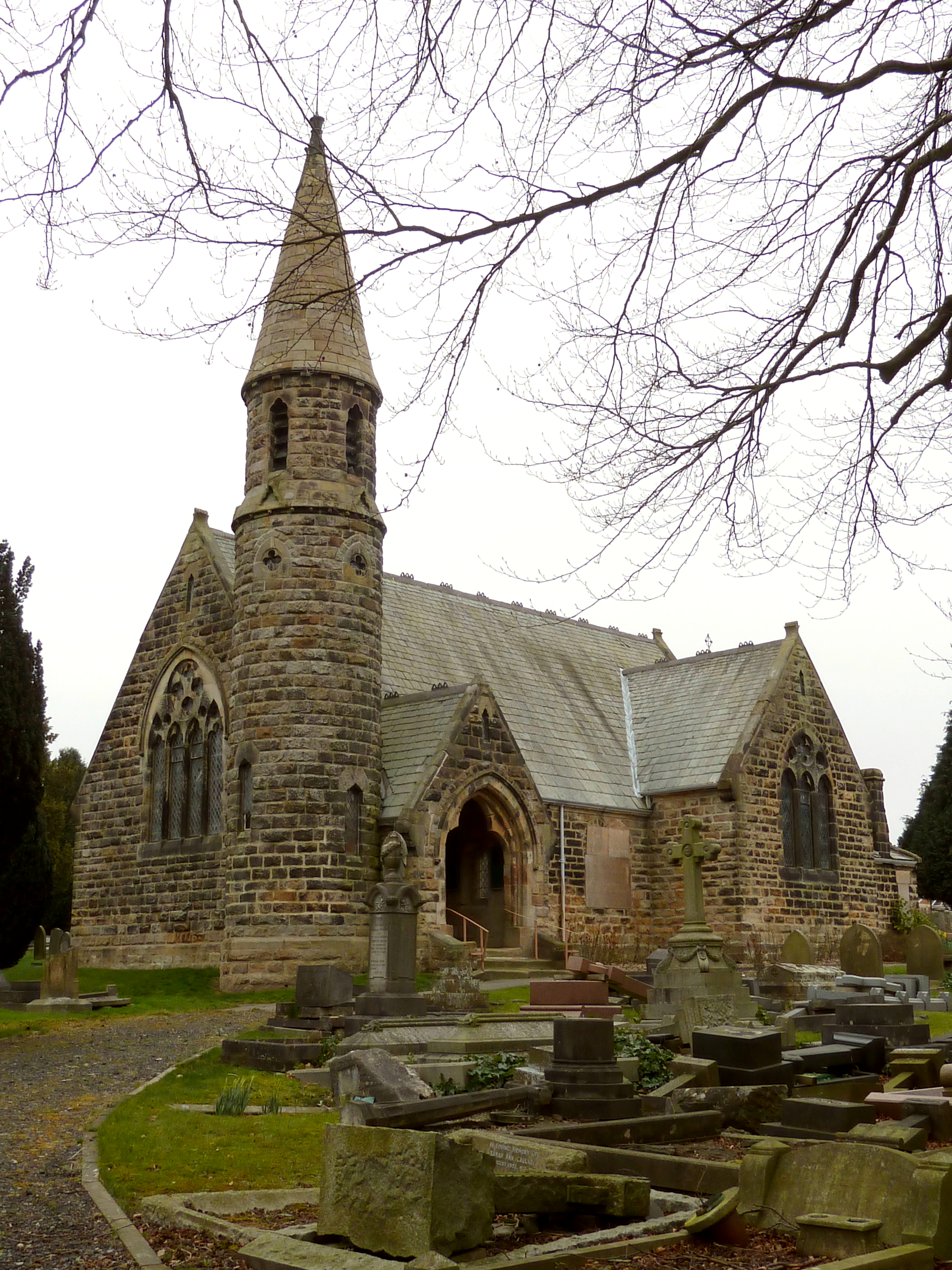
- Church of All Saints, Harlow Hill

- Location in North Yorkshire
- 53°58′50″N 1°33′54″W
- OS grid reference: SE 28620 53921
- Location: Otley Road, Harrogate, North Yorkshire, HG3 1PT
- Country: England
- Denomination: Anglican
- Website: Harrogate Borough Council: cemeteries

History
- Status: Deconsecrated
- Founded: 19 April 1870
- Dedication: All Saints
- Consecrated: 25 August 1871

Architecture
- Functional status: Under restoration as a private home
- Heritage designation: Grade II listed #1294025
- Designated: 4 February 1975
- Architect(s): I.T. Shutt & A.H. Thompson ARIBA
- Architectural type: Mission church, cemetery chapel
- Style: Gothic Revival, Arts and Crafts
- Closed: 2009

The Church of All Saints, Harlow Hill, Harrogate, North Yorkshire, England, is a grade II listed mission church, or chapel of ease, completed in 1871 on land donated by Henry Lascelles, 4th Earl of Harewood, within the parish of St Mary. It was consecrated by the Bishop of Ripon in 1871. The building was designed with a round bell tower, in Gothic Revival style, by Isaac Thomas Shutt and Alfred Hill Thompson. After some years of closure due to structural problems, as of 2014 it was being restored for use by a funeral director's company.

== History ==
By the 1860s, Harrogate was growing westwards, and St Mary's parish required another church to accommodate the increasing number of parishioners, and to provide at the same time a mission church and chapel of ease. The Church of St Mary had no burial ground and needed one, so a large plot of land was donated by Henry Lascelles, 4th Earl of Harewood (1824–1892) so that All Saints was from the beginning a cemetery chapel. On 19 April 1870, the foundation stone was laid on the porch, and it carries this legend: "To the glory of God. As a memorial of the foundation of this church, this stone was laid on April 19, 1870. Claude W. Roberts, Curate in Charge. I.T. Shutt, A.H. Thompson ARIBA, architects."

=== Opening and consecration ===
The building was opened by the Bishop of Ripon on Tuesday 11 April 1871. After the opening, the Bishop, clergy and guests were treated to a cold collation at the Adelphi Hotel, Harrogate. Due to "some technical informalities in connection with the title deeds in the conveyance of the church and land", the consecration was delayed until after the opening, so that for the opening the Bishop had to be granted a licence for holding the service in the church. The building and graveyard were therefore consecrated on Friday 25 August 1871 by the same bishop in a "strong breeze" and under a sun of "great power", accompanied by a large group of clergymen and church officials in their vestments. This was more than a year after the foundation stone was laid, the consecration cross having long been carved in the wall below the foundation stone in the porch. The Building News and Engineering Journal said: "The building itself is not unostentatious, yet not without architectural pretensions; and is designed in the continental style of Gothic architecture ... The roof is open-timbered, and the whole interior is effective and handsome. The exterior is bold in style, and free from much ornamentation."

=== People and events ===
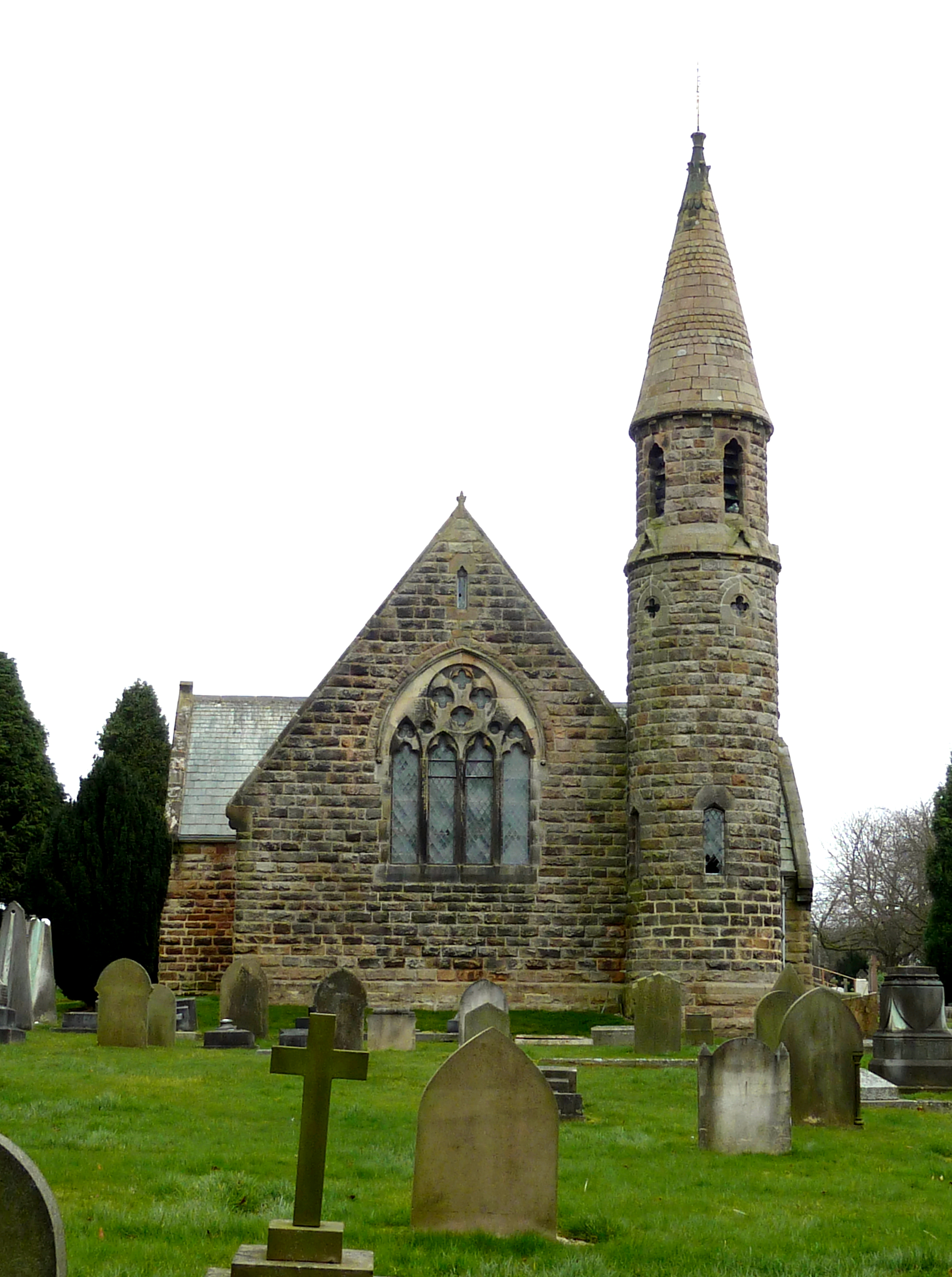
All Saints Church from the west

The church was run by the vicar of St Mary's, who hosted the vestry meetings, and appointed churchwardens and sidesmen. It never had its own vicar. A major figure in the early days of All Saints was Rev. G. O. Brownrigg, who worked for seventeen years in the large parish of St Mary's, All Saints and Oatlands Mount, with their respective day and Sunday schools. He became ill and moved to Eastbourne, succeeded in 1893 in the parish by Rev. J. Chapman of Christ Church Highbury. The organist and choir master at All Saints in the early days was Frederic Bartle (1834–1895), father of twelve children and headmaster of St Mary's Church School.

A major event in April 1888 was the funeral of Joseph Fletcher (1824–1888) a saddler of Royal Parade, who had many friends and business acquaintances. Blinds were drawn in Royal Parade, and the hearse and four carriages were preceded by tradesmen walking solemnly, two abreast, all the way to Harlow Hill. His pallbearers were his workmen, and his coffin was pitch-pine with brass mountings and an engraved plate. He is buried on the north side of the cemetery.

== Building exterior ==
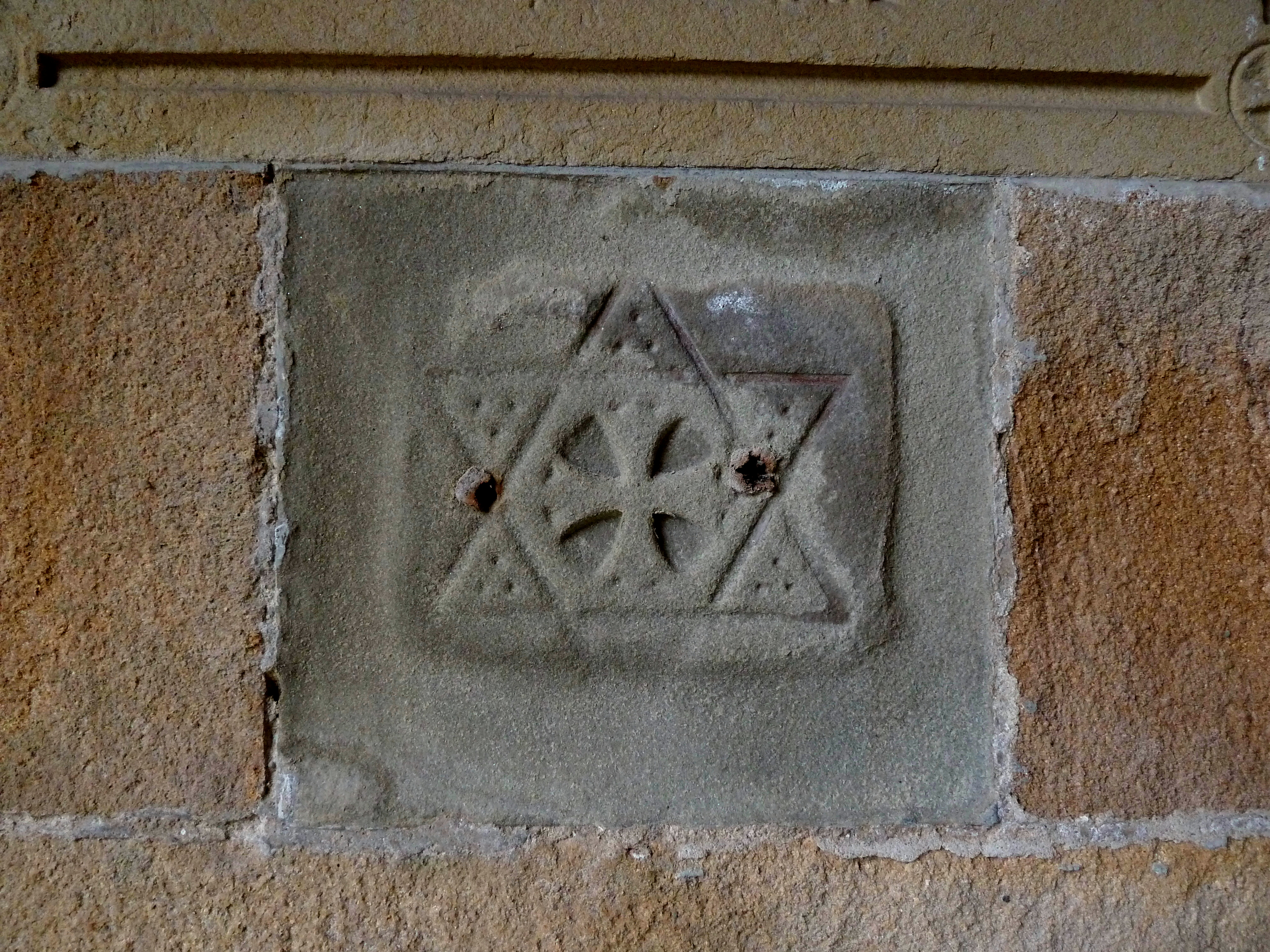
Consecration cross in porch

This is a Grade II listed building, designated as such on 4 February 1975. The three main reasons for listing are said by Historic England to be: the Gothic Revival style, the "circular bell tower reminiscent of Irish bell-houses", and the building as an example of a work by architect I.T. Shutt. It was built parallel to the Otley Road (B6162), so that it is not quite oriented east–west, i.e. the chancel points to east-north-east, and the west window looks west-south-west.

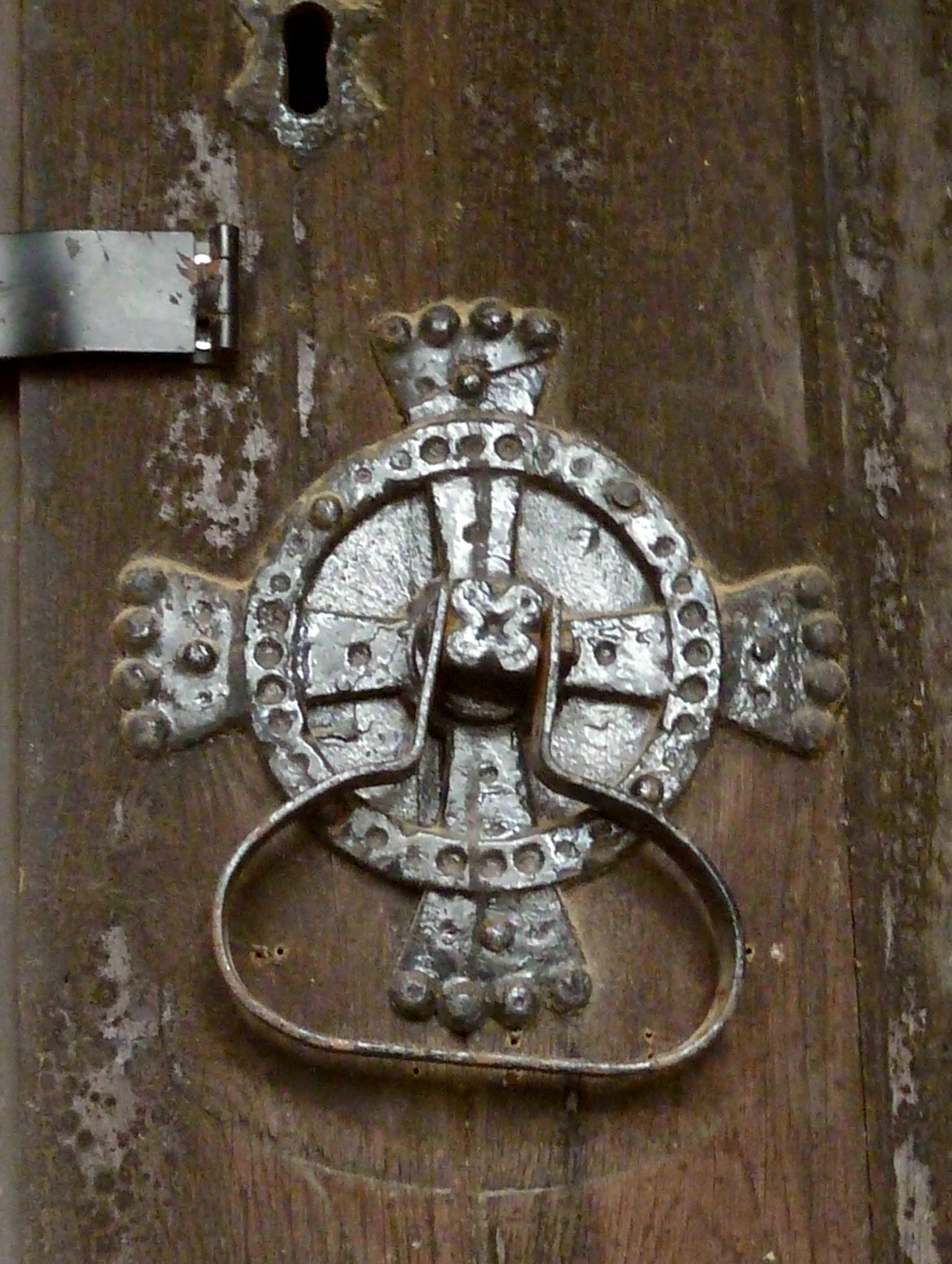
Door handle designed by A.H. Thompson

It is built of rusticated gritstone ashlar, and the roof is of Westmorland slate with a crested ridge and raised gables. The gabled porch opens into the south side of the nave, and as of 2014 the porch door had the original Arts and Crafts, hand-made and decorative, wrought iron hinges and door-handle plate. There is plate tracery on the east and west windows, and on the transept windows. However, there are paired cusped lancet windows in the nave, and single cusped lancets either side of the east window. The west window has a drip mould, and so does the porch, but these are omitted from the other windows. The chancel has a normal ridge roof, then a polygonal apse with a gable protruding from it, and this construction allows for an east wall which is flat and high enough for the east window.

=== Tower ===
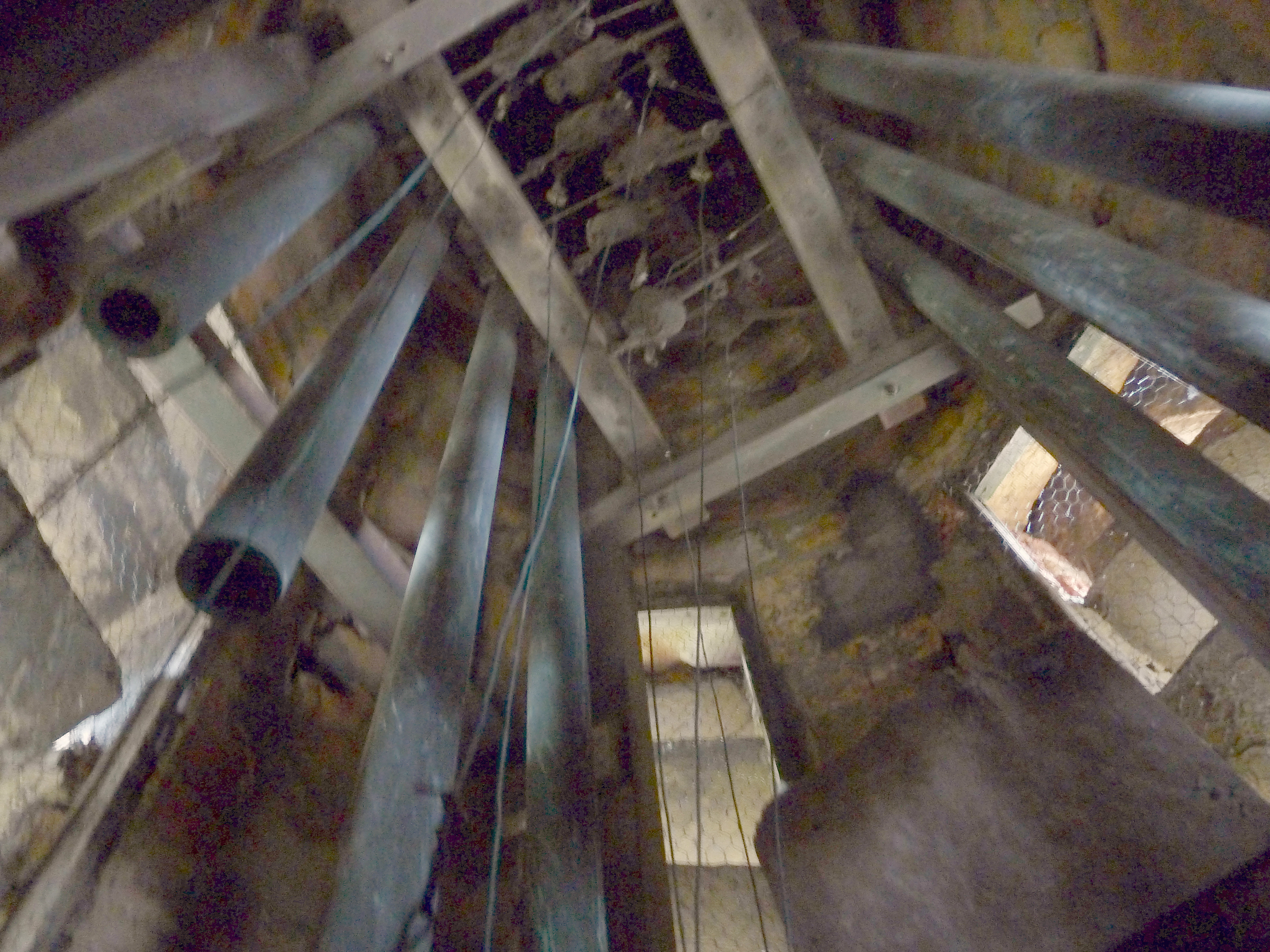
Tubular bells in tower

The three-stage, circular bell tower on the south-west corner of the church is attached to the building, but appears from some viewpoints to stand separately. The long first stage has lancet windows at the bottom, and quatrefoil windows level with the nave roof. The first and second stages are divided by a sloping course supported by bud corbels and surmounted by four trefoil gablets, or small decorative gables, set above the four quatrefoil windows. The second stage is the belfry originally designed for a single bell, and this has lancet windows with decorative wooden louvres or abat-sons. The spire is built of stone laid in decorative bands. It now contains a carillon of eight tubular bells donated in 1914 by the family of Melville M. Walker, controlled at ground level by an Ellacombe chiming rack. There is no public access to the tower.

== Building interior ==
=== Nave ===
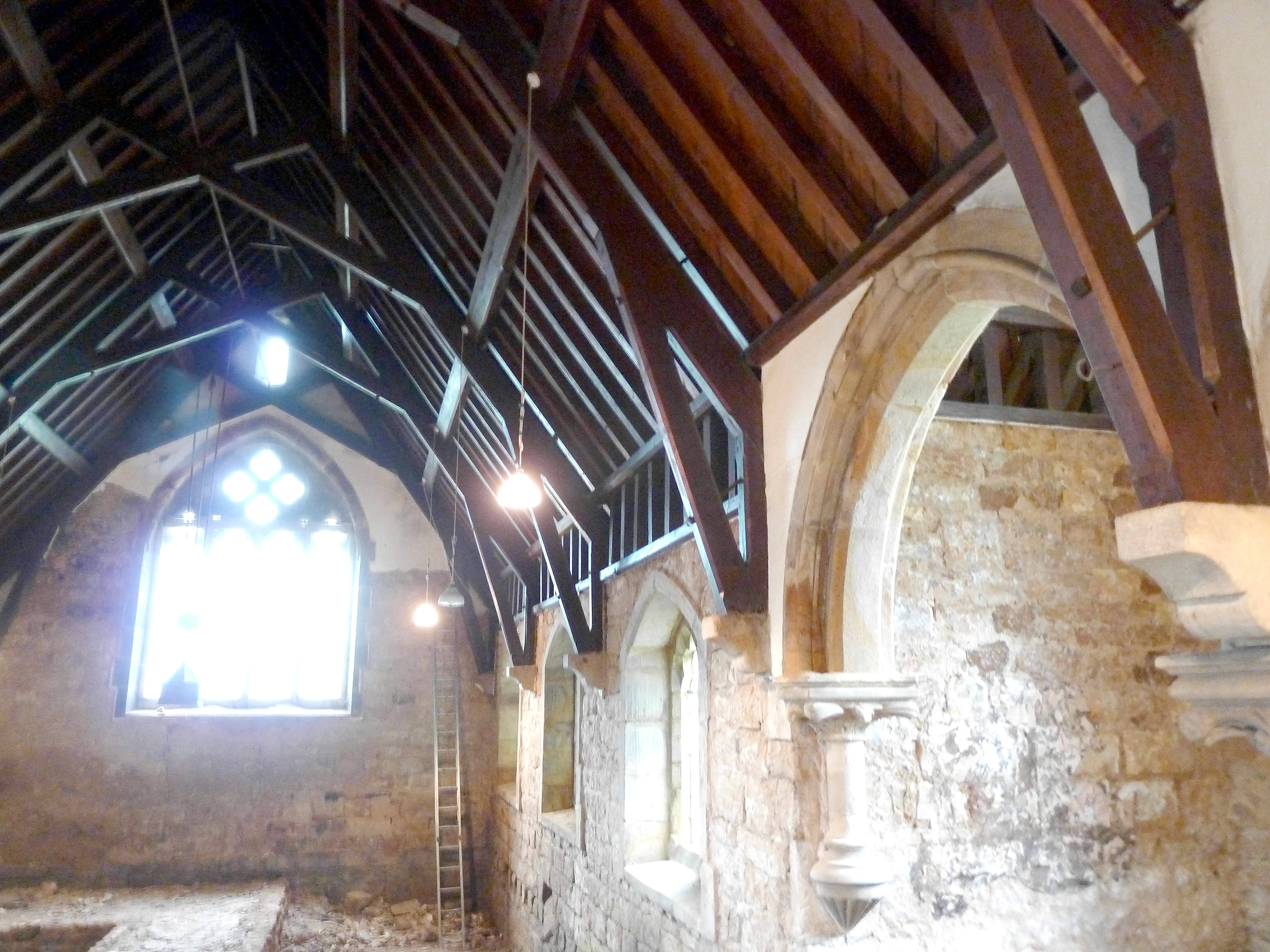
Nave during restoration 2014

It was designed for a congregation of 230. It is a three-bay nave, that is, there are three spaces between the main timber roof trusses. This scissor braced truss roof is supported on hand-carved but fairly plain corbels.

There are two tiny transepts, and the entrance of each is supported by a central pillar dividing arches echoing the design of the chancel arch and its pillared corbels. Above the transept windows and west windows are ventilation slits which are now glazed: a reminder that this is a cemetery chapel. One window of the south wall and two windows on the north wall of the nave contain stained glass. When the building was listed in 1975 it still had the original stained deal pews, but during the restoration of 2014 some of these were removed, and some were stacked in the chancel. The Church of England has removed the "beautiful font of Harehills stone ... of elegant design and artistically wrought," although as of 2014 the lid still existed, hanging on its pulley. Both font and lid were carved and installed in 1871.

=== Chancel ===
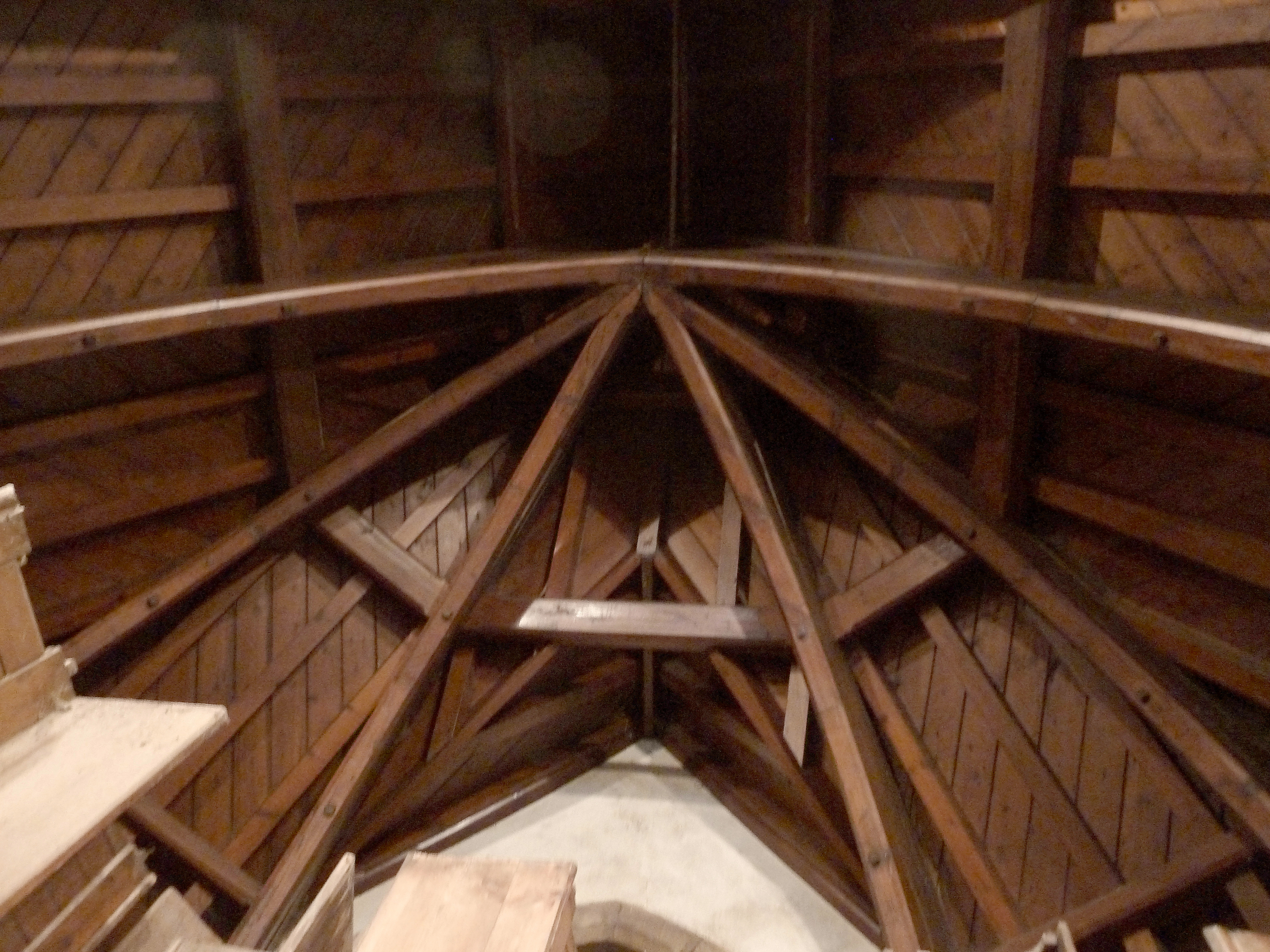
Chancel roof trusses

The chancel arch is in doubled form, having an inner and an outer structure. The inner structure is supported on pillared corbels: a half-capital carved with acanthus leaves is supported on a short, smooth, round, half-column which is supported in turn on a corbel in the form of an inverted, fluted half-cone. The chancel window has three lights with a lancet window on either side; all filled with stained glass. The vestry is attached to its south wall, and the organ chamber is a lean-to opening from the chancel's north wall and connecting to the north transept via a door. The hardwood choir stalls, the south pulpit, the lectern and the communion rail were made by Thompson of Kilburn (1876–1955) and are not original to the building. The remaining north pulpit is original as designed and commissioned by the architects.

== Closure and re-use ==
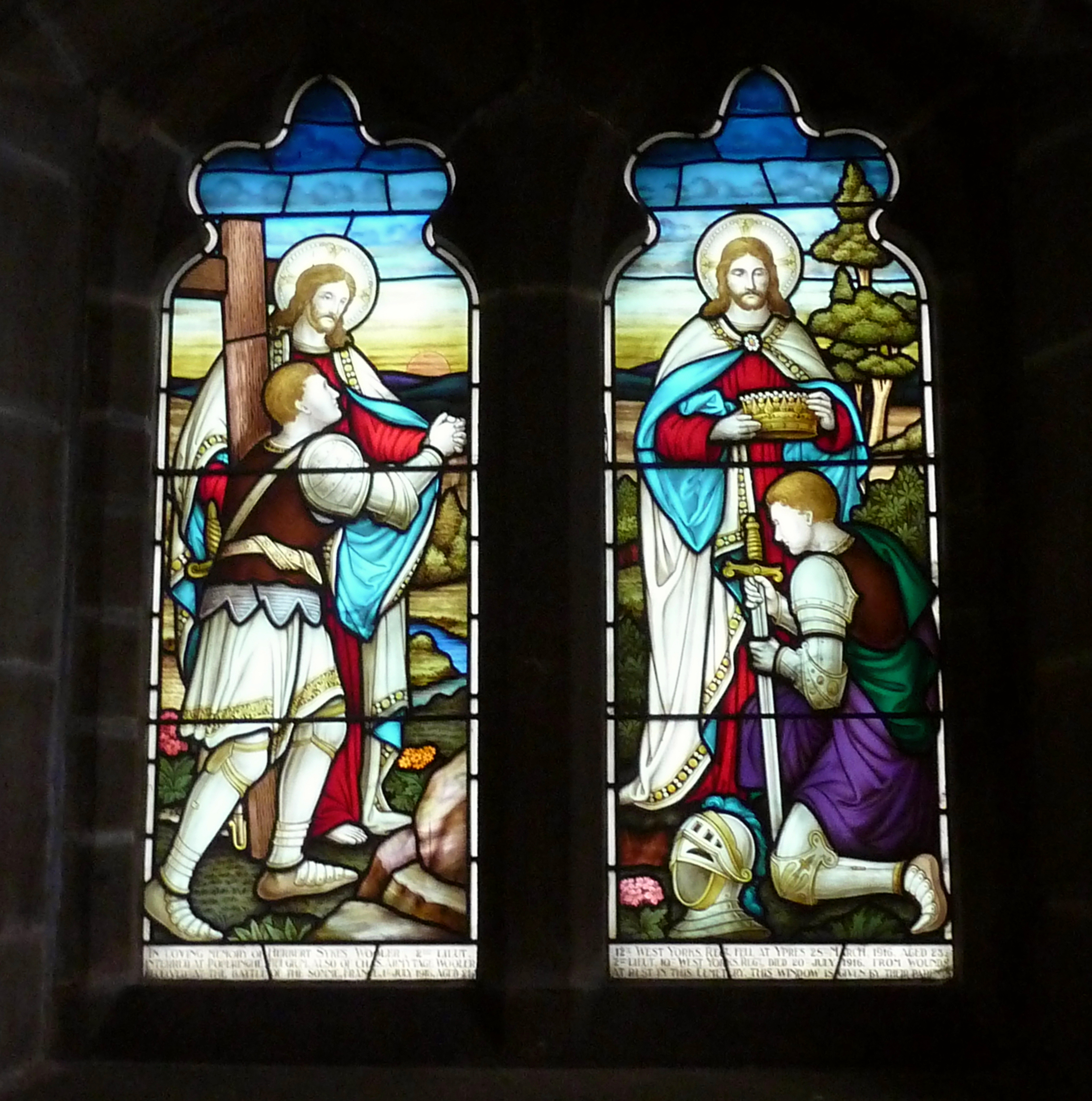
1916 window

By November 2006 the building had been shut down due to wet and dry rot, and a meeting was held with regard to its restoration as an "important landmark." In 2009 the building developed structural problems and was declared unsafe and services ceased. The parish was taken over by Kairos Network Church, which is a Bishop Mission Order associated with St Mary's parish, Harrogate. By 2014 the building had been deconsecrated and sold to A. Vause & Son, funeral directors, who were intending to restore the interior for use as a chapel of rest. These plans did not come to fruition and in April 2023 North Yorkshire County Council granted permission to convert the church to a private dwelling.

== Cemetery ==
The cemetery is under the control of Harrogate Borough Council; Like the chapel, it lies on land donated by the Earl of Harewood in 1889. It was consecrated by the Bishop of Ripon on 3 October 1871.

== See also ==
- Listed buildings in Harrogate (Harlow Moor Ward)
