= Alfred Hill Thompson =

English architect

Alfred Hill Thompson A.R.I.B.A.
- Born: 1839; Leeds, England
- Died: 19 May 1874 (aged 34–35); Knaresborough, England
- Occupation: Architect
- Practice: (1860–1870) A.H. Thompson (1870–1871) Shutt & Thompson (1871–1874) A.H. Thompson
- Buildings: Trinity Chapel, Rawdon, 1868; All Saints, Harlow Hill, 1871; Wesleyan Chapel Rodley, 1871; Methodist Chapel Calverley, 1874

Alfred Hill Thompson, ARIBA (1839 – 19 May 1874) was an English architect in the Gothic Revival and Arts and Crafts styles, who specialised in small schools and chapels in the Yorkshire area. In partnership with Isaac Thomas Shutt he co-designed the Church of All Saints, Harlow Hill, completed in 1871.

== Personal life ==
Alfred Hill Thompson, ARIBA, was born in Leeds in 1839. His father John Thompson (b.1816) was a china and glass dealer, and hairdresser whose wife was Elizabeth Thompson (b.1814). In 1851 the family was living at 134 Upper Kirkgate, Leeds, Thompson was aged 13, the eldest of five children. On Saturday 9 May 1863 he married Margaret Mitchell (1845–1896), daughter of barrister John Gilmour, in Islington. At that time, he was already an ARIBA, and was working from an office in Victoria Chambers, Leeds. In 1871 he was an architect aged 32, living at 95 Tonbridge Street with his Scottish wife Margaret Mitchell Thompson and their son aged 7 years, who had been born in London. With them were four lodgers and a servant. By 1871 he was working from an office in Park Square, Leeds.

He died in Knaresborough on 19 May 1874, aged 35 years. His brief obituary notice describes him as an architect of Leeds and Chapeltown. His wife Margaret married again to Roland or Rowland Gregory Flockton (1831–1918), a clerk, in Kensington in 1881. Margaret died in Epsom in 1896, aged 51.

== Works ==
=== Zion Congregational Chapel Schools, Morley, 1865 ===
In 1865 two schools of his design "in stone and red brick" were accepted as an "ornament to the neighbourhood." If this was the structure in Queens Street, then the schools were demolished after 1965. (Note: Leodis: Queen Street, looking south. The schools were located to the right of the picture. You can see the top of Zion Chapel (now demolished) on the right.) (Note: Leodis Image showing side of Zion Sunday school building (right) in 1965 before it was demolished) Alternatively, it may have been the Zion Sunday school in Zion Yard, off Wesley Street, Morley.

=== Wesleyan School and Chapel, Rawdon, 1868 ===
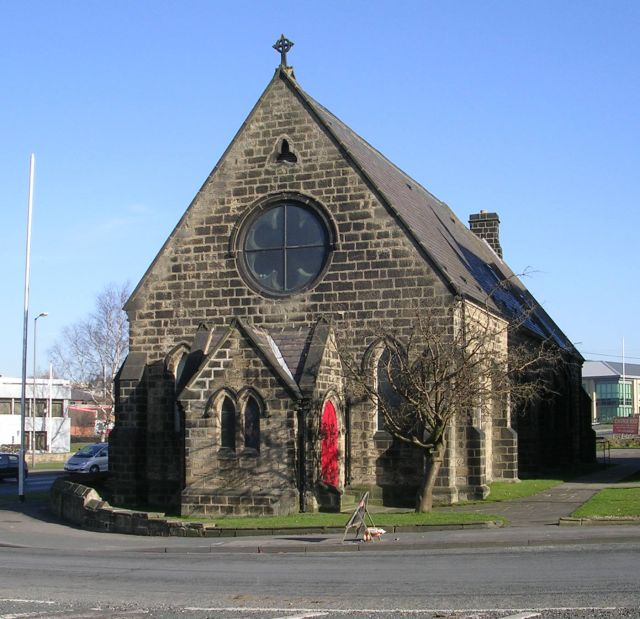
Trinity Sunday School, Rawdon

This Sunday School and Chapel are Grade II listed buildings. This was an 1868 complete build of a Sunday school then known as the Wesleyan School, and an 1868 enlargement of the 1846 Benton Chapel or Congregational Church at Rawdon. Thompson designed the Wesleyan school for 300 children, which was completed in May 1868 at a cost of over £900, and the enlargement of the adjoining chapel which was to be completed later at a cost of £4090. In 1972 the Benton Chapel was renamed the Trinity Church because it was thenceforth occupied by Baptists, Congregationalists and Methodists working together.

=== Church of All Saints, Harlow Hill, 1870–1871 ===
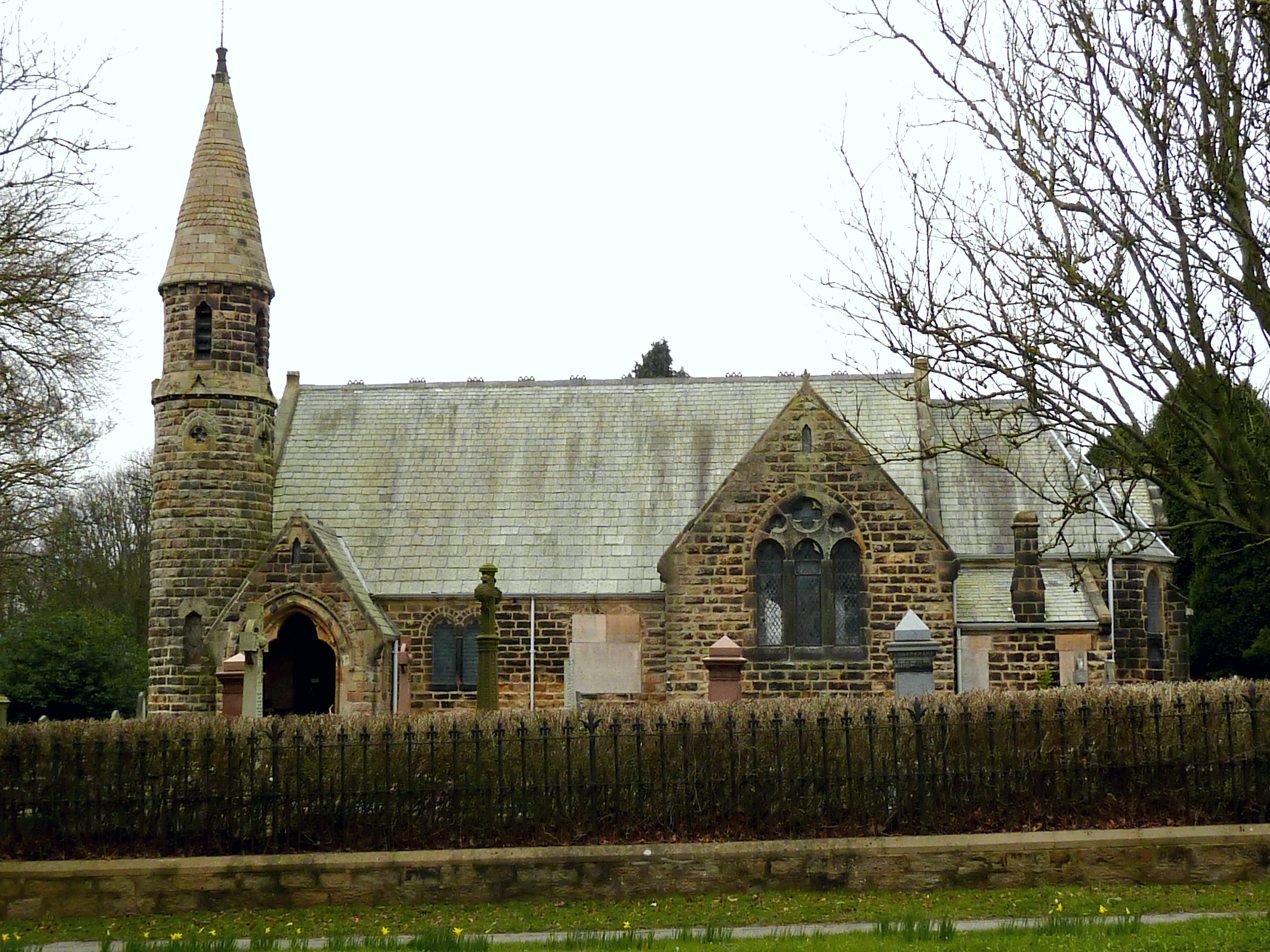
All Saints, Harlow Hill

This is a Grade II listed building, designed by Thompson in partnership with Isaac Thomas Shutt (1818–1879). The main structure is built of rusticated gritstone ashlar. The building is constructed parallel to the Otley Road on its south side, so that the plan is not quite east–west. It has a "circular bell tower reminiscent of Irish bell-houses" transepts and an apsoidal chancel. The vestry is in the south transept, and the organ chamber in the north. The east window is in the apse, inside a low gable which runs down from a hipped roof. The lancet windows high in the gables, over the west and transept windows, were probably once for ventilation but are now glazed.

=== Wesleyan (now Trinity) chapel and Sunday school, Rodley, 1871 ===
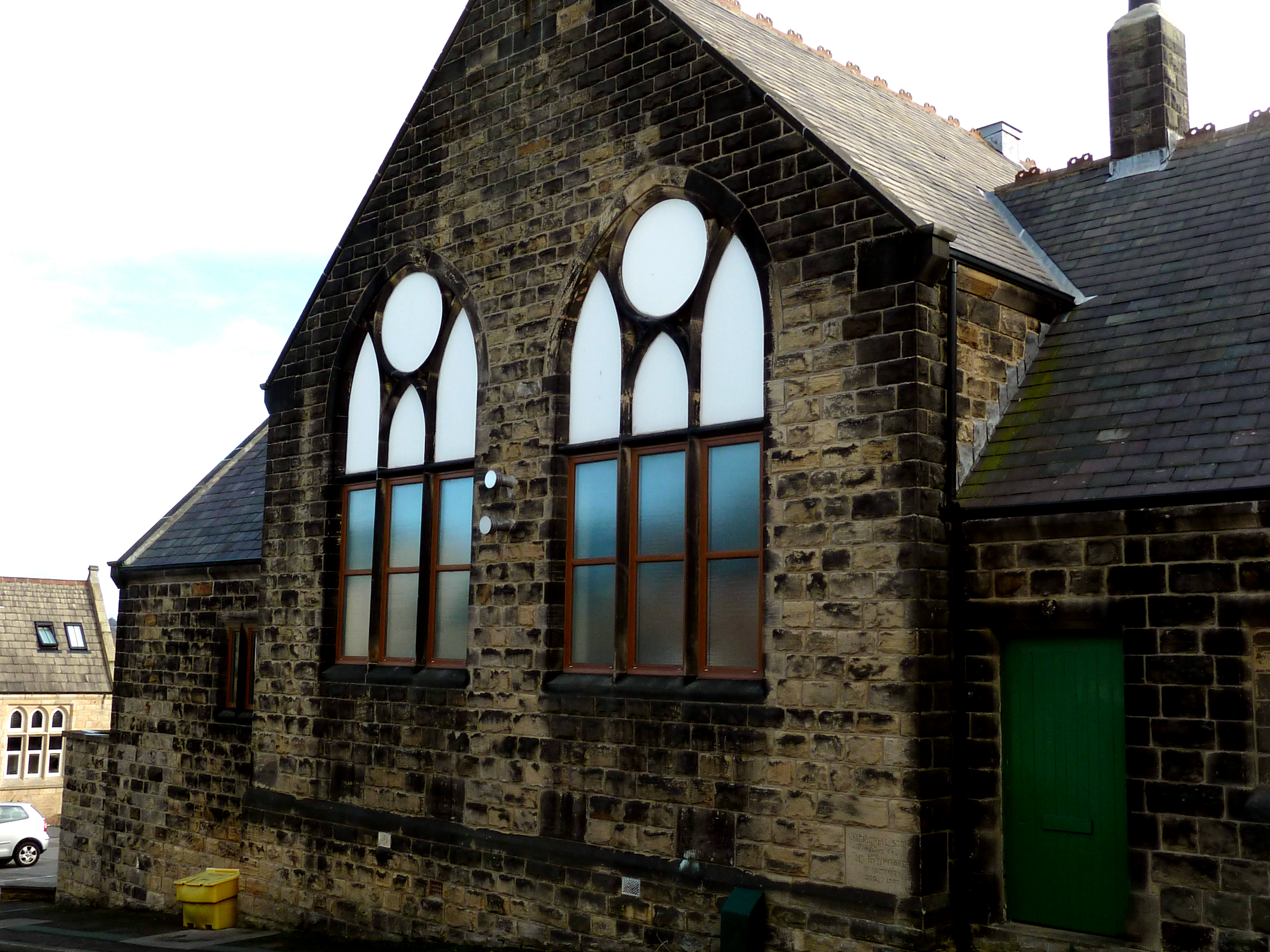
The Church in Rodley

This is an unlisted building. Thompson designed a Wesleyan Gothic Revival chapel between Wesley Terrace and Wesley Street, Rodley, West Yorkshire, originally known as the Wesleyan Chapel at Rodley, and funds of £1500 were being raised for it in May 1871. The chapel would accommodate 250 people, a chapel-keeper's residence beneath; (Note: Leodis: Wesley Street Methodist Church View (1) of chapel before it was demolished) (Note: Leodis: Wesley Street Methodist Church (2) view (2) of chapel before it was demolished) the Sunday school would be built next door. (Note: Leodis: Wesley Street School View of the current chapel building, when it was still a school) (Note: Leodis: Wesley Street Methodist Sunday School Before it became the Church at Rodley) (Note: Leodis: Rodley County Primary School, Town Street This backed onto the (now demolished) chapel, but was built in 1874, not by Thompson) The chapel had a James Jepson Binns organ. The chapel was demolished around 1979 and is now a car park for the Sunday school building, which was converted into the current church. This old school building now has a hung ceiling, concealing the tops of the tall windows and the interior roof structure. It was renamed the Rodley Ecumenical Centre in 1973 and is now known as The Church in Rodley.

=== Various villas, Leeds area, 1871 ===
In January 1871 Thompson advertised from his office at 14 Park Square, Leeds, for tenders to complete his plans for a villa in Chapeltown, Leeds. In the same month, he advertised for tenders for five houses on the Morley Hall Estate, Morley, West Yorkshire. In June and July 1871, he was calling similarly for tenders for completing a villa or villas in Calverley, near Leeds.

=== Park Primitive Methodist Chapel, Calverley 1872–1874 ===
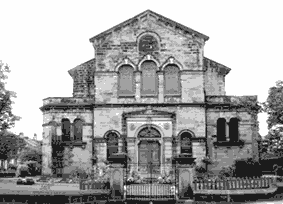
Calverley Methodist Chapel

This is a Grade II listed building. Built on the corner of the A657 (Carr Road) and Chapel Street, Calverley, this "very handsome" chapel was completed in 1874 for $2,400, (Note: My primitive Methodists: Calverley Primitive Methodist Chapel This site states an opening date of 1872, which disagrees with the original 1874 Bradford Observer report) in the Italian style to replace a "very humble structure" built in 1840. It had a pediment with "projecting wings" on the front, and tiled floors inside. It had two front doors and two staircases, and at the back a one-storey school room, a kitchen and a vestry. It had a white-painted gallery with gilded mouldings, stained pitch pine pews and a platform-pulpit. The ceiling had a plain border, but "richly-moulded" centre-pieces to hang the chandeliers from, and the windows had stained-glass borders. It was paid for by subscription and bazaars. According to Historic England, at the time of listing (1986) it still had its pews, gallery and ceiling bosses.
