= Royal Pump Room, Harrogate =

Royal Pump Room
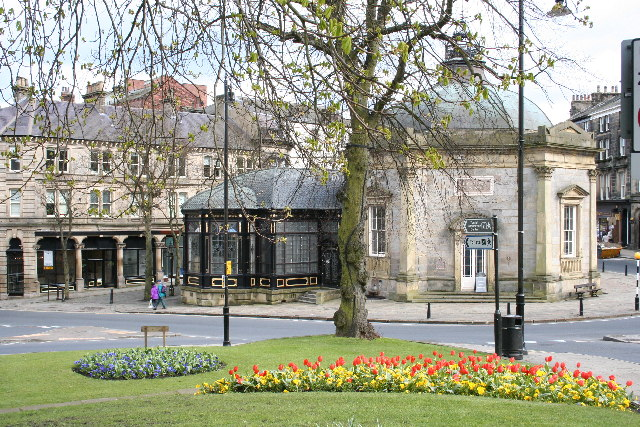
- The Royal Pump Room from the north-west

- Location of the Pump Room in North Yorkshire
- Established: 1953
- Location: Harrogate, North Yorkshire, England
- Coordinates: 53.9935°N 1.5467°W
- Type: Local museum
- Key holdings: Anubis mask, artefacts and gifts from Russian Royalty. The Holland-Child Collection of predominantly Leeds made Creamware ceramics. Artefacts from Roman, Etruscan, Ancient Greek, Babylonian and South American cultures
- Collections: Archaeology Social history
- Collection size: 20,000 items
- Owner: North Yorkshire Council
- Website: Museum website

The Royal Pump Room is a Grade II* listed building in Harrogate, North Yorkshire, England. Today it houses the town's museum – operated by North Yorkshire Council. It was formerly a spa water pump house. It is located in Crown Place in the western part of Harrogate town centre, opposite the town's Valley Gardens park. It is bounded by two streets, Crescent Road and Royal Parade. Today, the Pump Room consists of both the original 1842 stone rotunda and a glazed annexe which was opened in 1913. The Pump Room offered guests of the town an all weather facility where they could drink sulphur water which was pumped on site from a natural spring known as the Old Sulphur Well. The building also had a social element to it as it provided guests with a place to meet friends and get to know others.

== The museum ==
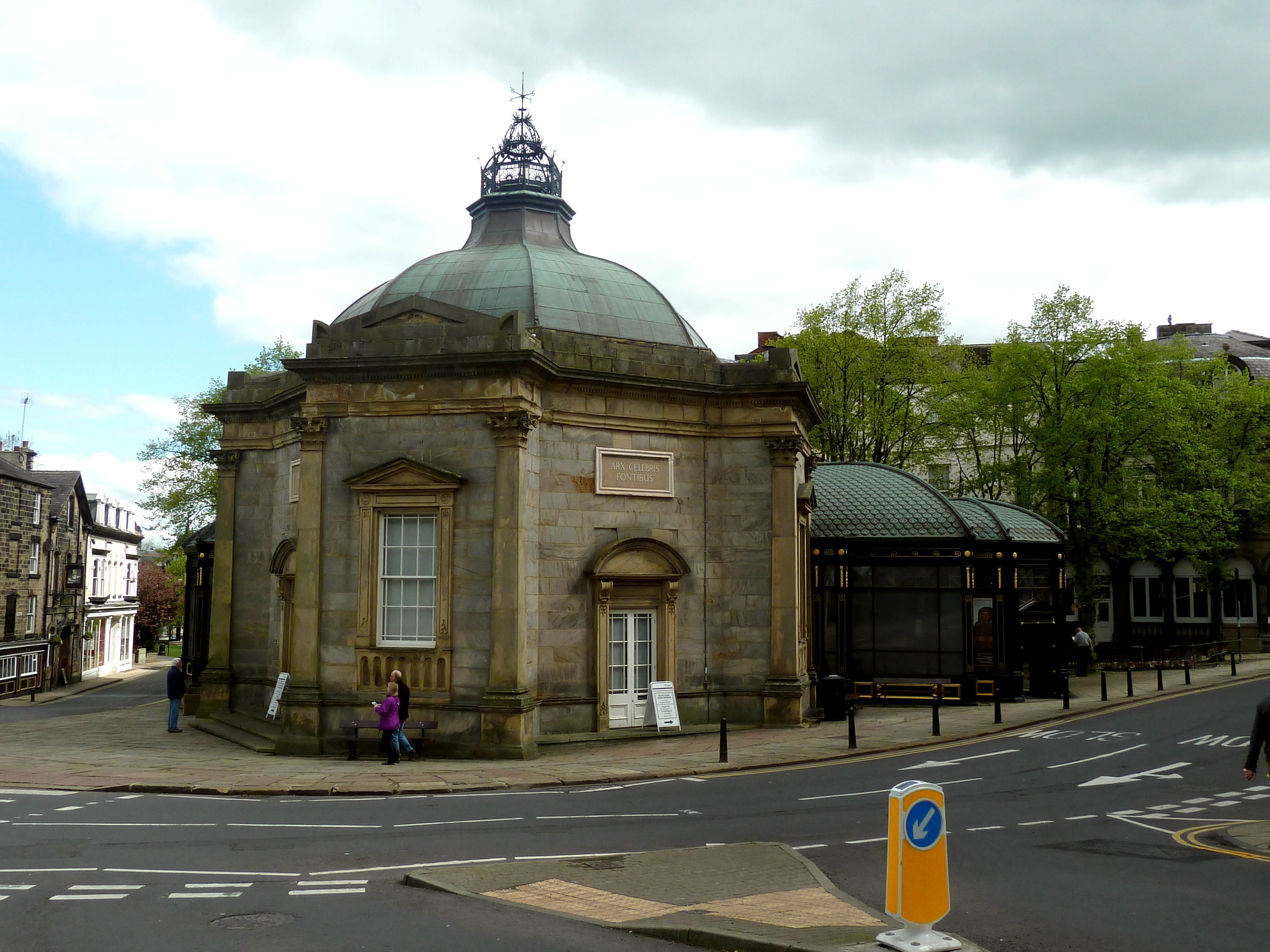
The Royal Pump Room

The Pump Room, and its later Annexe, were renovated in the early 1950s and it first opened as the new town museum in 1953. Today The Royal Pump Room Museum is owned and operated by North Yorkshire Council. The museum underwent extensive renovations between 1985 and 1987. During the work many features of the buildings including the main building and Annexe's copper roof were restored. In addition, the Old Sulphur Well's wellhead and the surviving original water serving counter were restored. The 1980s overhaul also created new exhibition areas and improved the on-site facilities.

The majority of the museum tells the story of Harrogate as a spa and a centre for rest and recuperation. The council-owned collection now consists of approximately 20,000 items. The first donations and endowments came from local private collections and some items were first donated to Harrogate Corporation in the 1850s.

Amongst the exhibits relating to Harrogate as a spa town are a number of recreated treatment rooms using salvaged original fixtures. These dioramas recreate the Hydrotherapy facilities, such as the Vichy bath rooms that were to be found in the nearby Royal Baths. Visitors can also see a wheeled mahogany bath which was once used for giving sulphurous peat baths. It was discovered intact during the 1970s despite being left abandoned for many years and buried near the site of The Royal Baths.

The museum's 19th century Bath chair was still used by bath chair proprietor Mr Robinson until he retired in 1931. These wheeled covered chairs were once a common sight in 19th century Harrogate and they were even fairly common in the 1920s. Bath chairs could be hired by guests from a rank of chairs and then bath chair men would push visitors from the rank to the various hotels and spa buildings.

Recently a number of glass Hamilton style bottles – often known as 'torpedo' bottles – which all bare the inscription "bottled at the Royal Pump Room, Harrogate", were donated to the museum. Very few of these unusually shaped Victorian bottles have survived. They now form part of the display of the Pump Room's bottling room. This display serves as a reminder that there was a wider social and economic significance of the Pump Room. Strong Sulphur Water was once bottled and exported as medicinal spring water for consumption throughout the country.

The museum also regularly displays a selection of period costumes from its sizeable and historically significant collection of clothing. In 2014, dresses from the museum's collections appeared on show in the Classical Dress Timeless Style exhibition which explored the influence of fashions of Ancient Greece and other aspects of the Classical World on dress makers from the 19th and 20th centuries.

Another important element of the museum's displays are artefacts from the Ancient World. The museum is noted for its Ancient Egyptian and Ancient Greek artefacts which were collected by local antiquarians such as Robert Ogden and the Kent family of Tatefield Hall which is located near Beckwithshaw. The Egyptology collection includes a well-preserved sarcophagus, a unique cartonnage mask of Anubis, Stele gravestones, pre-dynastic pottery and other artefacts from later periods of Ancient Egypt.

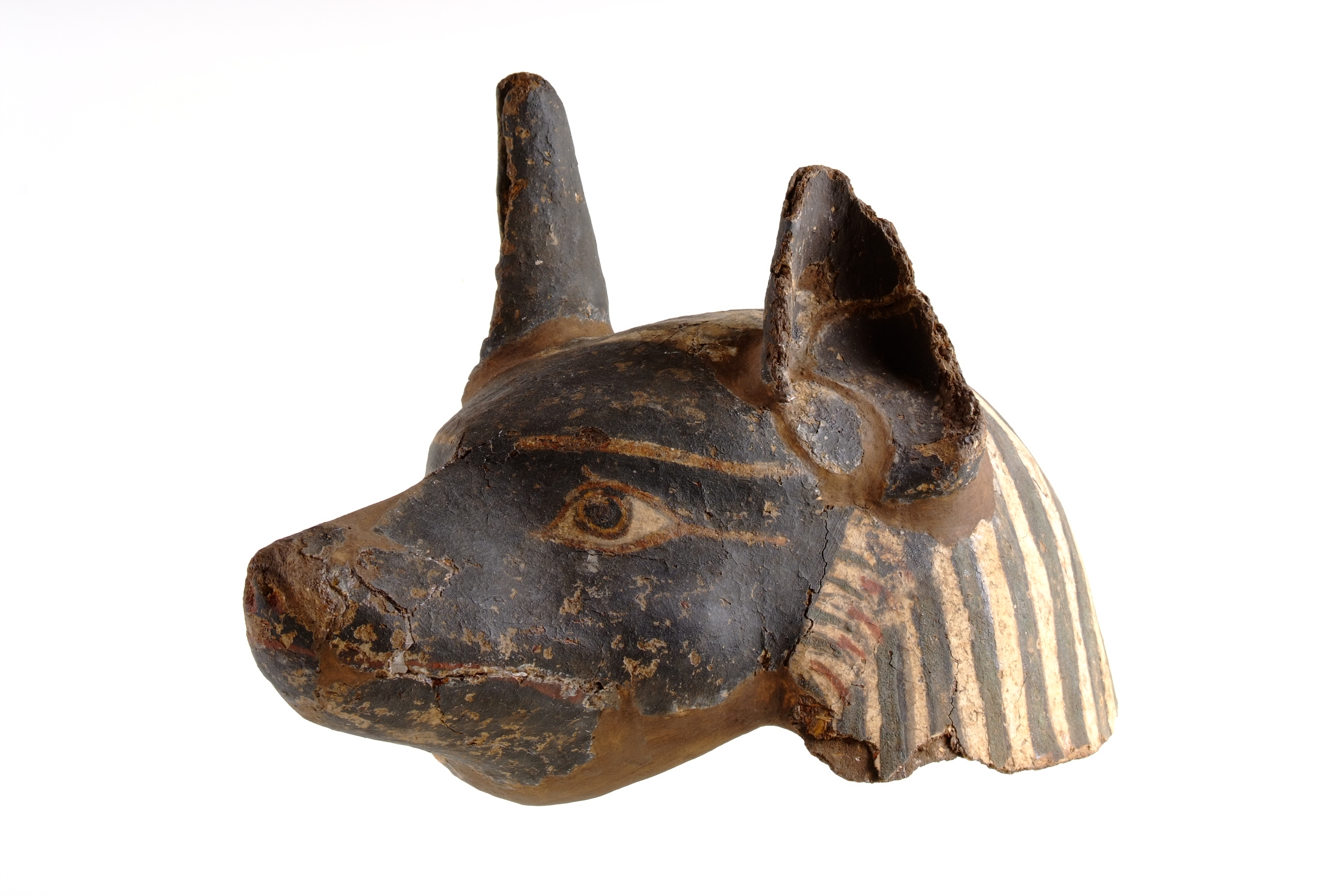
Anubis Mask from Harrogate – left three quarter profile – HARGM10686 02

=== Exhibitions at the museum ===
There is a regular programme of special exhibitions. These make use of the core council-owned collection and loaned items. In 2014, a Great War centenary exhibition was held which featured numerous artefacts and personal memorabilia belonging to local people who served in the conflict. In late 2013, the Royal Pump Room displayed some of the costumes from ITV's period drama Downton Abbey. The exhibition, which ran from October to December 2013, proved to be an outstanding success.

=== Children and young people and the museum ===
The museum welcomes numerous school parties from around Yorkshire. There is a well-established education programme for the various subjects covered by the National Curriculum. The museum provides workshops on subjects such as Egyptology, toys through time and also local history. The nearby Mercer Art Gallery houses the school activity room. Costumed period re-enactors sometimes interpret a particular period of history for schoolchildren.

For families with children there is also a children's activity area, that includes colouring sheets, loanable activity backpacks and other trail and quiz sheets. During the summer holidays there are special object handling sessions and other educational activities for children.

== The Pump Room's history and historical context ==
=== Discovery of mineral waters in Harrogate ===
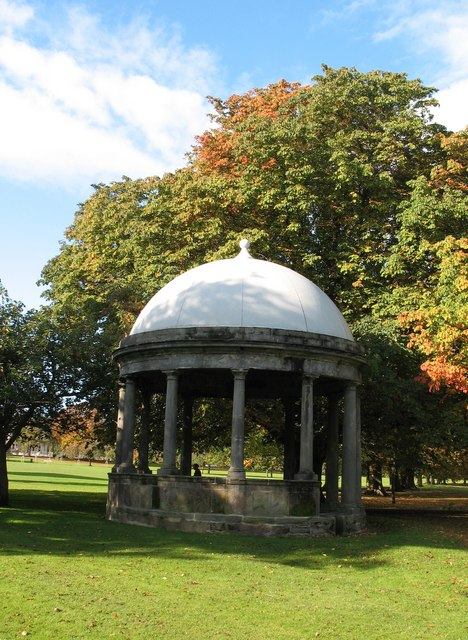
The Tewit Well, Harrogate's first well. Now covered with the Pump Room's original rotunda

The Tewit Well on the Stray was discovered by William Slingsby (uncle of Sir William Slingsby) in 1596.

Edmund Deane a physician of York provides evidence that by 1626 the waters of Harrogate's Tewit Well were being used for medicinal purposes. He referred to the well as "The English Spa". He compared the waters of the Tewit Well with those of Spa in present-day Belgium, which even by Deane's day, was already a popular place where spring water was being consumed for health reasons.

=== History of the site of the Royal Pump Room ===
The waters from the natural spring upon which the Pump Room is built upon contains the greatest amount of sulphur of all of Harrogate's many water springs. The water from the Old Sulphur Well was termed Strong Sulphur Water to distinguish it from sulphurous waters from the town's other wells.

Betty Lupton (c.1760–1843), dispensed Strong Sulphur Water from a well for approximately six decades at the Pump Room's present site. She retired in 1843, just as the Pump Room was completed. According to a contemporary newspaper obituary, she died on 22 August 1843 and was said to be 83 years old. It is known that in 1837, she was given the honorary title 'The Queen of the Well'. This title was held by several different women who were all water servers at the Old Sulphur Well. Water servers such as Betty were elected and then crowned each May. It is unclear when this tradition finally ended, but it is known a Mrs Anne Watson, held the title 'The Queen of the Well' after Betty Lupton had died.

In the present day museum visitors can look down into the Pump Room's basement. There they can see an 18th century stone well-head for the Old Sulphur Well. It is of an unusual design and features arched openings with a tented roof structure which apparently was to protect the marble basin underneath. It is thought the marble basin was an original feature of the well head.

In 1986 another long disused well shaft, which was thought to also date from the 18th century, was rediscovered and reopened by workmen during the refurbishment the Royal Pump Room museum.

=== The original 1842 building of the Royal Pump Room ===
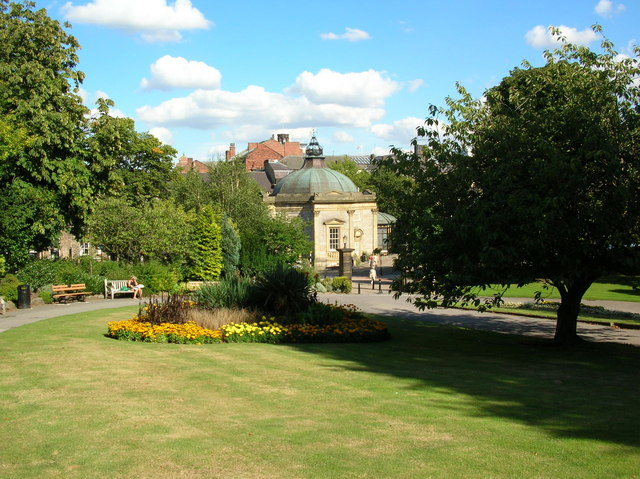
The Royal Pump Room, view across the park

The octagonal colonnaded building was designed by Isaac Thomas Shutt whose family owned the Swan Hotel. It was designed to accommodate 150 people. Apparently Shutt's design was not supported by all of Harrogate's Commissioners and four prominent builders and innkeepers of the town resigned in protest of Shutt's design being chosen.

The building was completed in 1842 and the project is said to have costed £2,249 and 7 shillings. According to the British National Archive's online historical Currency Converter, this sum of money in 1840 would be the equivalent of spending £99,196 in 2005 Currency Converter (1270–1970).

The Pump Room was the first project of the newly formed Harrogate Improvement Commissioners, whose aim was to provide a suitable building to house the Old Sulphur Well. The previous structure that was built on the site in the first decade of the 19th century was dismantled and re-erected over the Tewit Well.

The Pump Room has four projecting side bays with windows and Corinthian pillars. On one of the walls of the building there is an inscribed panel bearing the town's Latin motto Arx celebris fontibus which can translate as "A citadel noted for its springs". The octagonal ogee dome is covered with copper tiles which replaced the original lead roof. In the centre of the roof there is an architectural feature known as a lantern which lets light down into the building.

=== Drinking the waters and the outside tap ===
In the heyday of the Pump Room, guests would arrive early in the morning from 7 am until about 9.30 am in order to drink one or two glasses of water. This was all done before they had any breakfast.

After entering the building they would pay an attendant for their sulphur water. The water was traditionally served in glasses from a wooden counter. Visitors to the pump room were charged for drinking its water inside the building. Hollins' Handbook for Harrogate stated that an Act of Parliament governed the price of the water from the Pump Room. For an individual it would cost 1 shilling to drink sulphur water at the Pump Room for a week. A family could drink the waters at the Pump Room for the same duration at a cost of 4 shillings. However, legislation from as early as 1841 stated that Strong Sulphur Water was to be made available for free to those who could not afford it.

The Harrogate Improvement Commissioners Board's 1841 Harrogate Act established the principle that the poor should not be excluded from the perceived medicinal benefits of Harrogate's sulphur water. In order to conform to the act the Pump Room provided an outside tap which anyone could use at any time. After 9.30 am the Pump Room's attendants stopped serving well water inside the building. From this time onward the outside tap was the only source of well water. In the early days of the building an attendant supervised the tap. This tap still exists today and it still works, although it is not recommended to try the water, due to the health risks involved.

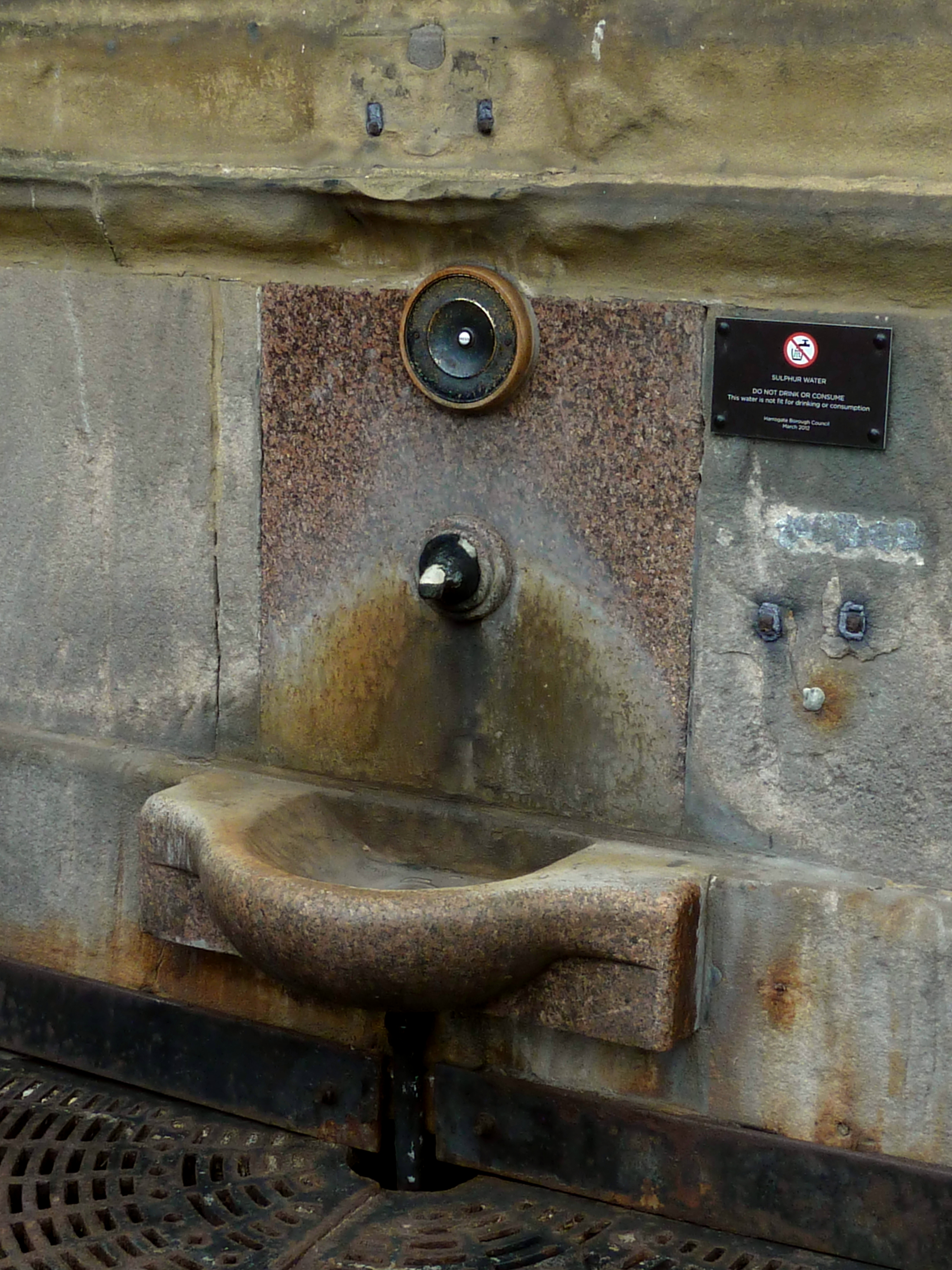
The Pump Room's outside tap with sulphur deposits and staining visible and health warning sign

=== The Pump Room becomes fashionable ===
During the heyday of the Pump Room music recitals were often held inside the building to entertain visitors.

People from many different social backgrounds would travel from various parts of Great Britain and even Europe, to drink the pump room's water. In the 19th century sulphur water was seen as a means to effectively alleviate the symptoms of illnesses such as gout and lumbago. Drinking the water at the Royal Pump Room was seen as an integral part of what later became known as "The Harrogate cure". During their stay in the town, guests also visited Harrogate's Royal Baths to partake in various other treatments such as hot mineral water bath treatments, mud and sulphur rich peat baths to try to improve their health. In addition, rest, exercise, and relaxation became an integral part of the Harrogate cure.

=== Increased popularity of Harrogate Spa Water and the Royal Pump Room ===
The number of people recorded as having drunk Harrogate's spa waters rose at an astonishing rate during the mid 19th century. For example, it was believed during 1842 Harrogate had received 3,778 visitors who had come to drink the water. By 1867 this figure stood at 11,626. The Pump Room is said to have regularly seen about 15,000 visitors a year through its doors at the peak of its popularity during the late 19th century and early 20th century.

=== The 1913 Annexe building ===
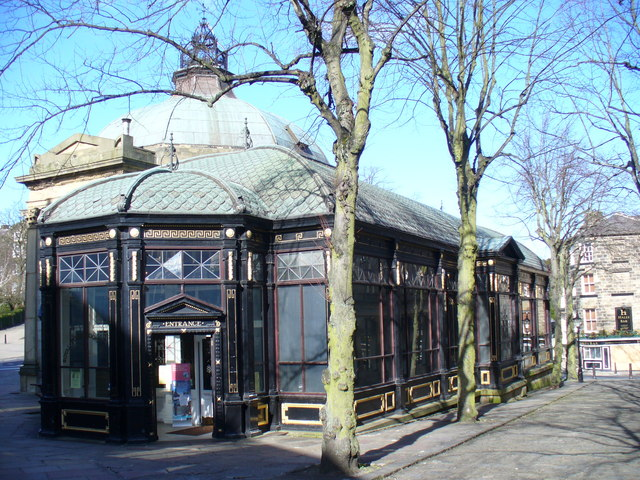
Royal Pump Room Annexe's exterior

The continued popularity of Harrogate's spa waters created the need to expand the Pump Room building. By the 1900s, the Royal Pump Room was experiencing overcrowding on a regular basis. Initially a small temporary structure was erected alongside the 1842 building in an attempt to alleviate the overcrowding. This measure apparently proved to be unsatisfactory to visitors and failed to solve the problem. After much public debate on how to deal with the problem, Harrogate Corporation decided to add a permanent extension which would be connected to the 1842 building. In around 1912–13 the new annexe, which was designed by Leonard Clarke (architect), was built. Clarke's elegant design was fully glazed and had a roof tiled with ornate copper fishtail tiles which complement the original building's copper tiles. David Burnett, the then current Lord Mayor of London who also later became the 1st Baronet Burnett of Selborne House, travelled to Harrogate to conduct the annexe's opening ceremony on 7 June 1913. Sadly and somewhat ironically barely a year after the annexe's opening the First World War had broken out. This resulted in a dramatic and rapid fall in the visitor numbers who were coming to Harrogate as a whole. The Pump Room never recovered from this event and visitor numbers never went back to their pre First World War levels following the return of peace.

=== The later decades of the Royal Pump Room and closure ===
Although Harrogate had 259,000 visitors in 1925, who were all recorded as having come to Harrogate with the specific intention to drink the town's spa waters, the Royal Pump Room and other such wells began experiencing a decline in popularity as the interwar period progressed. The Great Depression and the economic hardships that followed in its wake had a major effect on visitor numbers to Harrogate's spa rooms. In addition, changes in medical thinking and social customs in this period resulted in fewer people coming to 'take the waters' in Harrogate. Yet in August 1939, just weeks before the German invasion of Poland, the Pump Room was still attracting a large number of customers. It was arranged with the Corporation that between 7 am and 9.30 am, the roads outside the building were to be closed to allow guests to safely cross the road with their sulphur water glasses to reach tables placed opposite from the Pump Room. Newspaper vendors brought cartloads of newspapers to the Pump Room to sell to customers.

These two aspects of the Pump Room's day-to-day operation, which can be seen in a silent film shot by Charles R. H. Pickard's photographic firm of Leeds, show that even in 1939 the Royal Pump Room was still an important visitor attraction and source of revenue for Harrogate Corporation and other parties. It is understood that sometime around the outbreak of the Second World War, the Pump Room was purposefully closed down. Possibly this was due to the government order that forbade the operation of public buildings where large numbers of people could gather e.g. theatres and cinemas.

After the end of the war, in spite of the Pump Room's continued appeal to certain visitors to Harrogate, the decision was taken to decommission the building's water pumping equipment. After the Pump Room had been closed to the public the building served as a storehouse and also as a cafe/restaurant for short periods of time. However, by the early 1950s it was decided that the Pump Room would be turned into Harrogate's new museum.

=== Notable people who visited the Royal Pump Room as a Spa Room and Museum ===
Charles Dickens visited the building in 1858 and signed the visitors book. His comment seems to suggest he found the habits of people staying in Harrogate to be quite odd and not to his tastes. He wrote "(Harrogate is) the queerest place, with the strangest people in it, leading the oddest lives of dancing, newspaper-reading and dining."

In 1911, Tsarina Alexandra of Russia who was the wife of Nicholas II of Russia visited the Pump Room.

On 2 December 1987, the Duke of Gloucester formally re-opened the Royal Pump Room Museum. A stone tablet recording this event is set in to one of the building's walls.

In 2013, Harrogate-born actor Jim Carter gave a talk at the museum in which he discussed his life and acting roles.

== See also ==
- Grade II* listed buildings in North Yorkshire (district)
- Listed buildings in Harrogate (Low Harrogate Ward)
