= Listed buildings in the United Kingdom =

Map of the United Kingdom

This is a list of listed buildings in the United Kingdom.

The organisation of the lists in this series is on the same basis as the statutory registers, which generally rely on counties. For England and Wales, the county names are broadly those of the ceremonial counties of England and Wales and do not always match the current administrative areas, whereas in most cases they parallel the current subdivisions of Scotland. In Northern Ireland the province's six traditional counties are used, and these are unchanged in modern times.

Different classifications of listed buildings are used in different parts of the United Kingdom:

- England and Wales: Grade I, Grade II* and Grade II;
- Scotland: Category A, Category B and Category C
- Northern Ireland: Grade A, Grade B+, Grade B1 and Grade B2

Number of sites
	England	Scotland	Wales	Northern Ireland	Total
Grade I	9,309	n/a	488	n/a	9,797
Grade II*	21,768	n/a	2,104	n/a	23,872
Grade II	343,004	n/a	27,333	n/a	370,337
Category A	n/a	3,707	n/a	n/a	3,707
Category B	n/a	23,839	n/a	n/a	23,839
Category C	n/a	20,103	n/a	n/a	20,103
Grade A	n/a	n/a	n/a	206	206
Grade B+	n/a	n/a	n/a	578	578
Grade B1	n/a	n/a	n/a		
Grade B2	n/a	n/a	n/a		
Total	374,081	47,649	29,925	~8,500	~460,000

== Listed buildings in the United Kingdom ==
The lists for the countries of the UK are at:

- Listed buildings in England
- Listed buildings in Scotland
- Listed buildings in Northern Ireland
- Listed buildings in Wales

== See also ==
- Scheduled monument
- Listed buildings in the Falkland Islands
