= Tourelle =

Tourelle may refer to:

- Tourelle (architecture), a type of turret
- Tourelle, Quebec, a former municipality that is now part of Sainte-Anne-des-Monts, Quebec
