= Listed buildings in Harrogate (Low Harrogate Ward) =

Low Harrogate is a ward in the town of Harrogate, North Yorkshire, England. It contains 56 listed buildings that are recorded in the National Heritage List for England. Of these, five are listed at Grade II*, the middle of the three grades, and the others are at Grade II, the lowest grade. The ward is in the centre of the town, and some of its listed buildings reflect its history as a spa town. Others are commercial buildings, public buildings, houses and associated structures, offices and shops, and the others include churches, a boundary marker, hotels and public houses, almshouses, memorials, a theatre and a concert hall, and lamp posts.

== Key ==
Grade	Criteria
II*	Particularly important buildings of more than special interest
II	Buildings of national importance and special interest

== Buildings ==
Name and location	Photograph	Date	Notes	Grade
35–39 Swan Road; 53.99400°N 1.54683°W	—	Late 18th century	The buildings are in gritstone with three storeys, and each has a round-headed doorway with pilasters, a radial fanlight and an entablature, and sash windows. Nos. 37 and 39 are earlier, with a stone slate roof, four bays and a modern shopfront. No. 35, to the left, dates from the early 19th century, and is taller with two bays.	II
Stone pillar 53.98784°N 1.53981°W		1788	The pillar was erected by the Turnpike trust to mark the boundary between the Leeds and Ripon turnpike roads. It is a roughly-hewn inscribed gritstone monolith.	II
12 Swan Road; 53.99582°N 1.54685°W	—	c. 1815	Originally a lodging house, the house is in stone on a plinth, with a floor band, bracketed overhanging eaves, and a hipped slate roof. There are three storeys, a square plan, three bays, and a two-storey rear wing. In the centre is a porch that has fluted columns with Egyptian-style capitals and a pediment, and a doorway with a fanlight. The windows are sashes, those in the ground floor with moulded surrounds.	II
2–9 Prospect Place; 53.99124°N 1.54098°W		c. 1820	A terrace of lodging houses, later a hotel and private houses, in gritstone with cornices, some bracketed, and slate roofs. There are three storeys and semi-basements, and each part has two or three bays. On the front are doorways and French windows approached by steps with wrought iron railings, with Doric or Ionic columns or pilasters, entablatures and fanlights. The windows are sashes, some with architraves, there are four two-storey splayed bay windows, and in the roof are gabled dormers.	II
The White Cottage; 53.99346°N 1.54501°W		c. 1822	Originally a ticket office, it is in gritstone on a plinth, with a Greek key frieze, a projecting cornice, and a pyramidal slate roof. There is a single storey and an octagonal plan, with a doorway on one side and sash windows on the other sides.	II
12 and 14 Cold Bath Road; 53.99130°N 1.54722°W	—	Early 19th century	A pair of houses in gritstone, with sill string courses, eaves with paired brackets, and a slate roof with coped gables. There are three storeys and a semi-basement, and each house has two bays. In the centre, steps flanked by cast iron railings lead up to paired round-headed doorways with pilasters, radial fanlights and keystones. In the outer bays are two-storey segmental bow windows with pilasters and a cornice, and the other windows are recessed sashes.	II
22 and 24 Cold Bath Road; 53.99081°N 1.54760°W	—	Early 19th century	A pair of houses in gritstone with paired eaves brackets and a slate roof. There are three storeys and a semi-basement, and each house has two bays. Steps flanked by cast iron railings lead up to doorways in the right bays, with attached quasi-Doric columns, a fanlight, and an entablature with triglyphs in the frieze. The windows are recessed sashes.	II
26 and 28 Cold Bath Road; 53.99065°N 1.54770°W		Early 19th century	A house and a shop in gritstone, with bracketed eaves, and a slate roof with coped gables. There are three storeys and a semi-basement, and four bays. The right two bays contain a projecting modern shopfront. In the second bay, steps flanked by cast iron railings lead up to a doorway with a fanlight and a hood on console brackets. The windows are sashes in eared architraves.	II
12–15 Prospect Place; 53.99193°N 1.54130°W		Early 19th century	A terrace of four houses in gritstone, with floor bands, bracketed gutters and a Welsh slate roof. There are three storeys and semi-basements, and each house has two bays. In the left bay of each house, steps flanked by wrought iron railings lead up to a round-arched doorway with a radial fanlight. Nos. 12 and 13 have cornices on consoles, and No. 12 also has a pediment. Nos. 14 and 15 have pilasters and an entablature with triglyphs. In the right bay of each house is a two-storey splayed bay window with a cornice, and the other windows are sashes, some with aprons.	II
1–4 West Park; 53.99007°N 1.54070°W		Early 19th century	A terrace of four houses in gritstone with cornices, blocking courses, and slate roofs. There are three storeys and semi-basements, Nos. 1 and 2 have three bays, and Nos. 3 and 4 have two bays each. Flanking the entrance bays are full-height segmental bow windows, and the windows are sashes. No. 1 has a Doric doorcase, and a round-arched doorway with a radial fanlight, No. 2 has a prostyle Ionic portico with a decorated frieze, and a doorway with an architrave and a fanlight. Nos. 3 and 4 each has an Ionic doorcase and a doorway with a patterned fanlight. The entrances are approached by steps with cast iron railings.	II*
6–12 York Place; 53.98795°N 1.53761°W	—	Early 19th century	A terrace of seven houses of different builds, in gritstone with sill bands, slate roofs and sash windows. The doorways have attached Tuscan columns, an entablature and a patterned fanlight. Each house has a full-height splayed or bowed bay window.	II
Hales Bars; 53.99391°N 1.54680°W		c. 1827	A public house on a corner site that was extended later in the 19th century, in gritstone with a slate roof. There are three storeys, two bays, one bay in the return, a bowed bay on the corner, and a three-bay gabled extension. In the original part is a public house front with pilasters and an entablature, and recessed sash windows. The extension has two storeys and an attic, and the entrance and windows have segmental heads and keystones.	II
1–7 Albert Terrace; 53.98972°N 1.53737°W		Early to mid 19th century	A terrace of seven houses in stone with bracketed gutters and a Welsh slate roof. There are two storeys, and each house has two bays. The doorways have panelled pilasters, a rectangular fanlight, an entablature and a pedimented blocking course. The windows are recessed sashes, and there are later dormers.	II
1–4 Montpellier Gardens; 53.99341°N 1.54451°W		Early to mid 19th century	A row of four shops with residential accommodation above, in gritstone, with a bracketed eaves cornice and a slate roof. There are three storeys and cellars, and each shop has two bays. In the ground floor are projecting shopfronts with pilasters and an entablature-fascia. The house doorways have pilasters and fanlights. In the middle floor are four splayed bay windows with pilasters, an entablature, a projecting cornice, and a decorative hood board. The other windows are recessed sashes.	II
Royal Pump Room; 53.99358°N 1.54679°W		1842	The Old Sulphur Well is incorporated in the basement of the building, which was extended in 1912–13, and since 1953 has been a museum. The original part is in gritstone and has an octagonal plan, and an ogee dome with copper tiles and a central lantern. Four side bays project and have Corinthian pilasters on quoins carrying an entablature and a blocking course. They contain sash windows with panelled surrounds, channelled aprons and pediments, and above is a cornice and a pediment. In the recessed bays are doorways with segmental pediments, over which is an inscribed panel. The extension is in iron and glass, and has a copper roof.	II*
St Julien; 53.99315°N 1.54602°W		1845	A shop, at one time a pharmacy, with offices above, which was refronted in 1913. It is in stone with a bracketed eaves cornice, a Welsh slate roof, and four storeys. In the ground floor is a shopfront with Corinthian pilasters, a curved window and a recessed doorway with a fanlight, and to the right is another doorway with a fanlight. In the first floor are mullioned windows, and the top two floors contain pilasters and sash windows.	II
White Hart Hotel; 53.99268°N 1.54596°W		1846	The hotel is in gritstone, with sill string courses, a cornice and a blocking course, and a hipped slate roof. There are three storeys and attics, and eleven bays. On the front is an Ionic doorcase with coupled columns, and above it is a sculpture of a hart. The doorway is round-arched, and has pilasters, a fanlight and an archivolt. The windows are sashes, those in the ground floor with round heads, archivolts and impost bands, and in the attics are dormers.	II*
Crown Hotel; 53.99357°N 1.54580°W		1847	The hotel, which was extended in 1870 with wings designed by J. I. Hirst, is in gritstone with hipped slate roofs. The original part has three storeys and attics, and five bays, the outer bays recessed. The three central bays have quoins, and above are pilasters with an entablature and a balustraded parapet. The windows are sashes in architraves, some with a pediment. In the centre is a Corinthian prostyle portico in antis. The flanking wings have three storeys and three bays each, and at the east end is a four-stage tower with a circular cupola. The ground floor is rusticated, and each bay contains a two-storey canted bay window with a blind balustraded balcony and cornices. Bow windows have been added at the sides and the rear.	II
Three lamp posts, Crown Place; 53.99364°N 1.54653°W		1848	The lamp posts are in cast iron. Each lamp post has a square base decorated with a Yorkshire rose and a palmette. Above is a tapering reeded column with a bell capital and a palmette, and a pair of small lion heads flanked by ornately shaped ladder rests. On the top is a modern reproduction of a Windsor-style lantern.	II
Six lamp posts, Montpellier Parade; 53.99260°N 1.54348°W		1848	The lamp posts are in cast iron. Each lamp post has a square base decorated with a Yorkshire rose and a palmette. Above is a tapering reeded column with a bell capital and a palmette, and a pair of small lion heads flanked by ornately shaped ladder rests. On the top is a modern reproduction of a Windsor-style lantern.	II
Two lamp posts, Swan Road; 53.99532°N 1.54689°W	—	1848	The lamp posts are in cast iron. Each lamp post has a square base decorated with a Yorkshire rose and a palmette. Above is a tapering reeded column with a bell capital and a palmette, and a pair of small lion heads flanked by ornately shaped ladder rests. The lamps have been lost,	II
27 and 29 Swan Road; 53.99513°N 1.54671°W		c. 1860	A pair of semi-detached houses in gritstone, with a sill band, a bracketed eaves cornice and a slate roof. There are two storeys, a semi-basement and attics, and each house has three bays. In the centre is a doorway with a bracketed cornice and a fanlight, the left fanlight rectangular, the right radial. The doorways are flanked by splayed bay windows with cornices. The upper floor contains sash windows, In the left house they have segmental heads; in the right house the middle window is round-headed with imposts and a keystone, and the outer bays contain two-light windows with segmental heads. In the attics are flat-headed dormers, each with twelve lights.	II
Belvedere House; 53.99027°N 1.54067°W		c. 1861	A large house later extended and used for other purposes, in gritstone with string courses, a cornice, a pierced parapet and a hipped slate roof with a central Dutch gable. The original block has three storeys, three bays and a recessed bay on the left. On the right corner is an embattled tourelle. Projecting from the front is a porte-cochère with four-centred arches and decorated spandrels. Above the entrance is a two-storey segmental bow window, flanked by single-storey bay windows with quatrefoil pierced parapets and aprons. To the left is a four-storey belvedere with a decorative blocking course and an ogee roof, and further to the left is a recessed bay with a Dutch gable.	II
Wall and gateway, Former Belvedere; 53.99037°N 1.54006°W	—	c. 1861	The wall is in gritstone, with ramped coping and quatrefoil panels. The gateway has a four-centred arch with a hood mould and embattled coping.	II
West Park United Reformed Church; 53.99074°N 1.54046°W		1861–62	The church, designed by Lockwood and Mawson, is in rusticated gritstone, and has a slate roof with coped gables. There are six gabled bays, between which are buttresses and pairs of gargoyles. The arched doorway has a trefoil head and a hood mould, the west window has five lights, and the nave windows have two lights. On the southwest corner is a steeple with an octagonal belfry and a spire.	II
Wesley Chapel; 53.99411°N 1.54159°W		1862	The chapel, designed by Lockwood and Mawson, is in gritstone on a plinth, the ground floor and end bays rusticated, and the roof is slated. There are two storeys and a semi-basement podium, five bays on the front and six on the sides. On the front are six Corinthian pilasters, with consoles, a bracketed entablature, and a pediment containing foliated carving, an inscription and the date in the tympanum. Steps lead up to three round-arched doorways with fanlights, imposts, archivolts and keystones, and the outer bays contain segmental-arched windows. In the upper floor are round-arched widows with imposts and archivolts, those in the outer bays with pediments on console brackets.	II
1–12 Cambridge Crescent; 53.99310°N 1.54159°W		1867–68	The crescent, designed by J. I. Hirst, is in gritstone with red brick dressings, a bracketed cornice, a parapet, and slate mansard roofs. There are three storeys, attics, dormers and cellars, arranged in three-bay units. The windows in the upper floors are arched sashes, most with wrought iron balconies, those in the middle floor with pilasters, imposts and keystones, and in the top floor they are paired with carvings between. In the ground floor are shops and banks, some with elaborate entrances and surrounds.	II
Rogers' Almshouses; 53.99013°N 1.53773°W		1868	The almshouses are in rusticated gritstone, with a string course, a bracketed eaves course, and slate roofs with coped gables. There are two storeys, and three ranges around a courtyard. In the centre of the main range is a four-storey clock tower, with a two-light window in the ground floor in an arched recess with a carved tympanum, and a hood mould with an inscription. Above is a bust of the founder, loop windows, gabled clock faces and a pyramidal roof. The windows are paired casements, those in the lower floor with splayed reveals, and in the upper floor with trefoil heads and gables. The doorways are recessed, with fanlights, and bracketed hoods.	II
St Peter's Church; 53.99331°N 1.54097°W		1870–76	The church was designed by J. I. Hirst, and the tower was completed in 1926. The church is built in rusticated gritstone with pedimented buttresses and parapets, and has a slate roof with coped gables. It consists of a nave with a clerestory, north and south aisles, a south porch, north and south transepts, a chancel, a sanctuary with an apse, and a southwest tower. The tower has three stages, two-light bell openings, and a pierced embattled parapet.	II
St Robert's Church, presbytery and repository 53.98937°N 1.53719°W		1872–73	The buildings are in red brick with stone dressings and Welsh slate roofs. The church consists of a nave and a chancel under one roof, with a clerestory, aisles, and a south tower to the northeast with a saddleback roof. The entrance front is gabled and has a gabled porch, and on the gable apex is a bellcote with a spire. To the right is an archway linking to the presbytery that has two storeys and an attic. On the front is a two-storey canted bay window, and to the right is a canted corner turret. The repository to the east has two storeys and three bays, sash windows and hipped dormers.	II
1–10 Prospect Crescent; 53.99285°N 1.54125°W		1873–80	The crescent, designed by J. I. Hirst, is in gritstone and has hipped slate roofs with ornamental iron cresting to the pavilions. There are three storeys, cellars and attics, and 27 bays. In the ground floor are modern shopfronts and entrances. Between the bays in the upper two floors are giant Corinthian pilasters carrying an entablature, and the windows are round-headed sashes with archivolts, impost bands and keystones, and at intervals are splayed bay windows. The attic windows are pedimented, between them are blind balustrades, and on the roof are urns.	II
Former Town Hall; 53.99427°N 1.54697°W		1874	Built as Assembly Rooms, at one time the Town Hall, and later an art gallery, the building is in gritstone, and has a balustraded parapet and a hipped slate roof. There is a single storey and five bays, the outer bays pavilions with Corinthian pilasters, entablatures, and steep roofs in French style with ornamental cast iron cresting. In the centre is a Corinthian portico in antis, with a pediment containing a coat of arms, and a round-arched doorway with a fanlight. The windows in the other bays are round-arched with carved imposts, archivolts and keystones. At the rear, the building incorporates an early 19th-century house.	II
14–24 Crescent Road; 53.99422°N 1.54560°W		1874–75	A range of shops, designed by J. I. Hirst, with a curvd corner, a cornice surmpunted by draped durns, and a slate roof. There are rthree storeys and nine bays. Between the bays in the lower two storeys are rusticated pilasters, and the window in the top floor form a recessed arcade. Beneath the windows in the upper floor are blind balustrades. The openings in the lower two floors have segmental arches with keystones, and in the top floor are casement windows with round arches and keystones.	II
24 and 26 James Street; 53.99254°N 1.53967°W	—	Late 19th century	A stuccoed shop with rusticated quoins and a slate mansard roof. There are two storeys and an attic, and in the ground floor is a modern shopfront. The upper floor contains three round-arched windows with keystones, and in the attic is a pedimented dormer. In front of the shop is a decorative cast iron arcade with fluted columns and a wrought iron pediment.	II
50 and 52 Parliament Street; 53.99462°N 1.54364°W	—	Late 19th century	A pair of shops in gritstone, with a cornice, a parapet with balustraded panels and ball finials, and a slate mansard roof. There are three storeys and attics, and four bays. In the ground floor are projecting shopfronts with pilasters and a fascia-entablature. The doorways are recessed and have fanlights. In the middle floor are two square bay windows, the top floor contains recessed sash windows, and in the attic are pedimented dormers.	II
54 and 56 Parliament Street; 53.99471°N 1.54374°W	—	Late 19th century	A pair of shops in gritstone with a cornice. There are three storeys and an attic, and three bays. In the ground floor are shopfronts with pilasters, and griffin caryatids carrying a fascia-entablature. The shop windows have columnette mullions, the doorways are recessed with fanlights, and there is a modern glazed canopy. In the middle floor is a ten-light bow window with a domed roof, and the top floor contains recessed sash windows.	II
58 Parliament Street and 2 and 4 King's Road; 53.99483°N 1.54376°W	—	Late 19th century	A row of shops on a corner site in gritstone with bracketed eaves cornice and a slate roof. There are three storeys, six bays on King's Road, three on Parliament Street and a curved bay on the corner. In the ground floor are wooden shopfronts with recessed entrances, and to the left in King's Road is an arched passageway with a doorway containing a fanlight . In the middle floor on King's Road are two splayed bay windows, and the other windows are recessed sashes.	II
63–81 Station Parade; 53.99150°N 1.53723°W		Late 19th century	A terrace of nine shops in rusticated stone, with sill bands, bracketed eaves, sill bands and slate roofs. There are three storeys and attics, and each shop has three or four bays. In the ground floor are shopfronts, and a cast iron arcade with reeded columns and decorative motifs, and glazed roofs. The middle floor contains splayed bay windows, and the other windows are round-headed with impost bands and keystones. The attics contain gabled dormers.	II
33 Swan Road; 53.99414°N 1.54694°W	—	Late 19th century	A shop with living accommodation, it is stuccoed, and has bracketed eaves and a slate roof with a gabled front. There are three storeys and two bays. In the ground floor is a shopfront with pilasters and a projecting cornice on modified consoles, and to the right is a doorway with a fanlight. The middle floor contains two splayed bay windows with pilasters and an entablature, and in the top floor are two-light segmental-arched sash windows with bracketed cornices.	II
3–25 Swan Road; 53.99556°N 1.54636°W		1881–86	A crescent of twelve houses in gritstone, with sill bands, bracketed eaves and a slate roof. There are three storeys and a semi-basement, and each house has two bays. In the ground floor is a doorway with a fanlight and a splayed bay window. The other windows are sashes, those in the middle floor with shaped lintels. Each pair of houses is linked by a slated tented canopy with a carved eaves band.	II
1–3 Crown Place; 53.99377°N 1.54648°W	—	1884	A terrace of three shops, designed by J. I. Hirst, in gritstone, with sill bands and string courses, bracketed eaves and a slate roof. There are three storeys, six bays on the front, one on the left return, and a splayed bay on the corner. The windows are sashes with plain surrounds. In the ground floor are rusticated pilasters, the shop windows are flanked by Corinthian columns, and two shops have moulded heads and keystones. The entrances are recessed with fanlights.	II
2–6 Crescent Road; 53.99392°N 1.54638°W	—	1884–86	Three shops, designed by J. I. Hirst, in gritstone with bracketed eaves and slate roofs. No. 2 has three storeys and two bays, sill bands and string courses, In the ground floor are rusticated pilasters, and shop windows with moulded heads and keystones, and above are sash windows with plain surrounds. Nos. 4 and 6 are later and lower, with two storeys and cellars, and four bays. In the ground floor are rusticated pilasters and an entablature, with modern doorways and windows. The middle floor contains splayed bay windows, and in the top floor are recessed sash windows.	II
Jubilee Memorial; 53.99234°N 1.53810°W		1887	The memorial commemorates the Golden Jubilee of Queen Victoria, it was designed by H. E. Bown, and the statue is by William Webber. The statue of Queen Victoria stands in a Gothic canopy with quatrefoil-arched openings, surmounted by a pinnacle. The canopy has a granite base with trefoil three-bay recesses on the sides, embattled coping, and lions rampant.	II
8–12 Crescent Road; 53.99403°N 1.54602°W	—	c. 1890	A row of shops in gritstone, with string courses, a cornice with urns, and a slate roof. There are three storeys, and five bays, each containing three windows. The ground floor has rusticated pilasters and an entablature, and a shopfront with recessed entrances. Between the upper floor bays are decorated pilasters, and the middle floor contains sash windows in architraves. In the top floor, the windows have round arches, balusters, impost bands and keystones.	II
Royal Baths; 53.99442°N 1.54451°W		1894–97	The baths, later used for other purposes, are in limestone with hipped slate roofs, and have a complicated plan. The front is symmetrical with a three-bays centre linked by three-bay extension to three-bay wings. In the centre of the building is a lead dome with a balustraded parapet and an octagonal Doric cupola, flanked by two bell towers with corner pinnacles. The centre block has a carved parapet with an obelisk and a coat of arms. On the front is a prostyle Doric portico in antis, and the forecourt wings have a balustraded parapet.	II
Refreshment kiosk 53.99132°N 1.55015°W		1895	The refreshment kiosk in Valley Gardens originated as the Magnesia Well Pump Room. It has an iron frame with an octagonal plan, and has a bronze dome surmounted by an octagonal flèche. The roof is carried on fluted Corinthian columns with glazed screens. The kiosk is surrounded by a cast iron arcade with barley-sugar columns and a glazed roof.	II
32 Parliament Street; 53.99417°N 1.54318°W		c. 1898	The entrance to a shopping arcade in gritstone, that has an embattled parapet with machicolations, and slate roofs with ornamental lead dressings. There are three storeys and gabled dormers, and three bays. The middle bay is carried up as a tower, with a spire in the form of a wooden belfry, and corner tourelles with gargoyle brackets. The windows are casements, with pointed heads, mullions and transoms, and hood moulds. The first floor has a bay window, with a parapet containing a dated plaque. In the ground floor are granite Corinthian columns and pilasters, with arched openings, and the shop windows have arcaded top lights.	II
Harrogate Theatre; 53.99438°N 1.53997°W		1898–1900	Originally the Grand Opera House, it was designed by Frank A. Tugwell, and restored and altered in 1972 by Roderick Ham. It is on an irregular corner site with a triangular plan, it is in red brick with stone dressings, and has a slate roof with parapets and coped gables. There are three storeys and attics, an entrance front of eight bays, and on the right corner is an octagonal tower with a cupola. At the entrance to the theatre are arches, and the entrance is flanked by shopfronts. Above, most of the windows are sashes in architraves, some with cornices and pediments. The interior is in Edwardian style.	II
Three lamp posts, Crown Roundabout; 53.99320°N 1.54581°W		1899	The lamp posts are in cast iron, with a cylindrical base containing a door with a coat of arms. Above this is a series of bands and a circular column carrying a square block with ball-ended ladder supports. At the top is modern lantern.	II
Lamp post, Station Parade; 53.99018°N 1.53692°W		1899 (or later)	The lamp post is in cast iron, with a cylindrical base containing a door with a coat of arms. Above this is a series of bands and a circular column carrying a square block with ball-ended ladder supports. At the top are scrolled lamp supports.	II
1–5 Parliament Street; 53.99289°N 1.54265°W		c. 1900	A café with living accommodation on a corner site, in gritstone with a slate roof, and in Scottish baronial style. There are four storeys and dormers, four bays on the front and two on the left return. The left return is gabled, and on the front are stepped gables. The ground floor contains modern shopfronts, entrances and a canopy with a glazed roof. In the upper floors are splayed two-storey bay windows with mullioned and transomed windows and balustraded parapets. The third bay on the front has a domed oriel window, above which is a dated and initialled plaque. On the corner is a tourelle with a clock.	II
9 Springfield Avenue and 2 Spring Grove; 53.99777°N 1.54304°W	—	1903	A pair of semi-detached houses in red brick and stucco with stone dressings and tile roofs. There are two storeys, attics and a basement. Each house has three bays, with a gable over the inner two bays. In the centre bay of each house is a two-storey canted bay window with quoins and a stone coped parapet with ball finials. It contains a segmental headed doorway with a fanlight and a segmental dentilled hood on brackets. The outer bays contain a five-light window with mullions, and elsewhere are casement windows. The inner bay contains French windows and has a tiled verandah with square chamfered pillars.	II
Royal Hall; 53.99541°N 1.54418°W		1903	A concert hall designed by Frank Matcham and Robert Beale, it is in limestone with slate roofs. It has a symmetrical front, the central part with two storeys and seven bays, containing three entrances and a portico in cast iron and glass. This is flanked by projecting three-bay pavilions, and on the right side is a lower projecting extension. Above is an elaborate Dutch gable containing a lunette, a coat of arms and an inscribed cartouche. On each pavilion is a domed lantern, and further back are hipped roofs over the stage areas, a large central copper dome, and smaller domed turrets on the corners.	II*
Public Library; 53.99108°N 1.53862°W		1904–06	The library, designed by H. T. Hare, is in rusticated sandstone. There are two storeys and a semi-basement, and two bays. The left bay has giant attached Ionic columns, and an entablature with a blocking course. It contains a window in an arched recess with a coved surround, above which is a shell containing a coat of arms, and a keystone with a head and flanking swags. At the top is a lettered frieze. The smaller right bay contains a doorway with an architrave, a cornice and a keystone, above which is a lunette flanked by female figures.	II
Pavilion, Crescent Gardens; 53.99425°N 1.54637°W		1910–11	The pavilion has cast iron columns carrying decorative arched girders, and there are three bays. The walls have glazed panels, and the roof is hipped and glazed, with ornamental cast iron cresting, and a carved wooden eaves board.	II
Harrogate War Memorial; 53.99272°N 1.54187°W		1923	The war memorial was designed by Ernest Prestwich, with sculpture by Gilbert Ledward, and consists of an obelisk in Portland stone 20 metres (66 ft) tall. The obelisk stands on a square plinth on a shallow platform. On each face is a carved laurel wreath, on two faces are coats of arms, and on the other faces are a longsword. On the plinth are bronze plaques, some with depicted figures, and others with the names of those lost in the two World Wars and subsequent conflicts, and the holders of the Victoria cross. The memorial is surrounded by ten bollards linked by lengths of chain.	II*
