= Crown Hotel, Harrogate =

Hotel in Harrogate, North Yorkshire, England

Coordinates: 53.9936°N 1.5458°W

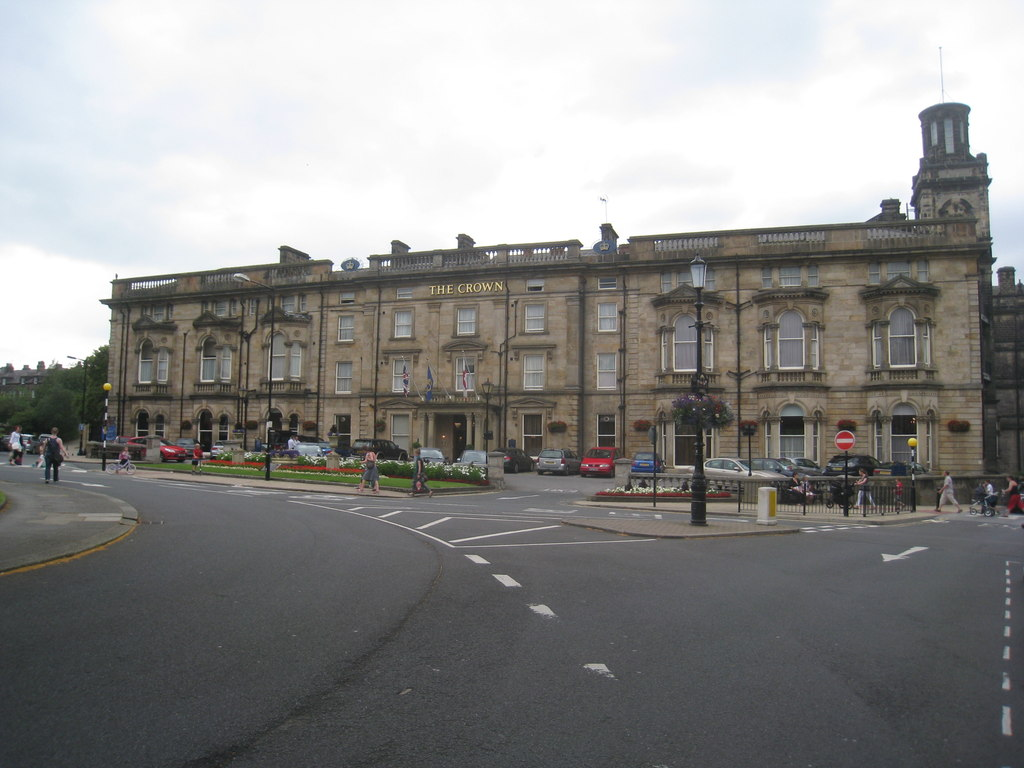
The hotel, in 2012

The Crown Hotel is a historic building in Harrogate, a town in North Yorkshire, in England.

The hotel was originally opened in 1740 by Joseph Thackwray, and expanded to encompass a terrace of small houses. In 1806, Byron composed "Ode to a Beautiful Quaker", one of his first poems, while staying at the hotel. In 1822, Thackwray's great-nephew, also Joseph Thackwray, found several wells, which he directed to supply the hotel. In addition to hot and cold baths, he installed shower, vapour, medicated and fumigating baths. It was rebuilt in 1847, probably to the design of Isaac Thomas Shutt. In 1870 its single-bay wings were replaced by three-bay Italianate wings, designed by John Henry Hirst. In 1899, the east front was redesigned by William James Morley, who added a tower. The hotel was requisitioned by the government in 1939, and used by the Air Ministry until 1959, when it returned to use as a hotel. The building was grade II listed in 1975.

The hotel is built of gritstone with hipped slate roofs. The original part has three storeys and attics, and five bays, the outer bays recessed. The three central bays have quoins, and above are pilasters with an entablature and a balustraded parapet. The windows are sashes in architraves, some with a pediment. In the centre is a Corinthian prostyle portico in antis. The flanking wings have three storeys and three bays each, and at the east end is a four-stage tower with a circular cupola. The ground floor is rusticated, and each bay contains a two-storey canted bay window with a blind balustraded balcony and cornices. Bow windows have been added at the sides and the rear. Inside, there is an Italianate entrance hall and dining room, and an open well staircase with an iron balustrade.

== See also ==
- Listed buildings in Harrogate (Low Harrogate Ward)
