= George Dawson (builder) =

English property developer (1821–1889)

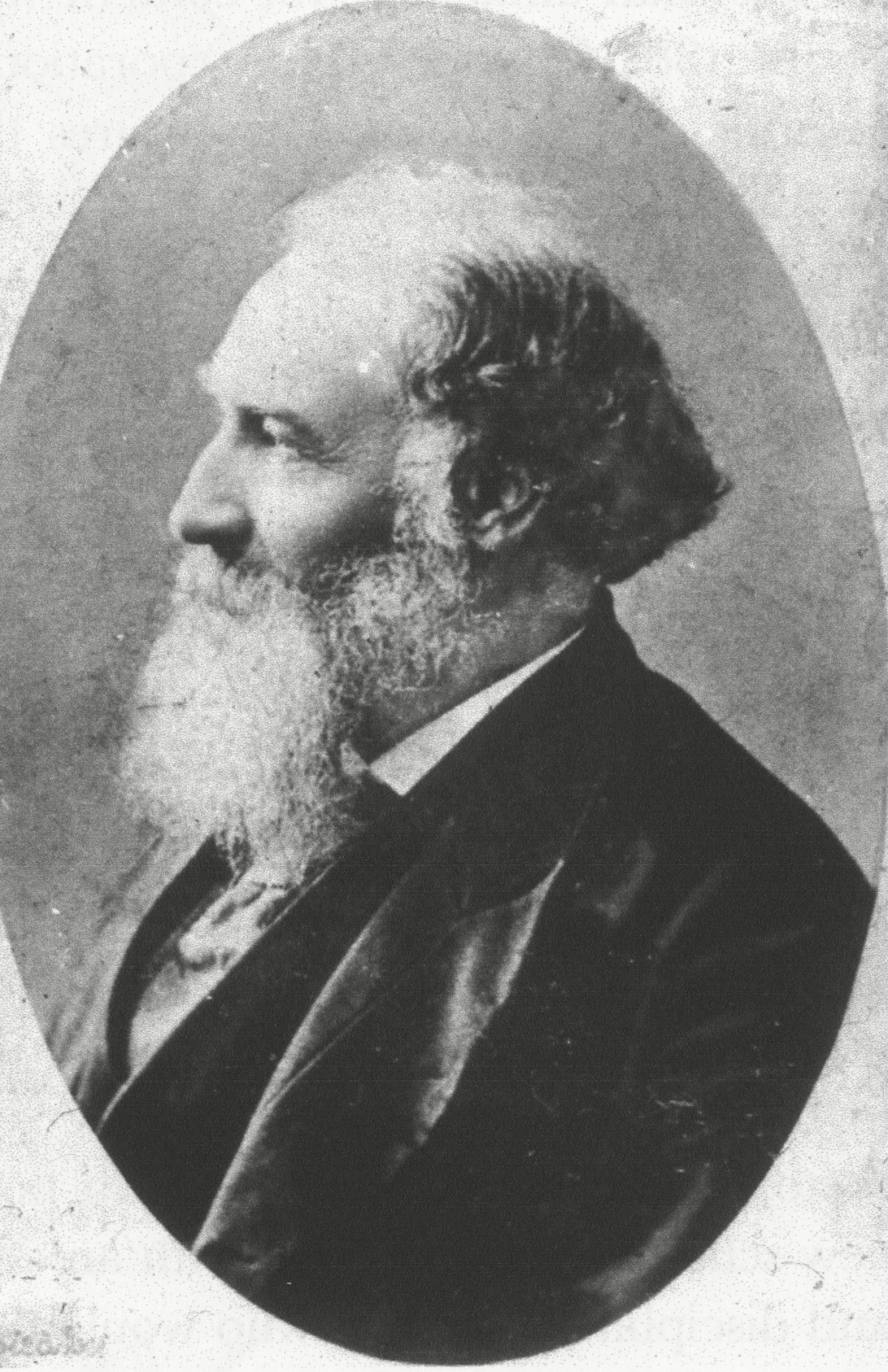
- Born: 12 June 1821; Skelton-on-Ure, North Riding of Yorkshire, England
- Died: 22 February 1889 (aged 67); Harrogate, England
- Burial place: Grove Road Cemetery, Harrogate
- Monuments: Large gravestone sculpture by Thomas Potts
- Occupations: Builder and developer; alderman
- Years active: 1855–1888
- Known for: Property development in Harrogate
- Notable work: Prospect Crescent; Cambridge Crescent; Vanderbilt Court; development of the Montpellier Quarter

George Dawson (12 June 1821 – 22 February 1889) was an English builder, property developer and alderman. The son of a village labourer, he was a self-made man who started as a cooper, became a rich entrepreneur and built himself a mansion.

However, Dawson achieved his success by hard work, and the mansion only appeared towards the end of his life. Between the coopering and the mansion-building, and in a working partnership with architect John Henry Hirst of Bristol, he built or expanded many large buildings in Harrogate. This included Prospect Crescent, Cambridge Crescent, the wings of the Crown hotel, and many blocks and large villas in the town. Alongside fellow developer Richard Ellis, he helped to develop Harrogate into a town with impressive buildings.

Dawson married twice and had eight children. After he died his second wife erected over his grave a large sculpture by Thomas Potts of Harrogate.

== Background ==
Dawson was a self-made man, with modest origins. The Census describes the arc of his career with much reservation. His father was Charles Dawson, a labourer, and his mother was Rebeccah Dawson. He was born on 12 June 1821, in the village of Skelton-on-Ure, North Riding of Yorkshire. (Note: Dawson's dates are on his gravestone)

Dawson married twice. His first wife, whom he married in Ripon in 1848, (Note: GRO index: Marriages Sep 1848 Bonwell Isabella, and Dawson George Ripon XXIII 437) was Isabella Bonwell (c. 1826 – 5 March 1857) from Kirkby Malzeard. (Note: GRO index: Deaths Mar 1857 Dawson Isabella Knaresbro' 9a 84) The 1851 Census finds him describing himself as a cooper and grocer, living with Isabella and their one-year-old daughter Ann Eliza (born c.1850) at 64 Towns Street, Kirkby Malzeard. They moved to Leeds where they had two more daughters, Emma Jane (born 1853), (Note: GRO index: Births Sep 1853 Dawson Emma Jane Leeds 9b 393) and Catherine Isabel (born 1857), then moved to Harrogate.

Dawson's second wife, whom he married in Portland Methodist Chapel, Clifton, Bristol on 28 April 1860, (Note: GRO index: Marriages Jun 1860 Oram Martha, and Dawson George Clifton 6a 285) was Martha Oram (20 May 1837 – 22 May 1913) from Castle Cary. (Note: GRO index: Deaths Jun 1913 Dawson Martha 76 St.Geo.H.Sq 1a 487. Martha Dawson's dates are also on her and her husband's gravestone) Dawson had three more daughters and two sons with Martha, so that he had eight children altogether. By 1861, Dawson was still describing himself as a cooper, and he and his family were living at 1 James Street, Bilton, Harrogate. It was not until the 1871 Census that Dawson described himself as a builder. That year shows him and his family as lodgers in James Street, Bilton, having added two more children to the family: George Edward. (born 1862), (Note: GRO index: Births Sep 1862 Dawson George Edward Bedminster 5c 724) and Mary Eva (born 1864). (Note: GRO index: Births Dec 1864 Dawson Mary Eva Knaresbro 9a 101) The 1881 Census finds Dawson and his wife lodging at Crown Wells House in Bilton, and Dawson is describing himself as a builder. By 1891 Martha Dawson is widowed, and is living with her daughter Mary Eva and her son in law in West Ham.

Historian Malcolm Neesam said of Dawson, "His brilliant business instinct made him a very rich man and it was with a nice sense of humour that he named his Victoria Avenue mansion Vanderbilt Court, after the famous American financier".

== Career ==
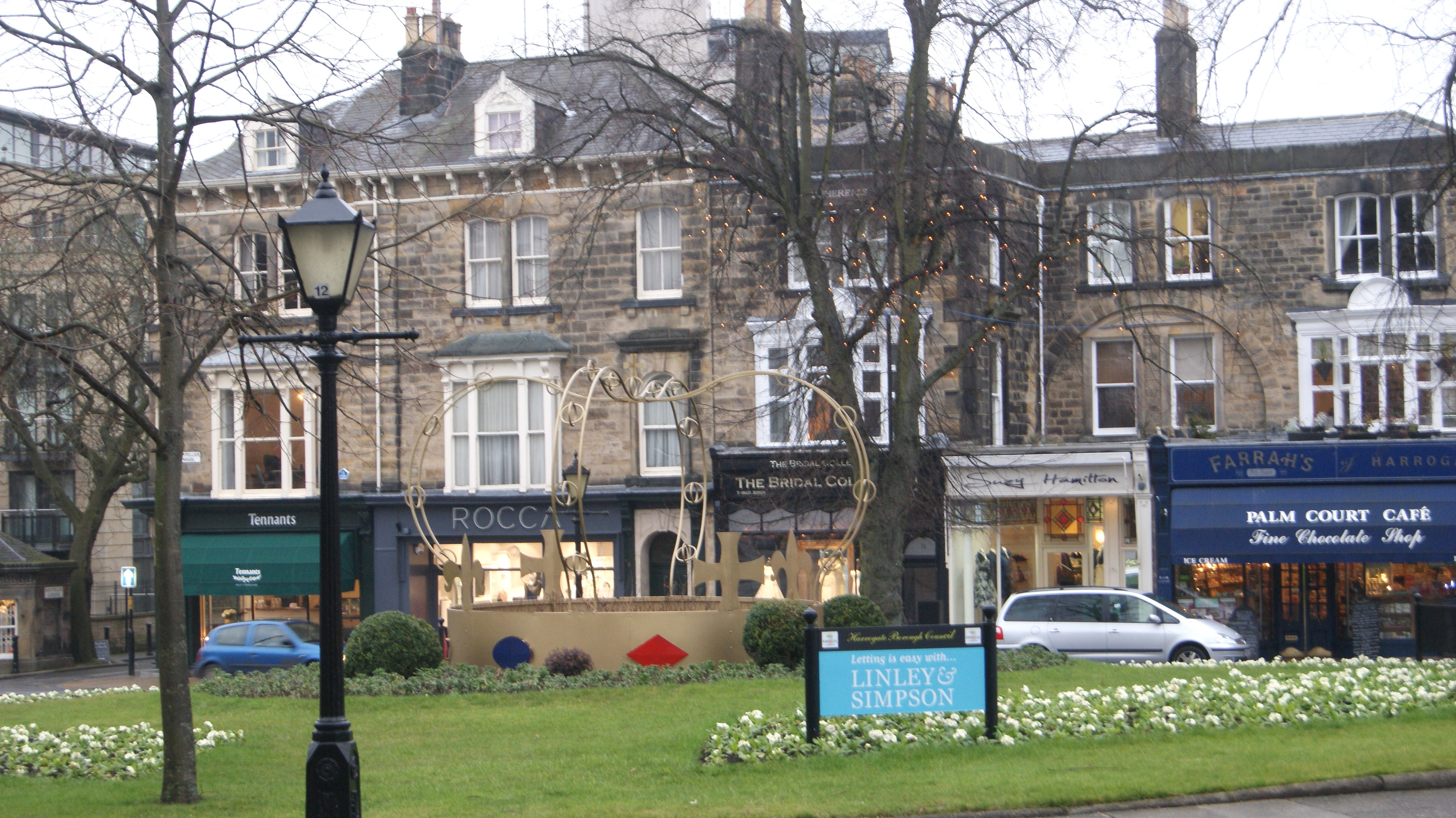
Ashfield house, far right, above Farrah's

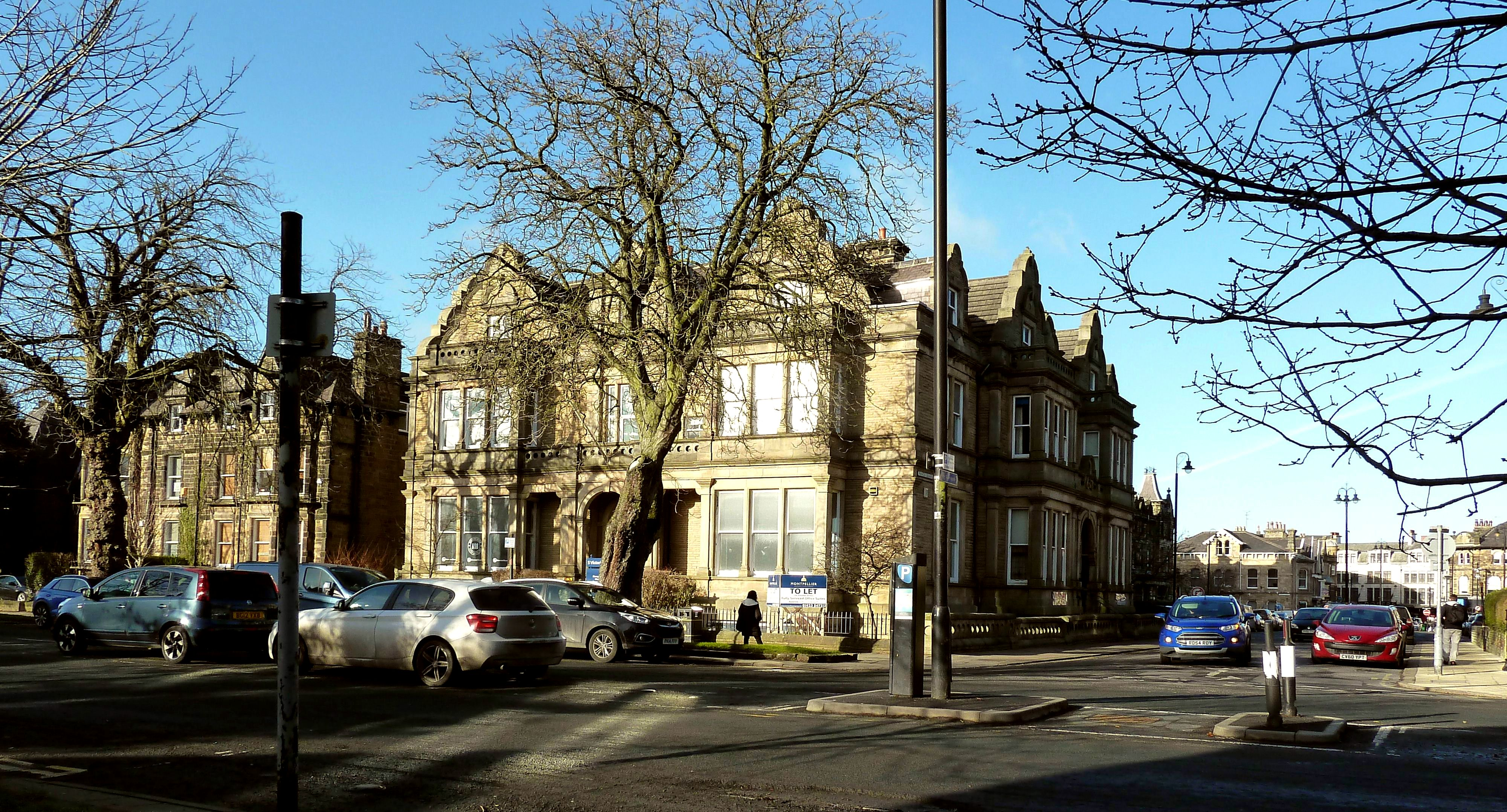
Vanderbilt Court, Dawson's residence

Dawson's most important works of property development were completed between 1867 and 1889, aided by his working partnership with architect John Henry Hirst (1826–1882) of Bristol. (Note: GRO index: Deaths Sep 1882 Hirst John Henry 56 Barton Regis 6a 82a)

Around 1855, Dawson arrived in Harrogate. He started out in the town as a cooper, running a store in Low Harrogate, and "through a mixture of hard work and obstinacy, he eventually earned enough to speculate as a builder". At some point between 1862 and 1865, he acquired the Ashfield House estate, which gave him opportunity to work on Lower Montpellier Parade, so his first business as an "enterprising" builder was the erection of Montpellier Parade, a terrace between Leicester House and Ashfield House. (Ashfield House is now occupied by Farrah's sweet shop). Around 1869, Dawson built a new pump room designed by J.H. Hirst, near the Montpellier Quarter, but it was demolished in 1954.

In the course of his career Dawson "erected several handsome blocks of buildings", which included the Britannia Buildings adjoining the Crown Estate, Prospect Crescent in James Street, Cambridge Crescent in Parliament Street, and "numerous others". Some of those others are buildings in Parliament Street including Fattorini the Jeweller (1866–1868), numbers 3–29 Swan Road (1881–1886), and James Street including Ogden's jewellers, his residence Vanderbilt Court at 5 Victoria Avenue, 2–24 Crescent Road (Grosvenor Buildings), the wings of the Crown Hotel, the block facing Victoria Park and Princes Square, and the block next to the Sulphur Well. He also built several villas in West End Park. Some of these are now listed buildings, for example, 1–10 Prospect Crescent, and 2–6 Crescent Road.

The whole of Mr Dawson's buildings have been erected with a view to their durability; and for solidity and the imposing character of their frontage they have few compeers. Harrogate Advertiser, 1889.

Regarding Prospect Crescent, Malcolm Neesam says this:

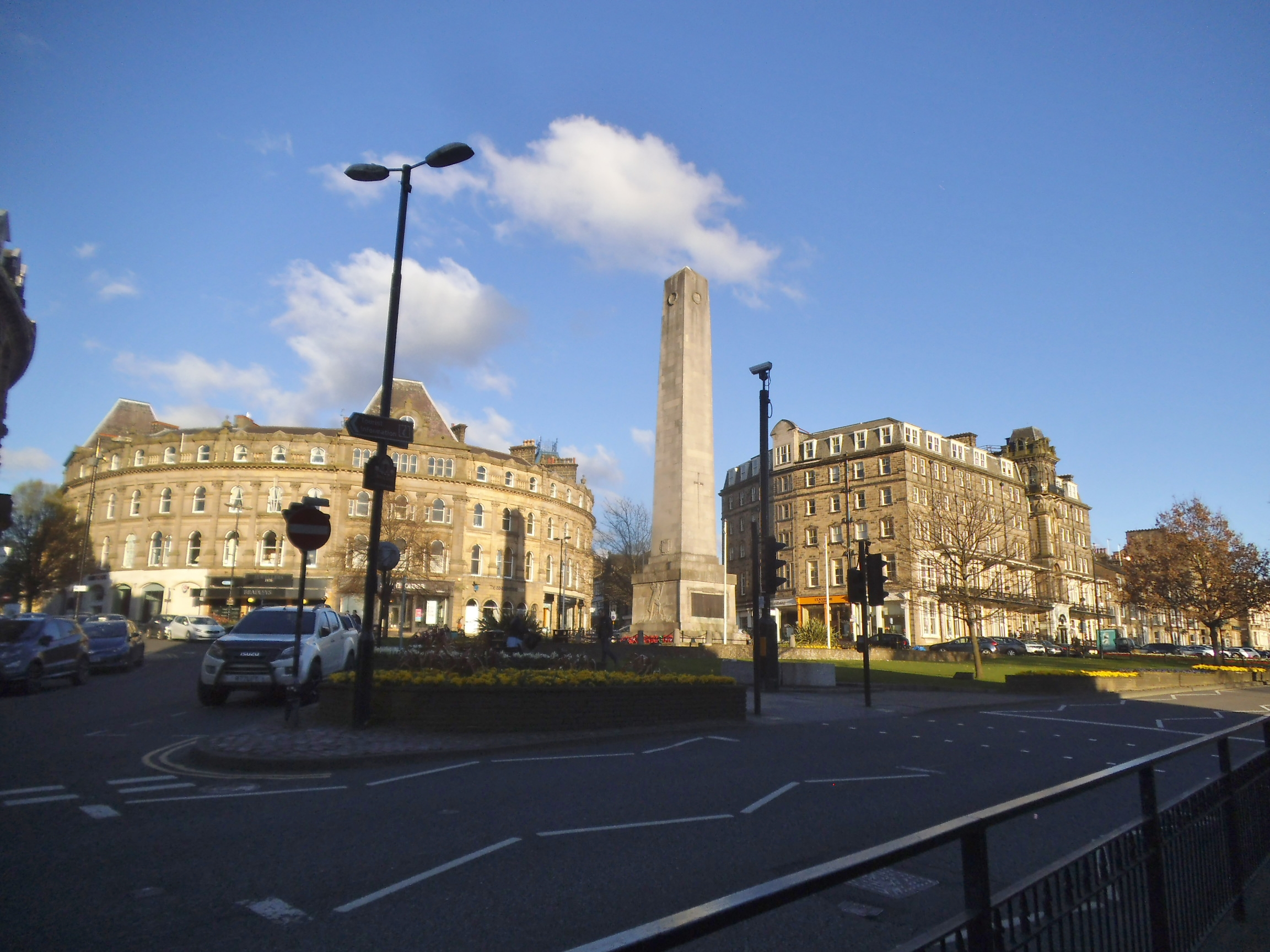
Prospect Crescent (left)

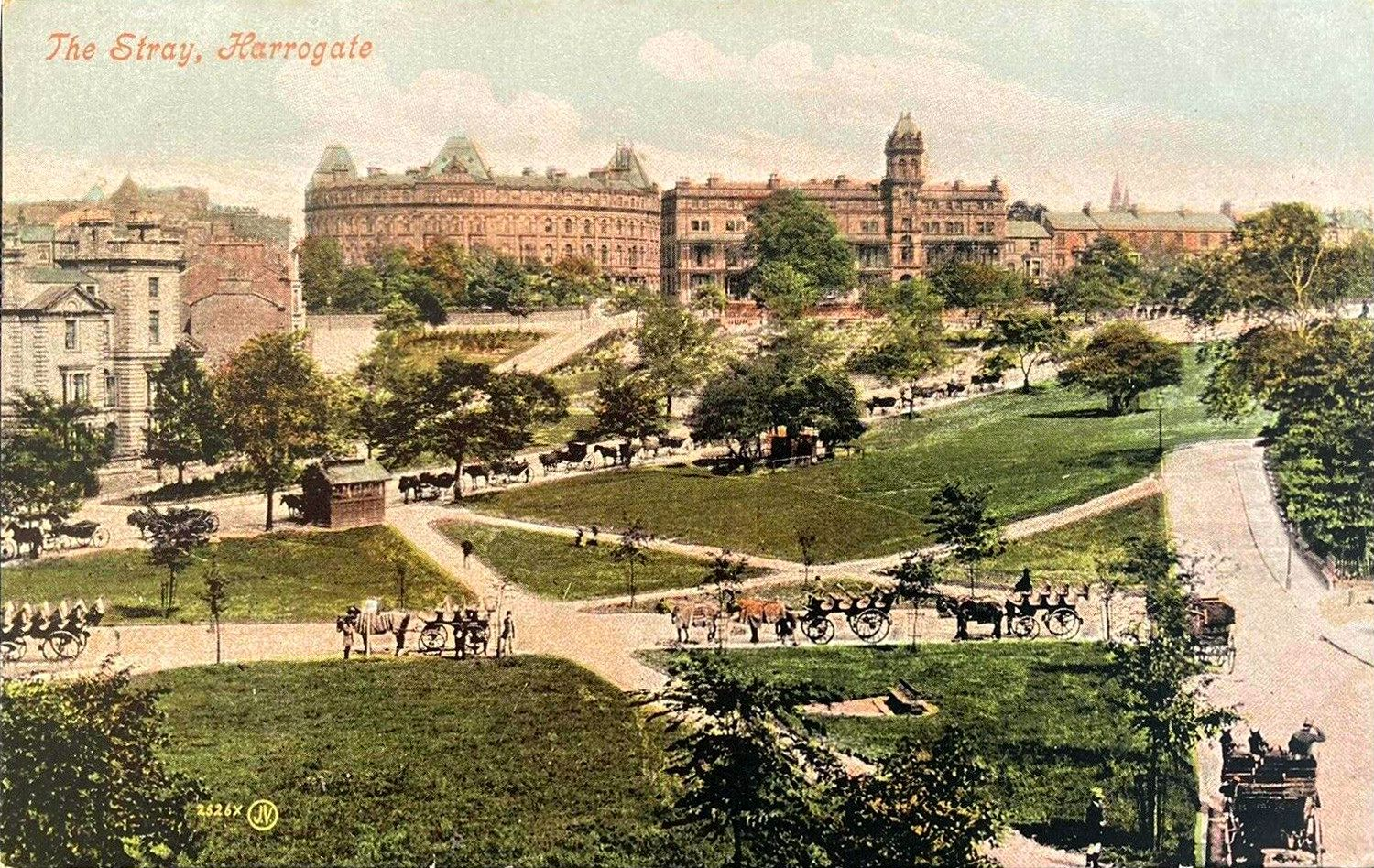
Prospect Crescent in its intended context, before 1914

Prospect Crescent, which overlooks the Low Harrogate Valley so impressively, is a massive pile of masonry with giant Corinthian pilasters running up the first and second storeys and several canted bays, also in solid stone. Each extremity of the crescent is crowned with a tall roof pavilion, similar to several others placed on local buildings of that time. When seen in late afternoon or early evening, with light from the setting sun illuminating its handsome frontage, Prospect Crescent takes on the appearance of a mini Colosseum. It is, however, a thousand pities that after the First World War, a series of alterations to the ground-floor commercial premises destroyed all save one of the magnificently florid façades created by builder George Dawson and architect J.H. Hirst.

In spite of his success as a developer, Dawson remained in hands-on control of his building business, including the careers of his apprentices. In 1882, apprentice Thomas Pearson pretended that he was already "of age", i.e. 21 years old, so that his contract was legally at an end. However Dawson checked his birth certificate and found that the lad was in fact 20 years old, and had another year to work his contract. Dawson applied for a court order, to get the lad back to work, and succeeded.

=== Crown Hotel and Montpellier Estate ===
In 1868 the Improvement Commissioners tried to purchase Harrogate's Crown Hotel and the attached Montpellier Estate from Thomas Collins, but failed, and Dawson purchased both. The Pateley Bridge and Nidderdale Herald tells the story:

The Crown Hotel at that time was but a small building, and nowhere had Mr Dawson's enterprise more demonstration than in the development and improvement of the building, which is one of the most palatial in the town. In connection with the Montpellier Estate [Dawson] built the Montpellier Room and otherwise improved the estate. (Note: The Montpellier Room is inside the Crown Hotel, and forms part of Dawson's c.1869 expansion of the building.)

Historian Malcolm Neesam comments that, "[Under Dawson's development plan], the Crown's Georgian wings were removed and replaced by Hirst with a powerful pair of Italian Renaissance replacements that gave the building great character and nobility".

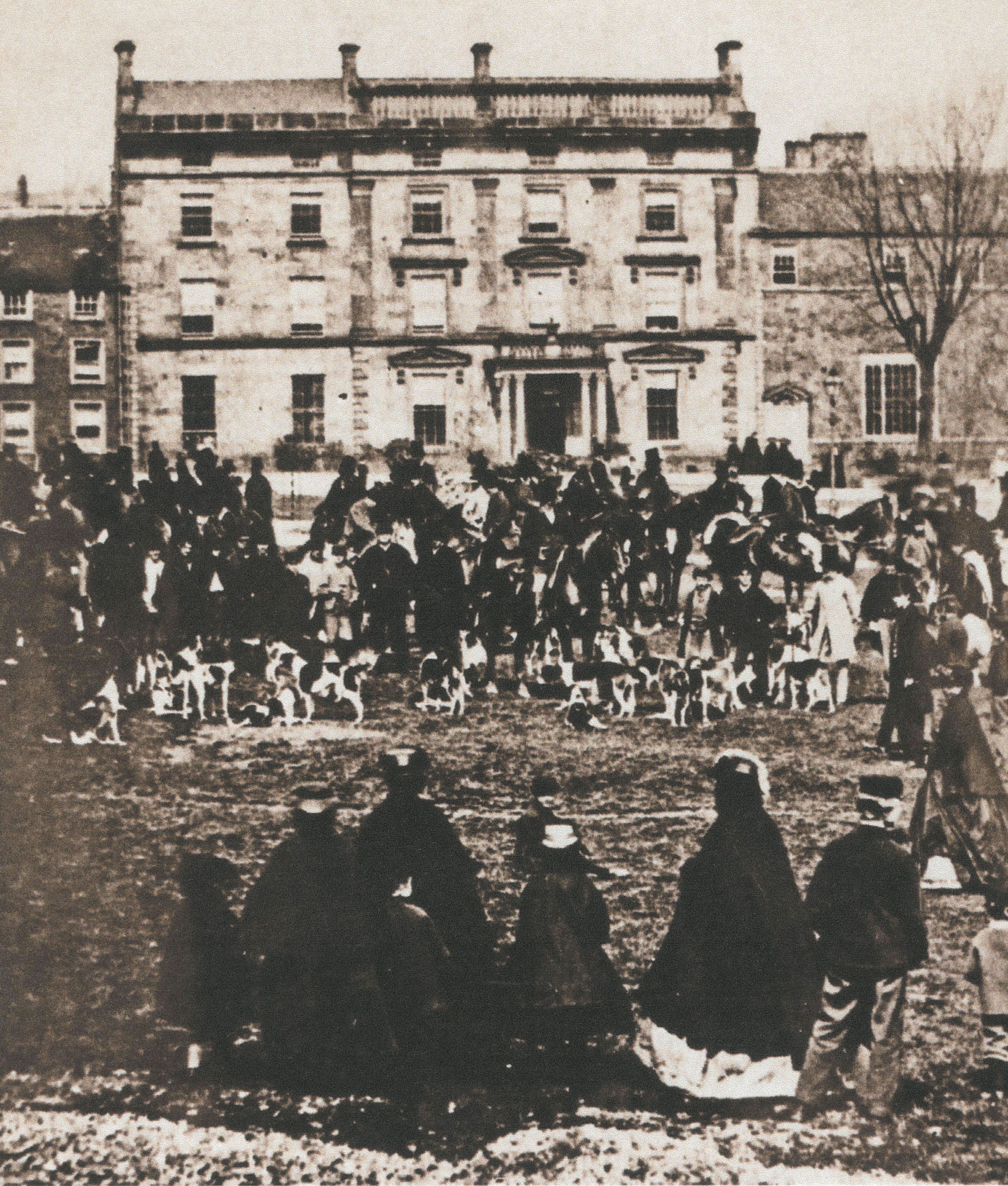
The Crown Hotel following I.T. Shutt's 1847 remodelling

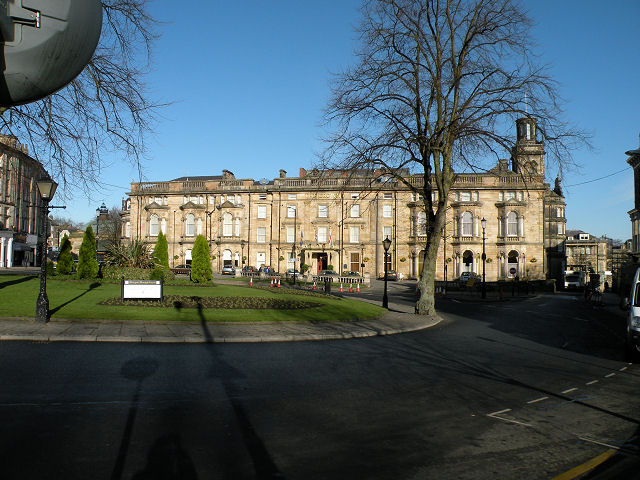
The Crown Hotel following Dawson's and Hirst's 1870 extensions

Dawson "improved the estate by altering the existing baths and almost entirely re-laying out the grounds". He sold the Montpellier Estate, and bought it back again in 1884, built Victorian Turkish baths there, and made improvement to the gardens. He then sold it to Harrogate Corporation, which came into possession of it on 7 January 1889. Thus Dawson's improvements of part of the Montpellier district of Harrogate became civic property. In response to a roller skating craze and some pressure from his second wife, Dawson built a circular roller-skating rink called the Montpellier Skating Rink at Montpellier Grounds, which was opened on 5 June 1876 by Dr Andrew Scott Myrtle. (Note: Dr Andrew Scott Myrtle (c.1825–1907) was a surgeon who helped popularise the Harrogate spa waters. See Knaresborough Post, 5 February 1887, "Death and funeral of Dr A. Myrtle", p.4 col.3) In 1877, though, he had difficulties with Frederick Issit, a prospective rink manager who had issues with alcohol. Dawson hired a different manager and sold the rink, but was taken to court and had to pay damages.

== Public life ==
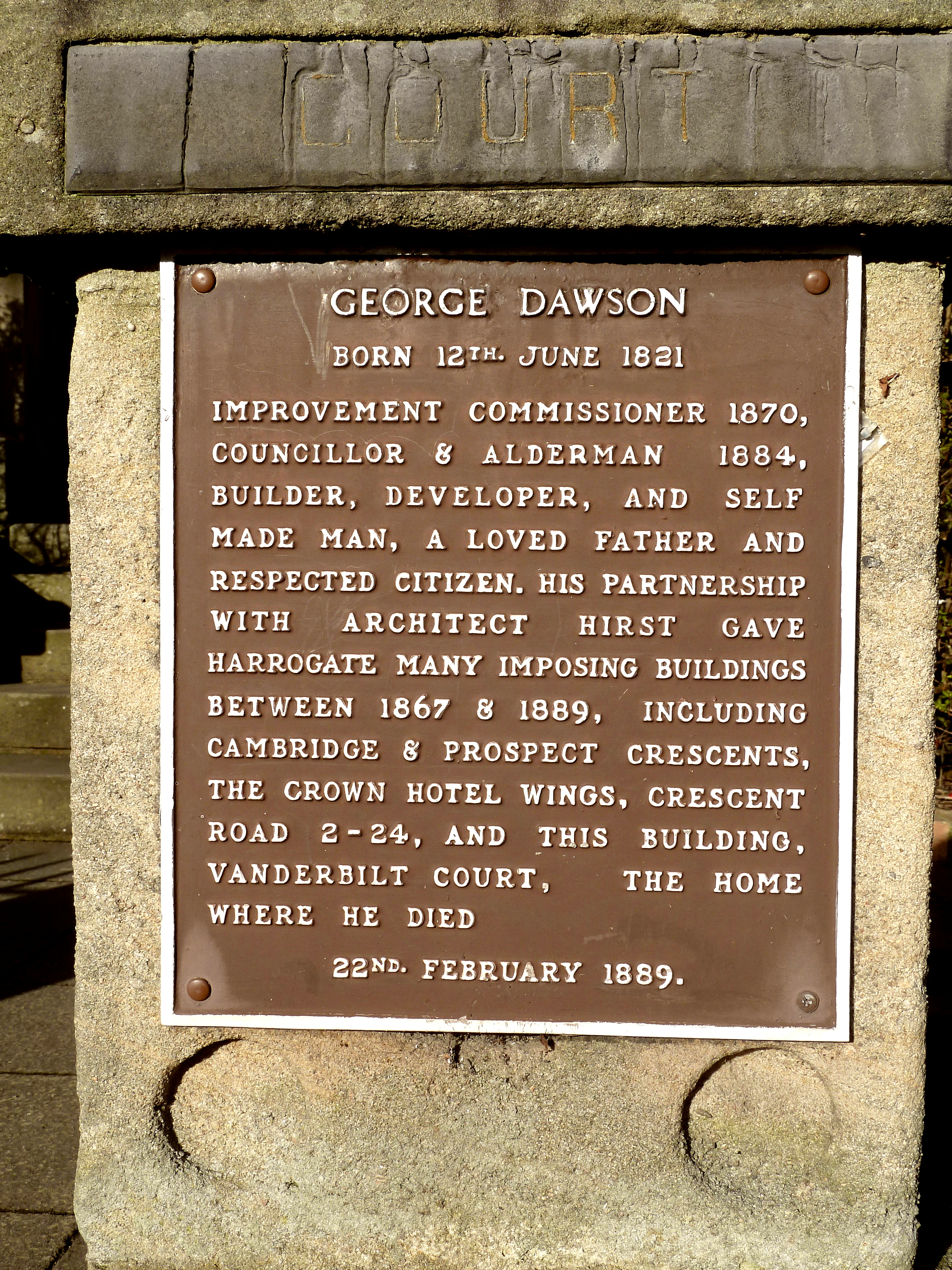
Dawson's brown plaque

Together with Robert Ackrill, Dawson was a "strong supporter" of local government. In April 1884, soon after the Charter of Incorporation was received, Dawson was elected as an alderman, being one of Harrogate Council's first members. He remained an active alderman of the council until his last illness. He was chairman of the Highways Committee, and "other important committees". He was councillor for the West Ward of the town at the end of his life, his death leaving a vacancy. Not long before he died, the other town councillors were considering making him mayor, "and probably only the state of his health prevented him being elected to that office".

Dawson was elected a member of the Northallerton Local board of health in 1870, when Robert Ackrill was chairman, and Dawson himself became chairman between 1887 and 1888. He was "one of the most active members of the Board, and had the chairmanship of most if not all of the committees". In the same year, he was elected to the Board of Improvement Commissioners for Harrogate.

Dawson was a director of the Steam Laundry Company, and of the Knaresborough, Harrogate and Claro Building Society.

=== Lay preacher ===
Dawson was a "staunch" and "powerful" local lay Wesleyan preacher for forty years. "He was once credited with manhandling a drunken member of his audience out of the hall". However he possibly mellowed in later years:

In Ripon circuit [which included Harrogate], he was well known as an earnest and practical preacher, his discourses ever being full of homely, gospel truth, and experience ... Though of late years he did not take upon himself the active labour which characterised his earlier life, he was nevertheless ever welcome in the pulpit as in the class. During his lifetime he held at various periods all the offices which it was the power of the Connexion to confer.

== Death ==
Dawson was an active employer and alderman until the end of 1888. He was ill and unable to leave his bedroom for more than four months, and died on the morning of 22 February 1889 at his home, Vanderbilt Court, 5 Victoria Avenue. (Note: GRO index: Deaths Mar 1889 Dawson George 67 Knaresbro' 9a 83. See also Dawson's death date on his gravestone) When Dawson died, the flag was lowered to half-mast, on the Council offices.

=== Funeral ===
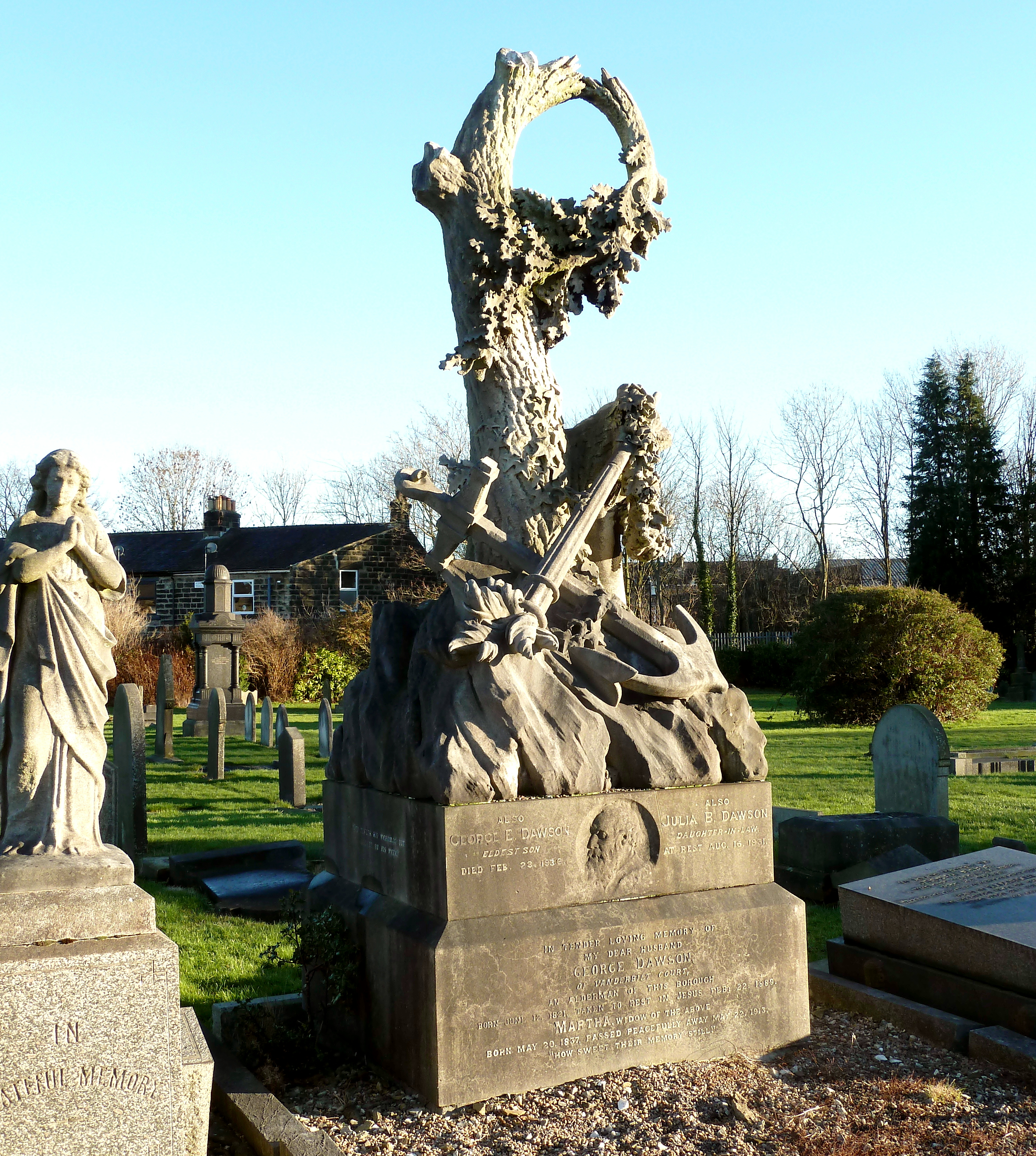
Dawson's grave monument by Thomas Potts

Dawson's funeral took place on Thursday, 28 February, and a "very large concourse of spectators" followed the hearse and the mourners. At midday, Dawson's tenants, and the tradespeople and robed Corporation of the town, met at the Crown Hotel in Low Harrogate and walked uphill together to Vanderbilt Court in High Harrogate, where the coffin awaited. The cortège processed from the house in Victoria Avenue to the Welseyan Chapel in Oxford Street, where there were sittings enough for the large congregation. A "special service" was conducted by two ministers "during a violent thunderstorm".

The cortège then processed across High Harrogate from the chapel to Grove Road Cemetery with Dawson's wife, children, brother, nephews, and nieces as chief mourners, and the townspeople walking behind. As was usual at that time, private houses along the route had their blinds drawn "in token of respect to the deceased". The last part of the funeral service was performed by a minister at the graveside, near to Richard Ellis' family plot, at the southern end of the graveyard. The coffin "was of polished oak with brass mountings ... covered with choice wreaths &c., and was carried by workmen in the employ of the deceased".

== Obituaries and other observations ==
As a property developer of large, expensive houses, Dawson created employment and attracted the rich to the town. Thus, the Pateley Bridge and Nidderdale Herald said this: "To Alderman Dawson, Harrogate owes much of the prestige it has gained for the character of the noble blocks of buildings which he has been instrumental in erecting". Hotels attracted rich visitors too, and the Harrogate Advertiser acknowledged that: "Perhaps nowhere in the town was Mr Dawson's indomitable enterprise more displayed than in the alteration of [the Crown Hotel]; it has not only been made an ornament to the town, but an honour to the name of its energetic proprietor".

It was architect John Henry Hirst who designed Dawson's buildings, but, Hirst being dead, Dawson received the credit from the Yorkshire Post and Leeds Intelligencer: "To [Dawson's] enterprise in that business [of building] is largely due the present architectural beauty of Low Harrogate". Between the lines of Richardson's (1892) summary of Dawson's character, is a hint of the tough business attitude of Dawson the working-class self-made man: "In a town noted for its building, no other individual had the courage to develop on the scale he set, to approach the high standards of architectural design and building construction he demanded, or the obstinacy to go against authority and popularity to pursue the course he knew was right". Dawson was a hands-on manager of his building works, and many who attended his funeral had been his employees. The minister at his funeral recognised this: "[Dawson was] a man of extraordinary gifts with a palatial mind and great depth of tenderness as a person".

== Portraits of Dawson ==
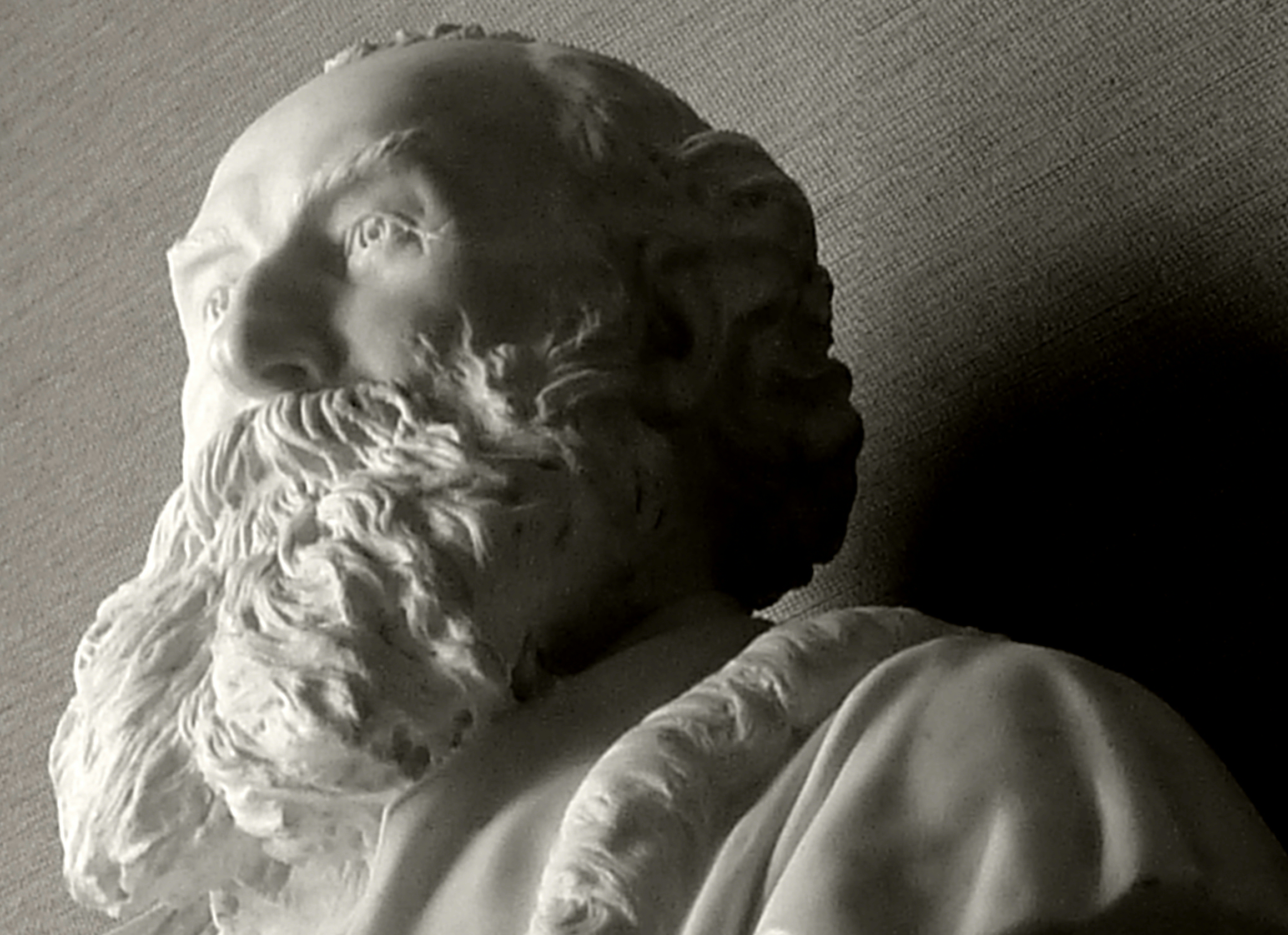
George Dawson by Webber, 1889

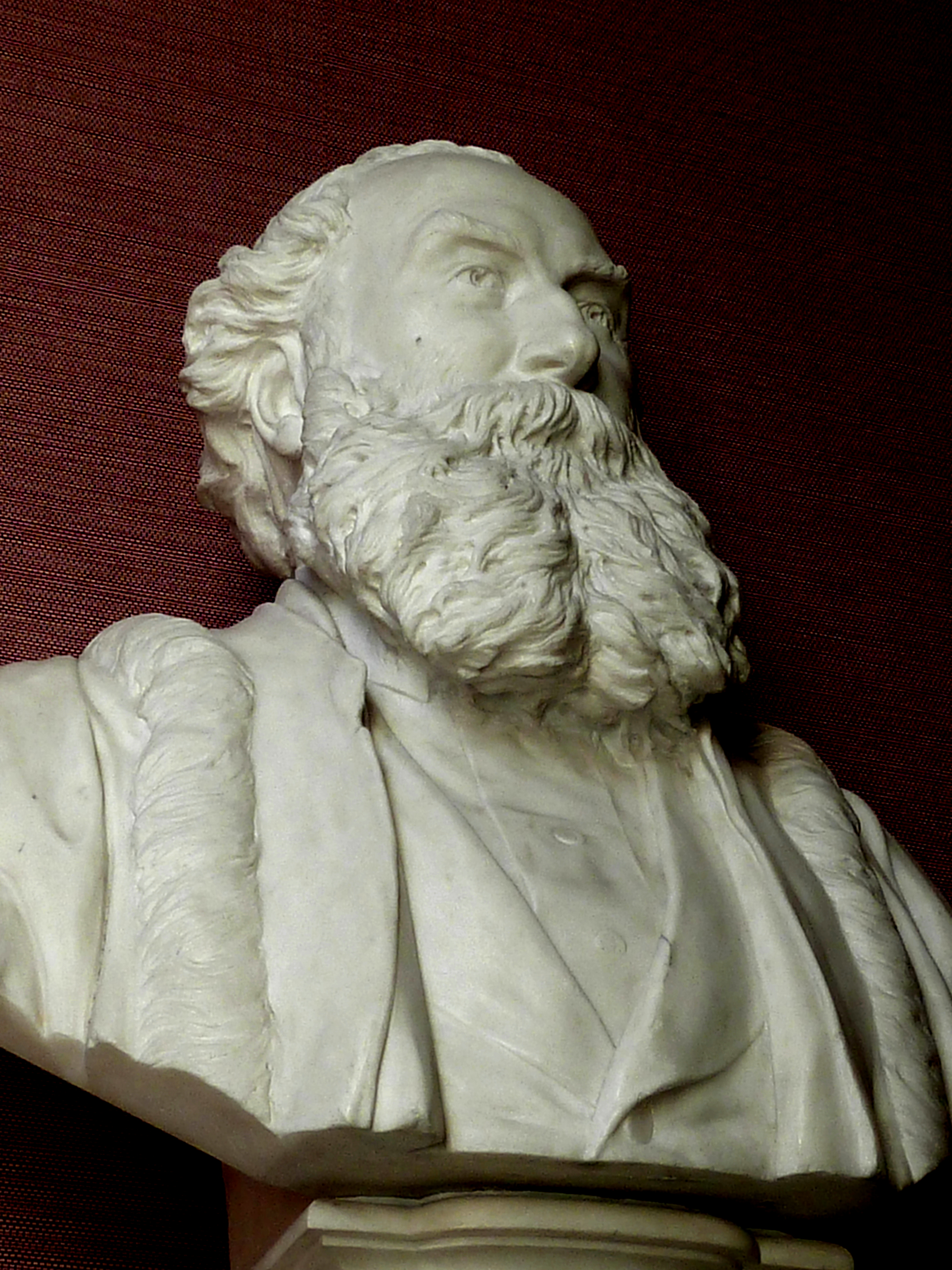
George Dawson by Webber, 1889

During 1889, the last year of Dawson's life, William John Seward Webber completed a marble bust of Dawson, and possibly also of his wife. The bust of Dawson demonstrates that, even towards the end of his life, Dawson still sported "showy, elaborate whiskers", and he chose to model for the bust in his alderman's robe. The bust was shown at the Royal Academy Summer Exhibition in 1891, and then given to Harrogate Corporation. As of 2014 the bust was in the possession of Harrogate Borough Council, which also has a painting of Dawson.
