= Rogers' Almshouses =

Historic building in England

Coordinates: 53°59′24″N 1°32′16″W

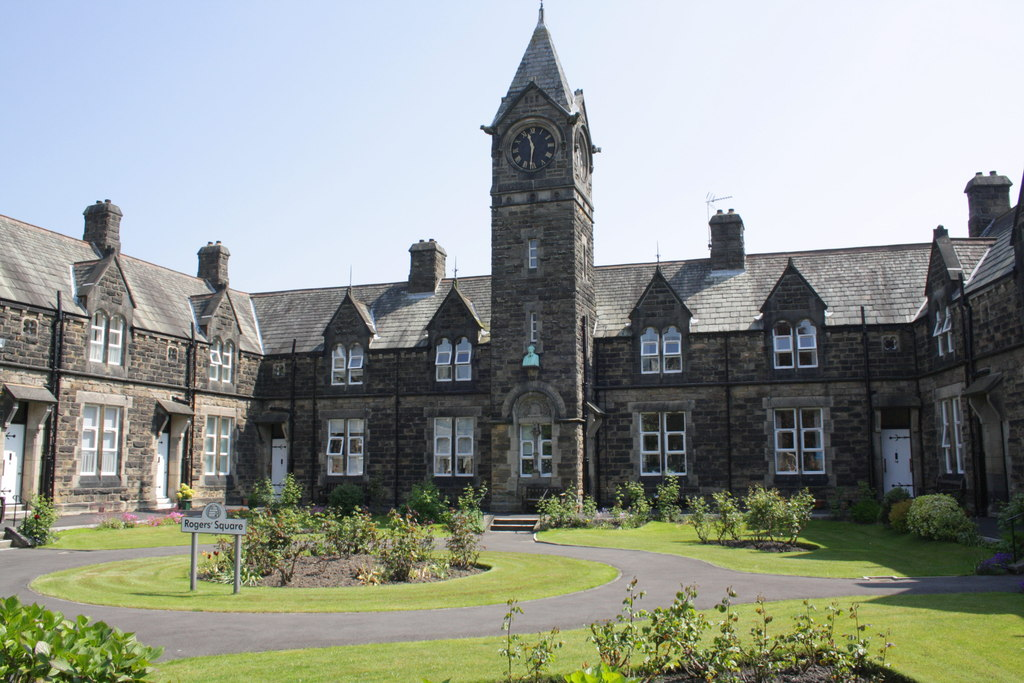
The building, in 2012

Rogers' Almshouses are a historic building in Harrogate, a town in North Yorkshire, in England.

The twelve almshouses were commissioned by George Rogers and built on a site now known as Rogers' Square. They were designed by William Andrews and Joseph Pepper and were completed in 1868. The almshouses were refurbished in 1992, by which time there were 14 retirement homes, and in 2018 the central garden was relandscaped. In 2021, the almshouses were configured to provided 15 properties. They are available to residents of Harrogate or Bradford who are at least 60 years old. The building was grade II listed in 1975.

The almshouses are built of rusticated gritstone, with a string course, a bracketed eaves course, and slate roofs with coped gables. They have two storeys, in three ranges, around a courtyard. In the centre of the main range is a four-storey clock tower, with a two-light window in the ground floor in an arched recess with a carved tympanum, and a hood mould with an inscription. Above is a bust of the founder, loop windows, gabled clock faces and a pyramidal roof. The windows are paired casements, those in the lower floor with splayed reveals, and in the upper floor with trefoil heads and gables. The doorways are recessed, with fanlights, and bracketed hoods.

== See also ==
- Listed buildings in Harrogate (Low Harrogate Ward)
