= Hales Bar =

Pub in Harrogate, North Yorkshire, England

Coordinates: 53°59′38″N 1°32′48″W

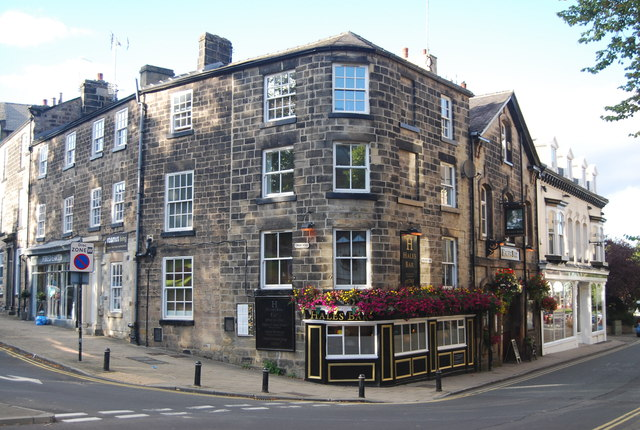
The pub, in 2014

Hales Bar is a pub in Harrogate, a town in North Yorkshire, in England.

The Promenade Inn, one of the first in the town, opened before 1766, when Tobias Smollett visited, later setting scenes in his novel The Expedition of Humphry Clinker in the pub. Two centuries later, some scenes in Chariots of Fire were also set in the pub. Despite its name, the building never served as a coaching inn. The building was reconstructed in about 1827. It was extended to the east in the 1856, and the older section was converted into a house. The pub was renamed "Hodgson's Bar" after its new landlord, and then in 1882 was renamed "Hales Bar" after his successor, William Hales. Part of the house was reconverted into the Vaults Bar in the 1960s, and the original Hales Bar was enlarged. The pub was refurbished in 2013. The building was grade II listed in 1975, and it has a two-star listing on the National Inventory of Historic Pub Interiors.

The building lies on a corner site. It is built of gritstone with a slate roof. It has three storeys, two bays, one bay in the return, a bowed bay on the corner, and a three-bay gabled extension. In the original part is a public house front with pilasters and an entablature, and recessed sash windows. The extension has two storeys and an attic, and the entrance and windows have segmental heads and keystones. Inside, it retains gas lamps, a Victorian counter with two cigar lighters and a water tap, and a contemporary bar back with eight vats for spirits.

== See also ==
- Listed buildings in Harrogate (Low Harrogate Ward)
