= Harrogate War Memorial =

Outdoor, stone war memorial in England

- Harrogate Cenotaph
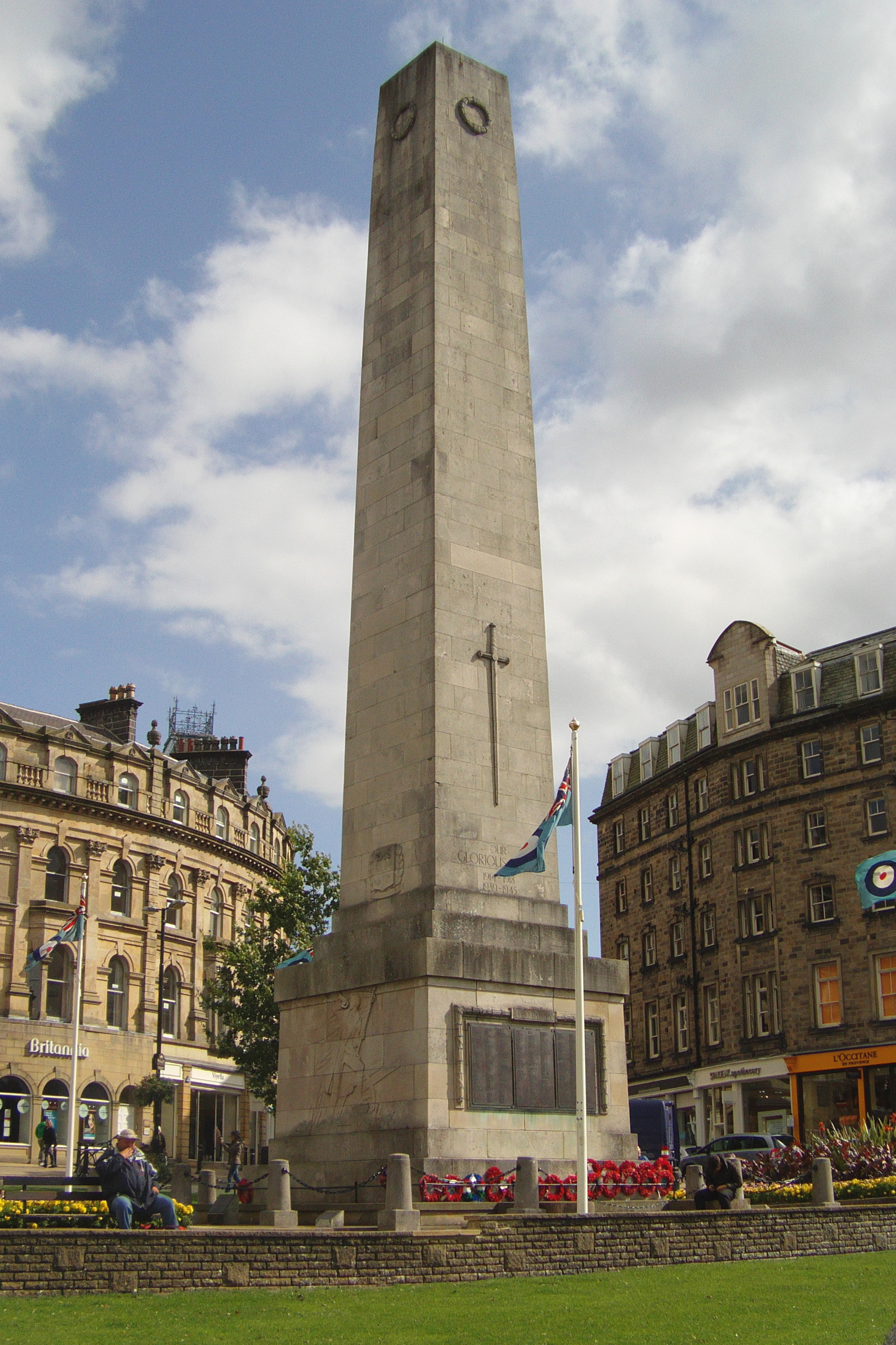
- Interactive map of Harrogate War Memorial
- Location: Prospect Square, Harrogate, North Yorkshire, England
- Coordinates: 53°59′34″N 01°32′31″W
- Designer: Ernest Prestwich
- Type: Obelisk
- Material: Portland stone and bronze
- Height: 75 feet (23 m)
- Completion date: 1923
- Opening date: 1 September 1923
- Dedicated to: The fallen of the First and Second World Wars
- Website: ww1-yorkshires.org

Harrogate War Memorial, also known colloquially as Harrogate Cenotaph, in Harrogate, North Yorkshire, England, was designed by Ernest Prestwich and unveiled by Henry Lascelles, 5th Earl of Harewood in 1923, in the presence of 10,000 people. It was said to be one of the last of England's outdoor war memorials to be unveiled, following the First World War.

The monument is formed of an obelisk and plinth in Portland stone, and is 23 metres (75 feet) tall. It carries two large bronze plaques, containing 1,163 names of Harrogate casualties of the First and Second World Wars, including several women. It is decorated in bas relief by sculptor Gilbert Ledward, with two murals titled 1914, the Call to Arms, and 1918, Britannia with the Flag of Victory. In preparation for the monument's 2023 centenary, the details of all 1,163 war casualties were researched by two members of Harrogate Civic Society. It was found that over 300 of the dead had unknown graves, and that the youngest to die in action was aged 15.

== History ==
This is a war memorial, not a cenotaph, because according to historian Terry-Mike Williams the "definition of cenotaph is an empty tomb", and this monument is not associated with any kind of tomb. It is a "statement of memory", which is now a Grade II* listed building.

Harrogate war memorial, which stands in Prospect Square, Harrogate, was designed by Ernest Prestwich in 1922, with sculpture by Gilbert Ledward, When Prestwich won the design competition for the monument on 16 January 1922, Alderman J. Houfe said of the council's decision: "there could be no question that the design stood out amongst the 80 sent in. The simplicity of the design added to the value". The original cost estimate was £5,000 (equivalent to £261,412.64 in 2025), and the council struggled to raise the funds. Councillor Sir Henry Fleming donated 100 guineas (equivalent to £5,489.67 in 2025) towards the build. It was ultimately completed at a cost of £12,000 (equivalent to £627,390.33 in 2025). Prestwich's winning design called for Darley Dale white stone, although the memorial was built in Purbeck stone.

By the time the ground was broken for the build, the estimated cost had risen to £10,000 (equivalent to £522,825.28 in 2025). The Minister for Education and MP for Ripon, Major Edward Wood, laid the foundation stone on 2 June 1922, in front of the mayor and corporation and a large crowd. In his speech, Wood said that "the men staked everything for the high price of honour and the country's liberty, and in so doing left behind an abiding inspiration of the power of steadfast loyalty and self-sacrificing service". It took a long time to build this monument, it being "of so elaborate a nature". By early May 1923, the build was nearing completion, with an expectation that its grounds would be laid out by the summer. However, following the First World War, it was "one of the last to reach completion", and its opening ceremony attracted "one of the largest gatherings ever seen in Harrogate".

=== Unveiling ceremony ===
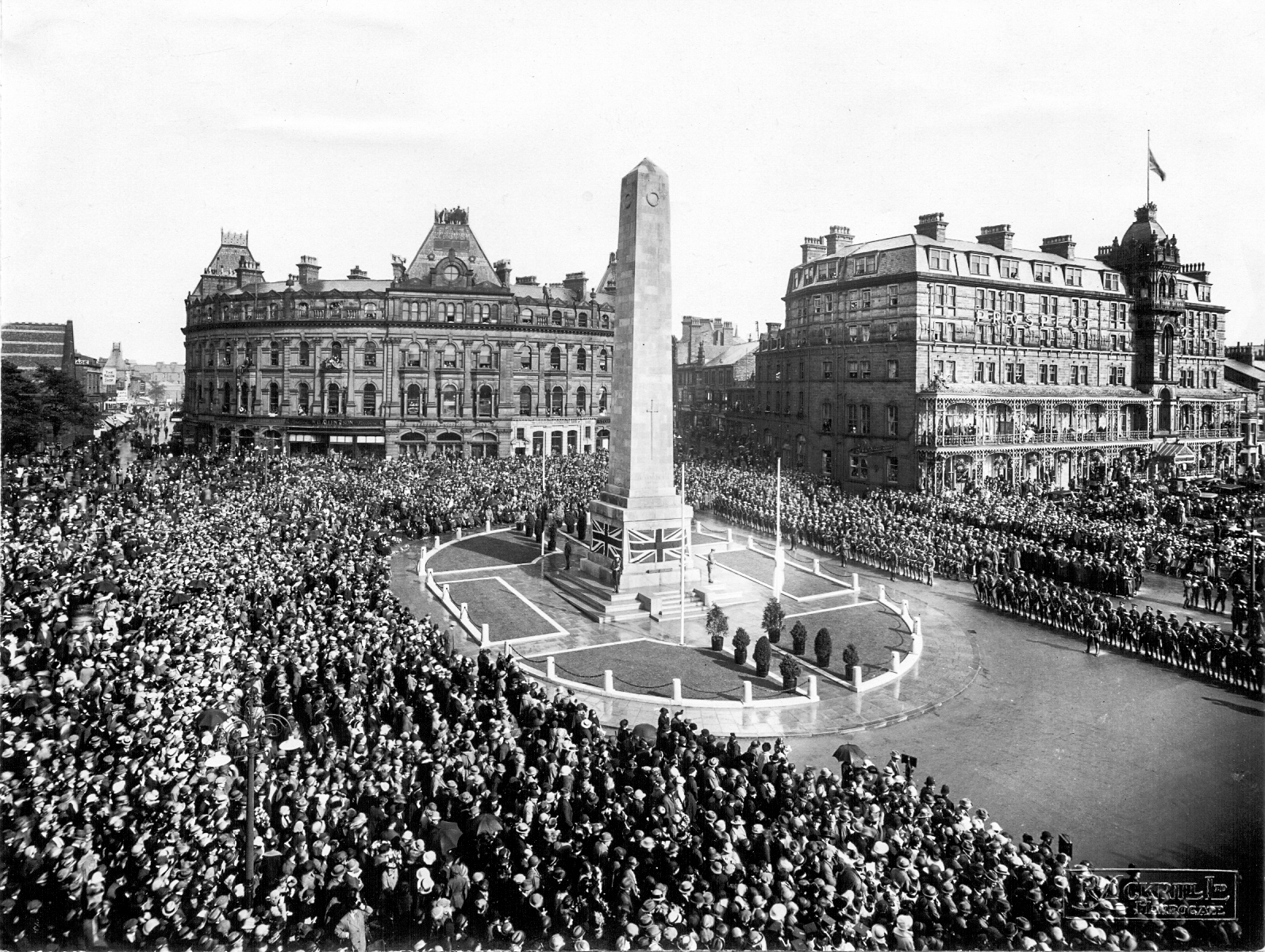
Unveiling ceremony, 1 September 1923

The unveiling ceremony of the monument occurred on 1 September 1923, in weather described by The Leeds Mercury as "weeping skies with spells of bright sunshine", with "rumbles of distant thunder". The ceremony began with a procession which included the mayor (David Simpson) and corporation, and contingents of the military: the Royal Air Force, the Yorkshire Hussars, the band of the 5th Battalion West Yorkshire Regiment (York) with its regimental colours, and "naval officers and men from HMS Adamant and the 2nd Submarine Flotilla". At the corners of the monument's pedestal were stationed "four non-commissioned officers of the Navy, Yorkshire Hussars, Infantry, and Royal Air Force". Massed choirs, accompanied by the Municipal Orchestra, sang the hymn, "The Supreme Sacrifice".

Although the first choice was at one point the Prince of Wales, in the event the monument was unveiled by Henry Lascelles, 5th Earl of Harewood, and dedicated by the Bishop of Ripon. This took place in the presence of Lascelles' daughter-in-law, Mary, Princess Royal and Countess of Harewood, his son Henry, Viscount Lascelles, and 10,000 people. In his speech, Harewood said that about a quarter of those who enlisted in Harrogate were killed, including four women. Wreaths were laid, and the military marched past, saluting the monument. The Leeds Mercury reported that, "as the buglers sounded the 'Last Post', the rain fell heavily". It rained during the one-minute's silence, then the "Reveille" was sounded. At the end of the ceremony, the public filed past, to look at the new bronze plaques, and the large number of wreaths and flowers which had been laid.

== Description ==
In 1923, The Westminster Gazette described the war memorial as "one of the finest in the country and worthy of the town". The structure is of Portland stone, and its lists of the fallen of the First and Second World Wars are inscribed on bronze plaques on the west and east sides. It is designed as a large obelisk on a low platform, surrounded closely by bollards, which originally formed a wide circle around the monument. It is ornamented with shallow relief carvings, in the modernist style. At the tops of all four sides of the obelisk a laurel wreath is carved. At the bases of the north and south sides are Harrogate's coat of arms, and on the east and west sides are Swords of Sacrifice.

The obelisk stands on a plinth, which carries the Roll of Honour on the east and west sides. On the north side of the plinth is carved 1914, the Call to Arms, featuring a bareheaded soldier with field gun, flag and bugle, above a trench. Bayonets point out of the trench, as his compatriots prepare to go over the top. On the south side of the plinth is carved 1918, Britannia with the Flag of Victory, holding the Sword of Sacrifice and wearing the Union Flag as a cloak. First World War soldiers of both sides, both sad and victorious, deploy bayonets and rifles or die at her feet, while above their heads is the Dove of Peace. The monument is 23 metres (75 feet) tall.

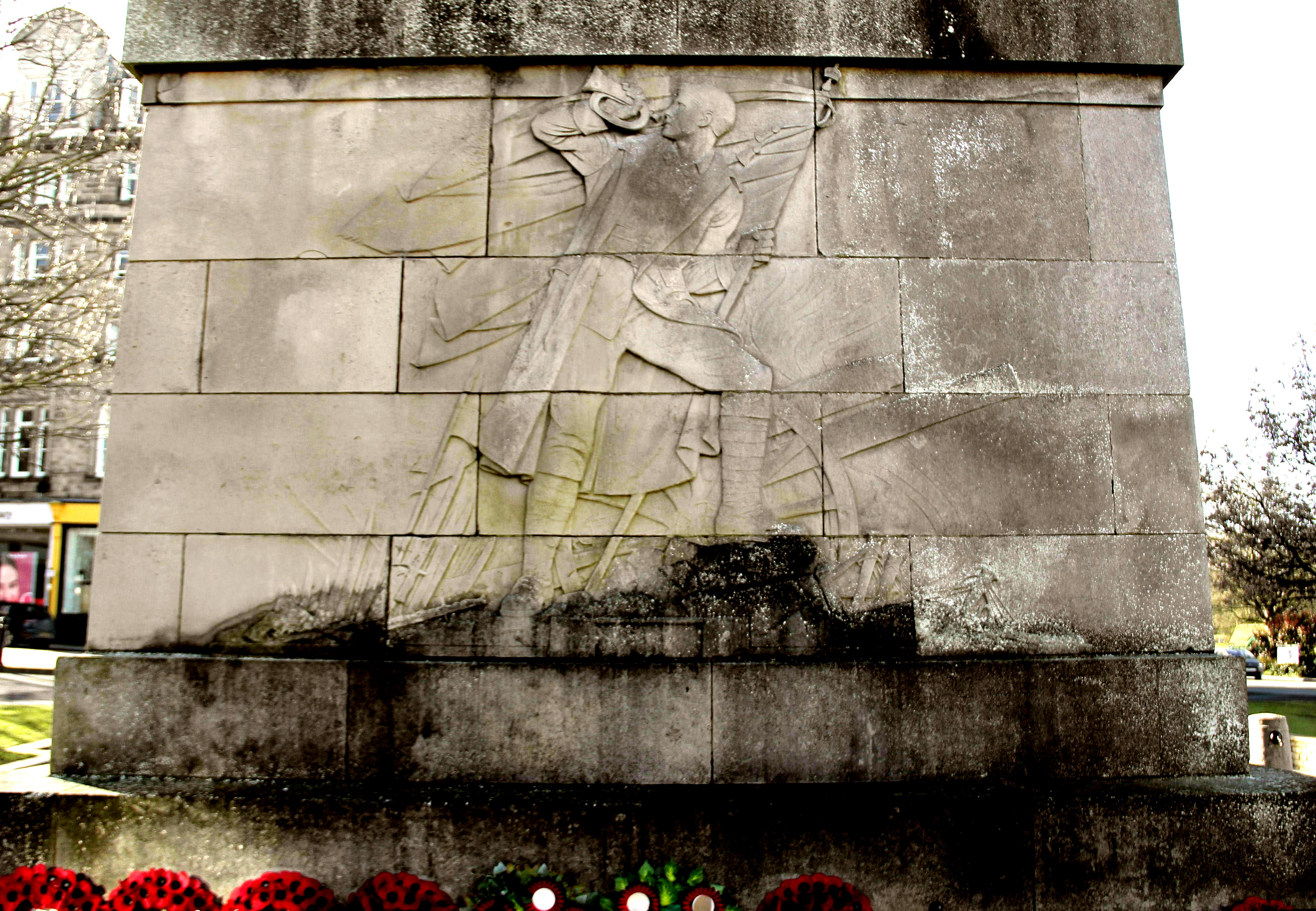
1914, the Call to Arms

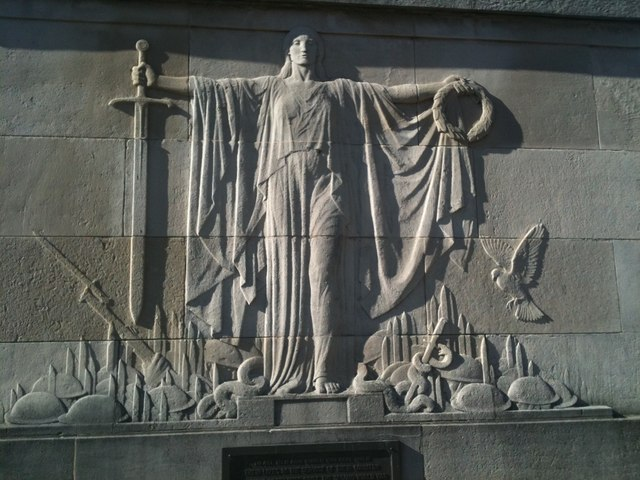
1918, Britannia with the Flag of Victory

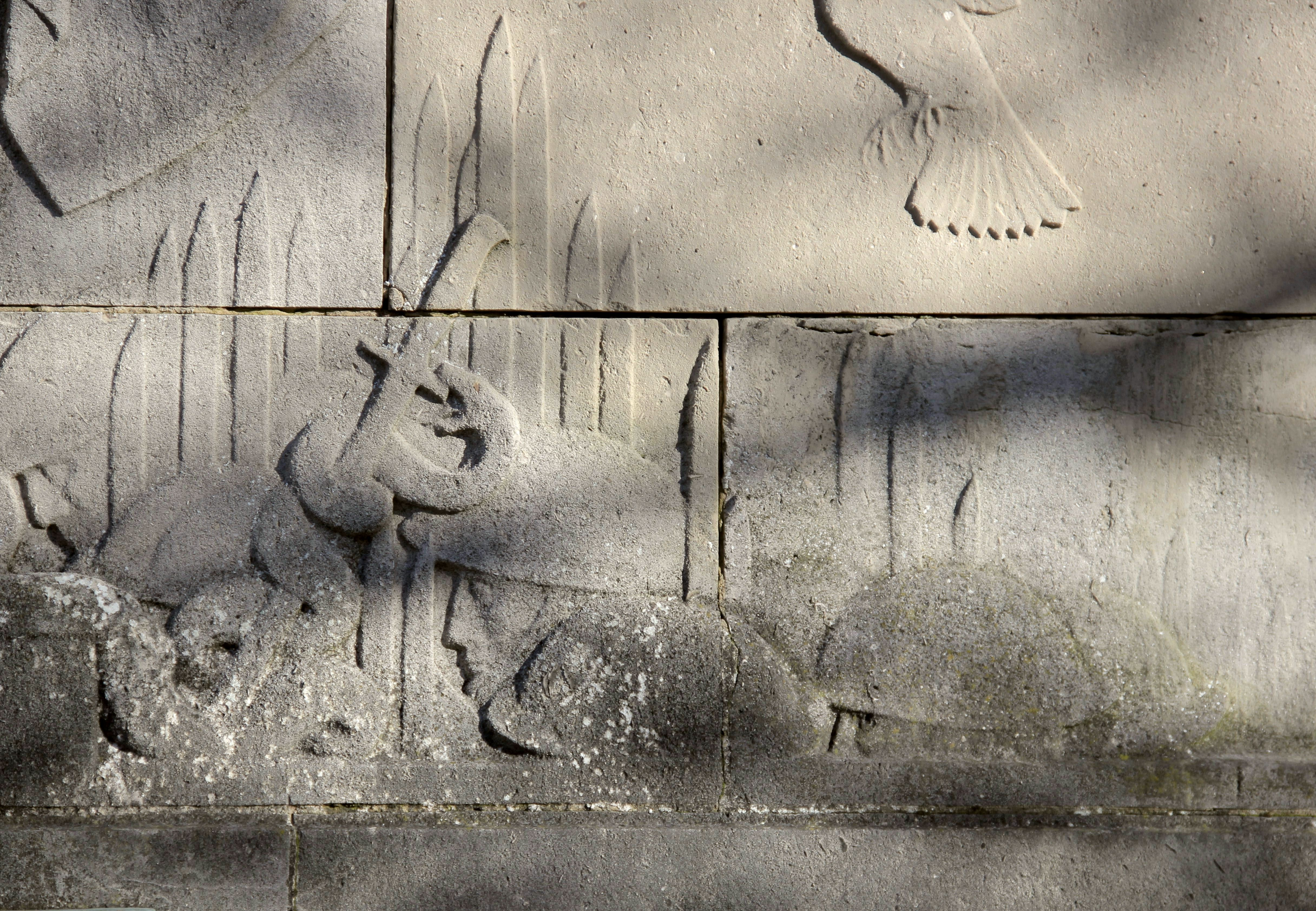
Rod of Asclepius

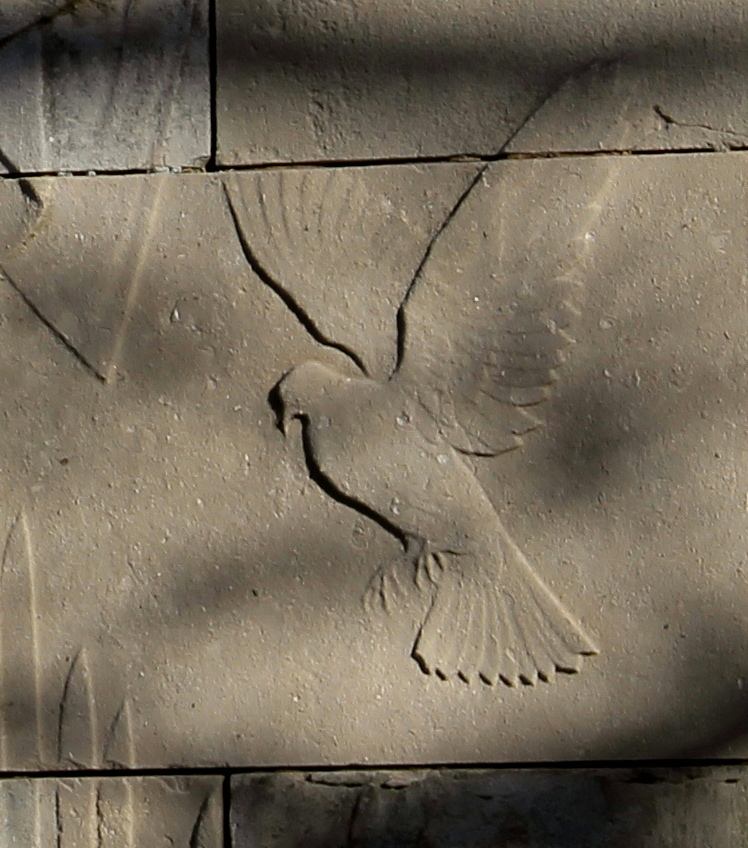
Dove of Peace

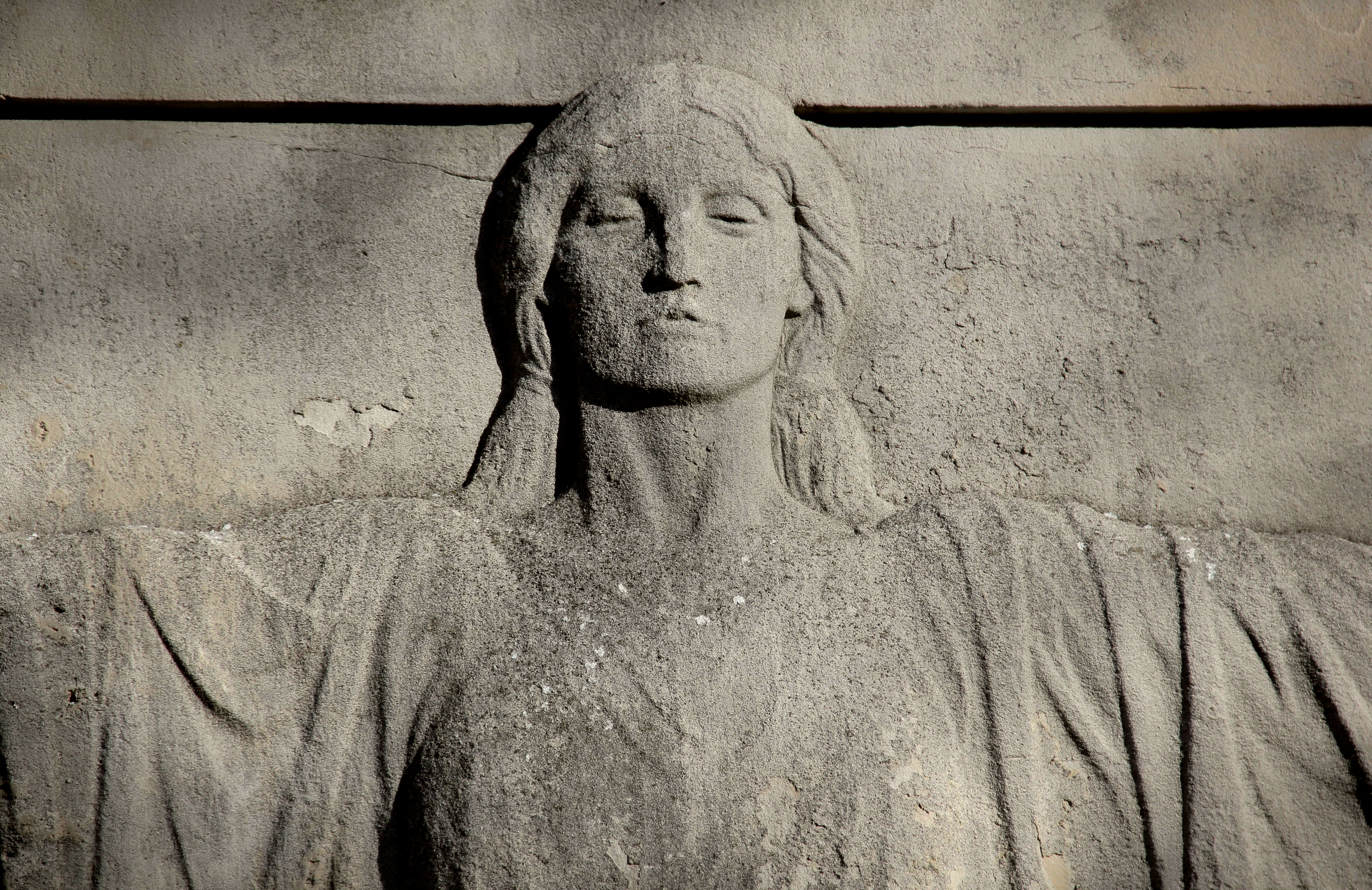
Britannia

=== Roll of Honour ===
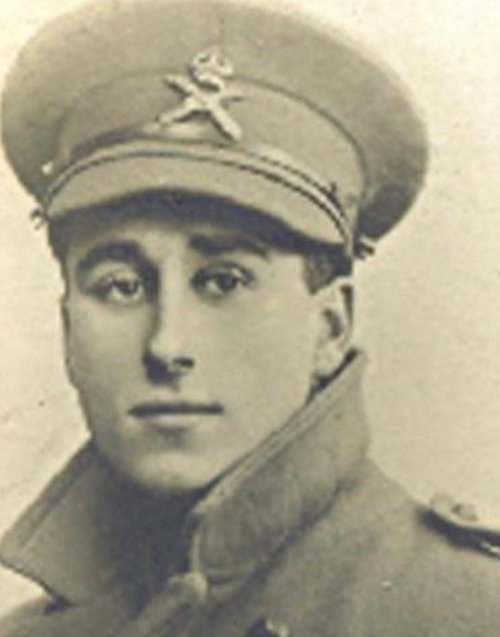
Walter Frederick Ogden, listed on the Roll of Honour

The two bronze plaques with the Roll of Honour for the First World War were replaced with two plaques listing the Fallen for both the First and Second World Wars in 1948. The Second World War list includes some Auxiliary Territorial Service workers. The lists of the fallen of both wars include some women, such as a munitions worker, a Queen Mary's Army Auxiliary Corps volunteer, a YMCA volunteer, a Women's Land Army volunteer, and a nurse. The monument also holds a plaque dedicated to those Harrogate people who won the Victoria Cross, and to those who died in service after the Second World War. The youngest of the named servicemen was aged 15 years when he died. More than three hundred of those who died in service in the First World War have no known graves.

According to Harrogate Civic Society, the total number of those named on the plaques, who died in both wars, is 1,163. Nine of those served in the Yorkshire Regiment. Around the foot of the monument are separate plaques, dedicated to individuals from Harrogate who died in war. These include Donald Simpson Bell, V.C., and Charles Hull, V.C.

== Legacy ==
The unveiling ceremony was filmed, and in 1923 the film was said to have been put away for future use. The Leeds Mercury published the following:

Harrogate: film for posterity. The Mayor of Harrogate, Mr D. Simpson, has secured the 500 feet (152.40 metres) film of the opening of the Harrogate War Memorial, and it is to be housed at the Free Library for the use of future generations. This is the first local film to be handed to the town for the benefit of posterity.

== Centenary ==
In 2023, Harrogate celebrated the centenary of its war memorial. The commemoration began at 11 a.m. on 1 September, when the "Last Post" was sounded at the memorial site, before a short service was led by a former Yorkshire Regiment chaplain, Padre Ben Norton. Following the service at the monument, there followed a commemoration and blessing service at West Park United Reformed Church. The centenary celebration was launched by Second World War veteran Sheila Pantin, then aged 99, "one of the first British servicewomen to enter a concentration camp in April 1945".

Between September and November of that year, Harrogate Civic Society showed two films, gave fourteen illustrated talks and tours, mounted a More than a Name on a Memorial exhibition, and shared their research on all 1,163 First and Second World War names inscribed on the monument. Graham Roberts and Terry-Mike Williams took five years between them to research the 1,163 names on the memorial plaques, and they caught the attention of ITN News. For the centenary, Harrogate Film Society showed early 20th-century films of Yorkshire, from the Yorkshire Film Archives, at the Harrogate Odeon.

== See also ==
- Listed buildings in Harrogate (Low Harrogate Ward)
