= Harrogate Carnegie Library =

Public library in Harrogate, North Yorkshire, England

Harrogate Library
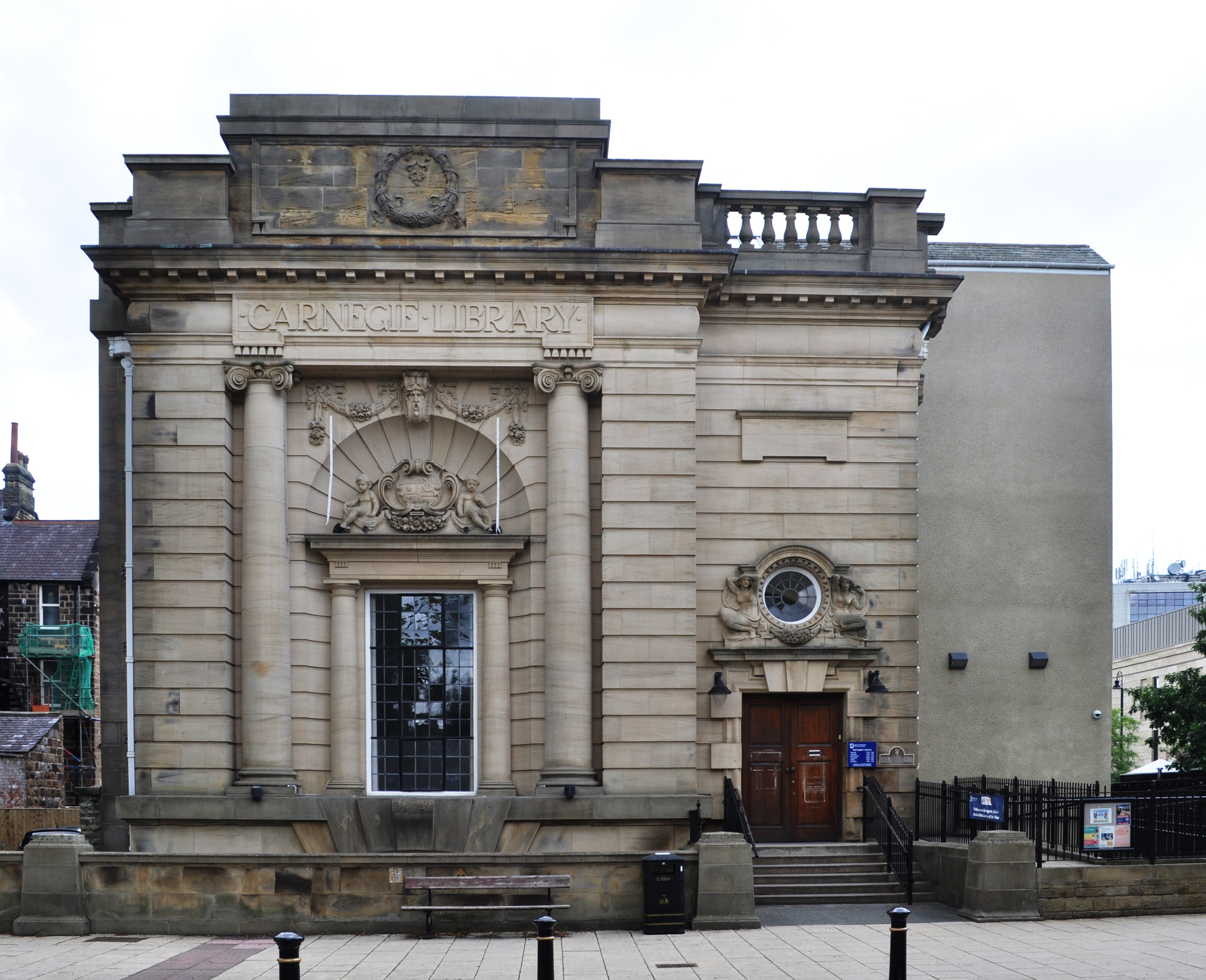
- The library from the south in 2023
- 53.9910°N 1.5387°W
- Location: Victoria Avenue, Harrogate HG1 1EG, England
- Type: Public library
- Established: 24 January 1906
- Architect: Henry Thomas Hare
- Branch of: North Yorkshire Libraries

Other information
- Website: Home Page

Harrogate Library (or, more formally, Harrogate Carnegie Library) is a Grade II listed public library in Harrogate, England.

== Previous libraries in Harrogate ==
The Carnegie Library had several predecessors as Harrogate's library. According to historian Malcolm Neesam, the bookseller Eli Hargrove was running a subscription library from before 1775, on Park Parade, opposite the Granby. It was a facility for visitors, who could afford to pay five shillings per year (equivalent to £34.92 in 2025) for the privilege of borrowing. The first free library in Harrogate may have been a collection of 182 religious works given by Miss Mary Richmond of Hull to be housed and managed by Isabella Dunn of Westmoreland in 1828.

The first attempt to form a mechanics' institute in Harrogate was the formation of a Mechanics and Literary Institution before 1839, though it was forced to close in the mid 1840s because of lack of support, poor management, and an unsuitable location.

The movement for a mechanics' institute in Harrogate was revived by George Linnaeus Banks, a minor poet and editor of the Harrogate Advertiser (a publication which the library has indexed since the 1960s) who established a new institute on James' street. The majority of Banks' new institute's patrons were middle- and lower-class. Most paid a subscription of six shillings per year which entitled them to full participation in the affairs of the institute. Some were honorary members, paying a rate of ten shillings and sixpence, while others paid over five pounds for a lifetime membership. The institute offered lectures in various fields and classes in "elementary subjects" and drawing, with the purpose of the institute argued to be the provision of activities in the winter and a smattering of culture for the growing population. The institute was later expanded with a reading room, which provided two daily newspapers, eight weekly newspapers, and some monthly periodicals. By 1855, the library had a stock of 1400. Eventually, due to the inadequate premises and insufficient membership fees, the institute closed in 1857.

Following an article in the Harrogate Advertiser in 1863 calling for a similar service, the Working Men's Club and Institute was introduced; this merged with the remnants of the mechanics institute, taking over its library and creating a substitute for its lecture programme in which short readings from books were accompanied by musical performances, which was well-received according to a favourable review in the Harrogate Advertiser. However the progress was not straightforward, since Robert Ackrill, owner of the Advertiser, wanted to merge the Working Men's Club with the Christian and Literary Institute, and that suggestion met with some opposition, before the amalgamation with the Mechanics' Institute was resolved.

In 1887, a rate-supported library was established in Harrogate following a campaign from citizens including Mr Charles Fortune, who led a discussion in the Harrogate Literary Society on whether Harrogate ought to adopt the Public Libraries Acts. After the acts were incorporated in 1886, a public reading room opened at Fern Villa in Princes Street, with a lending library added later with a collection of 2,100 volumes and 63 newspapers and periodicals, later expanding from many gifts including 132 volumes from the Harrogate Literary Society. The building soon became unable to support the demand for the services, moving through a number of places including a site between Victoria Avenue and Raglan Street, until it found its permanent home on Victoria Avenue.

== Foundation of Harrogate Carnegie Library ==
Harrogate Carnegie Library is named after its sponsor, Andrew Carnegie, who donated £7,500 for the building's construction in 1904. It is one of over 600 libraries funded by Carnegie's donations.

The building was designed by Henry T. Hare as part of a larger "municipal palace", but only the library building was ever built. The foundation stone was laid on 17 October 1904 by Alderman Horace Milling JP, Mayor of Harrogate. The library was opened on 24 January 1906 by the Rt Rev G. W. Kennion, Bishop of Bath and Wells, as commemorated by a plaque on the site.

== Early history ==
The lending library initially ran on an "indicator charging" system. Unlike today's open-access model, this system required patrons to choose books by consulting a catalogue. The library switched to the open-access system in 1909, becoming the third library in Yorkshire to do so. Soon after, it began working with libraries in nearby Knaresborough, Bilton, and Starbeck to provision books between each other.

The library categories books mostly using Dewey Decimal Classification, with a modification in its local history section, where class numbers are prefixed with "Y" for Yorkshire, "H" for Harrogate, and "K" (formerly "KNA") for Knaresborough.

== 2010 renovation and 2011 re-opening ==
In 2010, the North Yorkshire County Council allocated £3.4 million from the National Lottery fund to renovate the library including an expansion of over 250 square metres. As a result, the library's collection expanded by around fifty percent to a total of 73,000 books. The library was re-opened by the Duke of Gloucester in 2011. The renovation was undertaken by William Birch Construction.

== 2019 improvements ==
The library closed its doors from 19 March to 4 April 2022, for "much-needed improvements". It allowed its patrons to borrow additional books over this closure period.

== Recent history ==
In 2010, the North Yorkshire County Council cut the library's funding by £2 million in an attempt to save £168 million by 2020. In 2014, the council made a further cut of £1.6 million (from £5.8 million to £4.2 million).

In 2022, Harrogate Carnegie Library was named the most-used library in the county of North Yorkshire, with 122,409 visitors in the 2021/22 period (up from 47,809 the previous year). Patronage further rose in the 2022/23 period, with 177,629 visitors. In 2024, the library increased its overdue fees from 30p per day to 35p per day, with the council citing "increased pressure on finances" as the reason for the increase, to a maximum of £8, the first increase in over ten years, while also doubling the price to print a black-and-white A4 page, going from 10p to 20p.

== See also ==
- Listed buildings in Harrogate (Low Harrogate Ward)
