= White Hart Hotel, Harrogate =

Hotel in Harrogate, North Yorkshire, England

Coordinates: 53°59′33.4″N 1°32′45.0″W

The White Hart Hotel, Harrogate
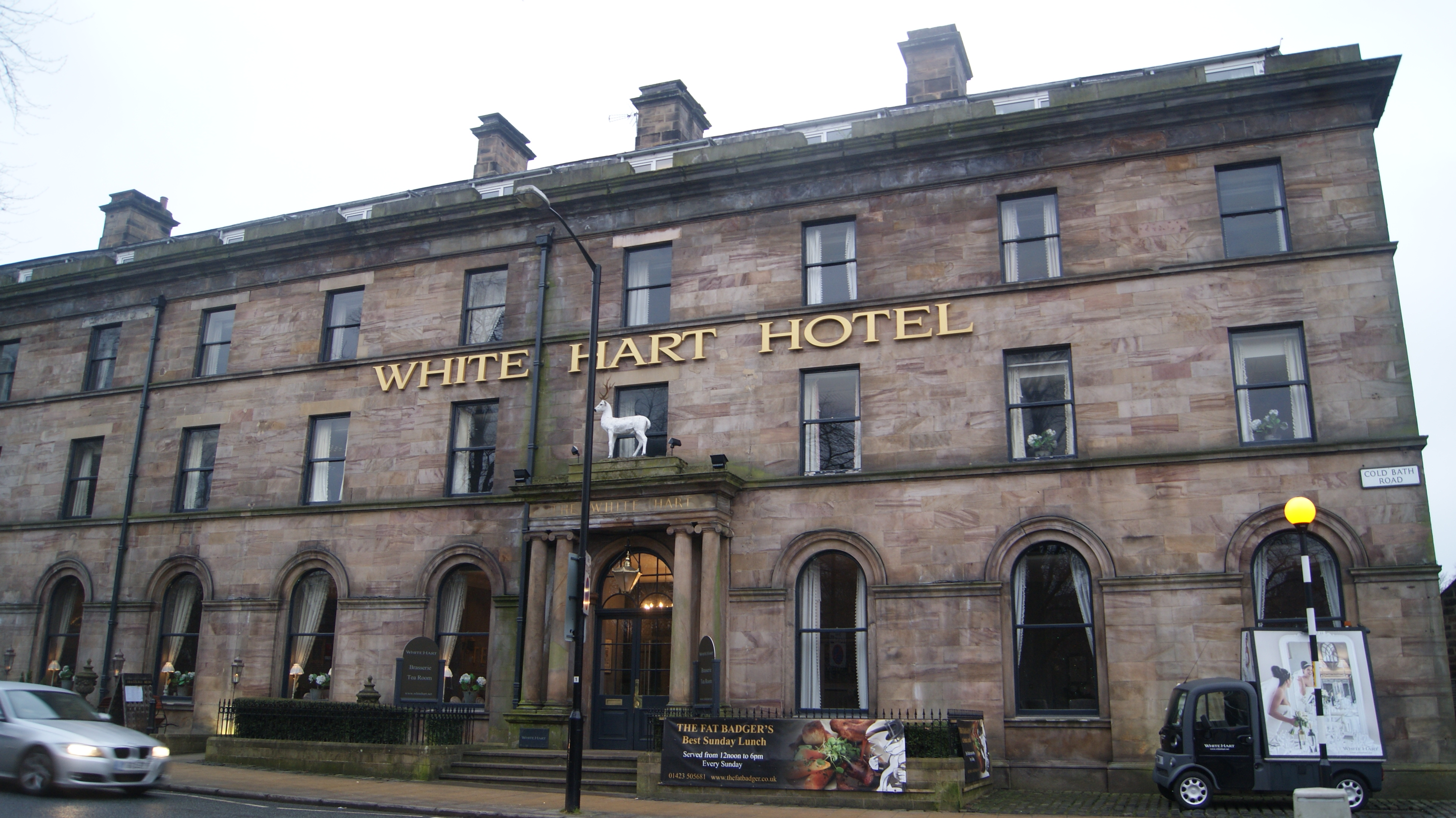
- The White Hart Hotel, Harrogate

- Location within North Yorkshire

General information
- Classification: Grade II* listed
- Completed: 1846

Design and construction
- Architect: George Townsend Andrews

The White Hart is a hotel, conference centre and grade II* listed building located in the Montpelier Quarter of Harrogate, North Yorkshire. It has served visitors to the spa town for over 250 years.

== History ==
The York Courant of 20 August 1765 contains the earliest known reference to the White Hart, which announces that "Stray'd or conveyed on the 14th August from Thomas Wray's at the White Hart in Low Harrogate, a dappled grey mare ... whoever shall give notice of the same ... 15 shillings reward and reasonable charges". It appears to have served as an inn, accommodating visitors to the sulphur wells that made Harrogate England's first spa town, and the cold well at the base of what is now Cold Bath Road. Towards the end of the 18th century, the White Hart seems to have developed as a venue for the auctioning of property, and also as an important stop on the coaching routes which linked Harrogate to the rest of the country.

In 1778, the open common known as "the Stray" lying to the immediate south of the White Hart's frontage was legally designated as common land, to remain "open and unenclosed". This was of great advantage to the White Hart, securing the inn's position overlooking to this open and attractive vista. By the end of the reign of William IV, the failure of the township authorities to properly drain and maintain the Stray led to a large pond forming outside the White Hart, with numerous ducks and geese. A late Victorian writer recalled that one of the sights of his childhood had been the arrival in Low Harrogate of the great passenger stage coaches, which splashed through the flooded road outside the White Hart, sending geese and ducks in all directions.

== Victorian redevelopment ==
As the Victorian age progressed, Harrogate's popularity as a tourist destination grew, helped both by the popularity of hydrotherapy and the development of the railway. The White Hart was ideally situated to take advantage of this increased trade, being both near to the railway station and overlooking the popular Royal Pump Room. Booming business led the White Hart's owners to build a new structure on the old site in 1846, designed by architect George Townsend Andrews. According to the distinguished architectural critic Professor Nikolaus Pevsner the rebuilt White Hart was "the best building in Harrogate" with "nothing gaudy or showy about it".

== 20th century ==
During the interwar years, the White Hart continued to accommodate general as well as spa visitors, and also developed business from the growing conference trade. Sir Arnold Bax was among the celebrated names that stayed at the White Hart during the 1929 Festival of Music. Visitors of a very different kind gathered on the Stray in front of the White Hart in 1936 when the Jarrow Crusade arrived in town, to a reception generally kind and sympathetic. The outbreak of the Second World War in 1939 saw many of Harrogate's hotels requisitioned by the government, with the White Hart being occupied by both the Air Ministry and the Ministry of Works. Within months of the finish of the war, the White Hart was acquired by the county council of the West Riding of Yorkshire. For a short time, the authority considered using the hotel as an art school, but this changed with the birth of the new National Health Service. Minister of Health Aneurin Bevan visited Harrogate, which was intended to become the British Empire's principal centre for rheumatism research and treatment, and inspected the White Hart, leading to the recommendation that it, along with the neighbouring Crown Hotel, be purchased by the state to become annexe hospitals for the Royal Baths. The very scale of the plan was responsible for its eventual abandonment, and in 1949, the White Hart passed into the hands of the Leeds Regional Hospital Board. The White Hart served as the National Health Service's only conference venue, catering to all the areas of the NHS until it was acquired by the University of York in 1988. It became a listed building in 1971.

== Present day ==
The White Hart is now privately owned, once again serving visitors to Harrogate as a hotel and conference centre. The building has undergone major refurbishments, and now includes its own restaurant area and tearoom, as well as an adjoining pub, The Fat Badger, which operates both as a hotel bar and as a pub catering to Harrogate locals. It is served by its own car park, as well as containing a gym and hair salon.

== See also ==
- Listed buildings in Harrogate (Low Harrogate Ward)
