= Wesley Chapel, Harrogate =

Nonconformist chapel in England

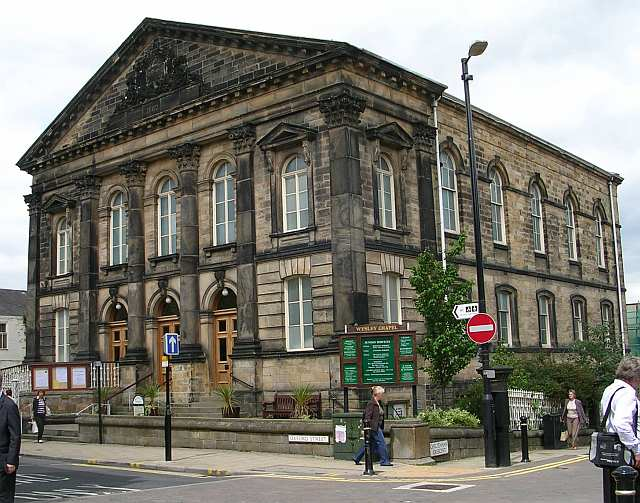
- Wesley Chapel

- Location within England
- 53°59′37.57″N 1°32′32.55″W
- Denomination: Methodist
- Website: www.wesleychapelharrogate.org.uk

Wesley Chapel, Harrogate is located on Oxford Street in Harrogate, North Yorkshire. It is a Grade II listed building.

== History ==
Wesley Chapel opened in 1862. It was built by architects Henry Francis Lockwood and William Mawson. The facade is Hexastyle Corinthian. The funeral of George Dawson was held here in 1889, because the building could accommodate the large number of mourners who followed his coffin.

== Organ ==
The church started with a 3 manual pipe organ dating from 1877 by Forster and Andrews. This was replaced in 1912 by an organ by James Jepson Binns. The specification can be found on the National Pipe Organ Register.

== See also ==
- Listed buildings in Harrogate (Low Harrogate Ward)
