= Tourelle (architecture) =

Type of turret

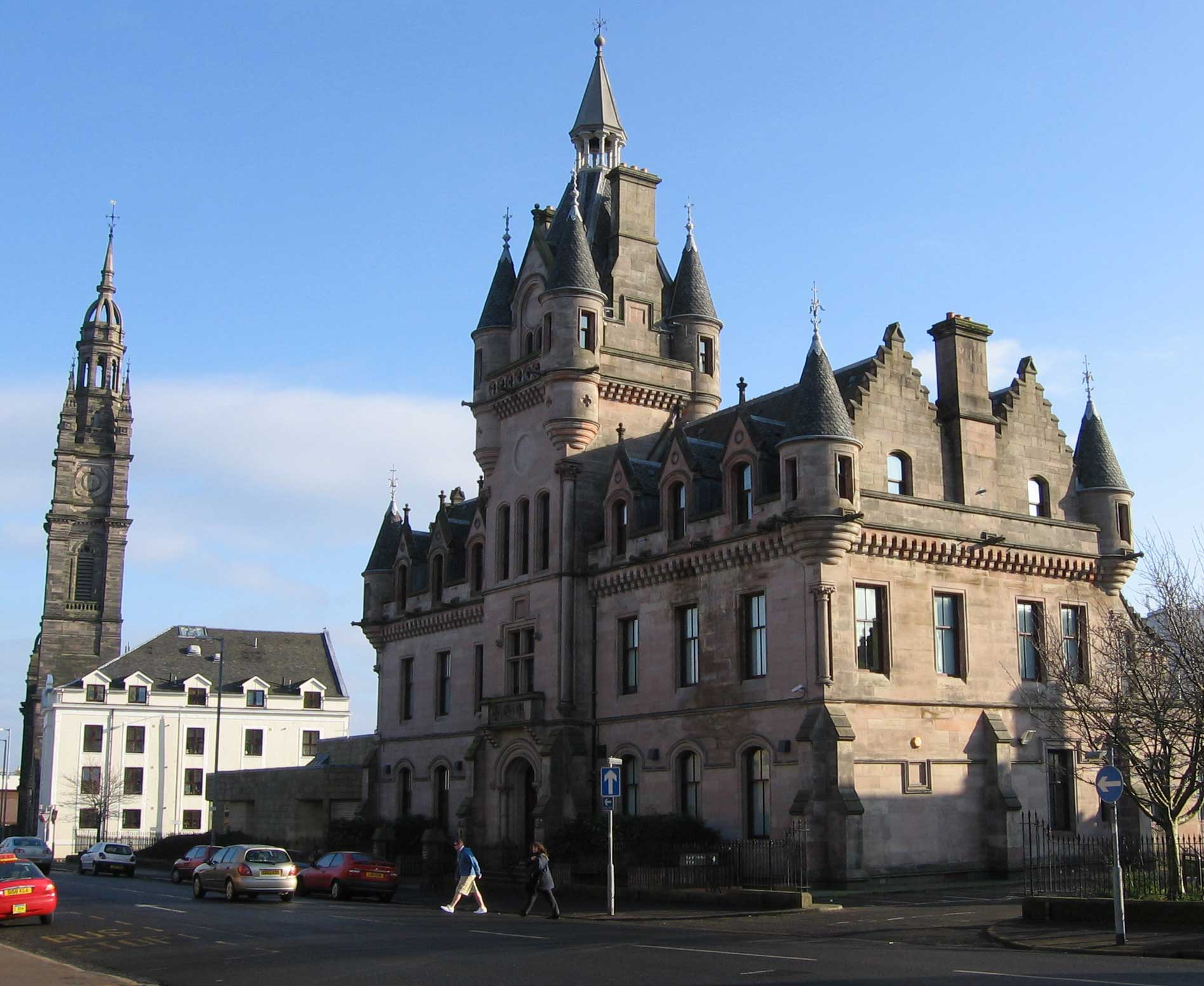
Greenock Sheriff Court (1869), with corbelled corner turrets (which may be termed "tourelles")

A tourelle is a type of turret, sometimes used in Chateauesque architecture.

A general dictionary defines tourelle as "a small tower (as one springing from corbeling or pier)".

An architectural dictionary defines it more specifically as a "corbelled turret, circular in plan, cone-roofed, sometimes containing a circular stair, set at the angle of a tower or wall at high level, and common in Scottish-Baronial architecture".

A distinction may be made between turrets that are atop corner towers going all the way down to the ground, vs. turrets that project out and up. A tourelle is the latter.
