= Thomas Holroyd =

British painter (1821–1904)

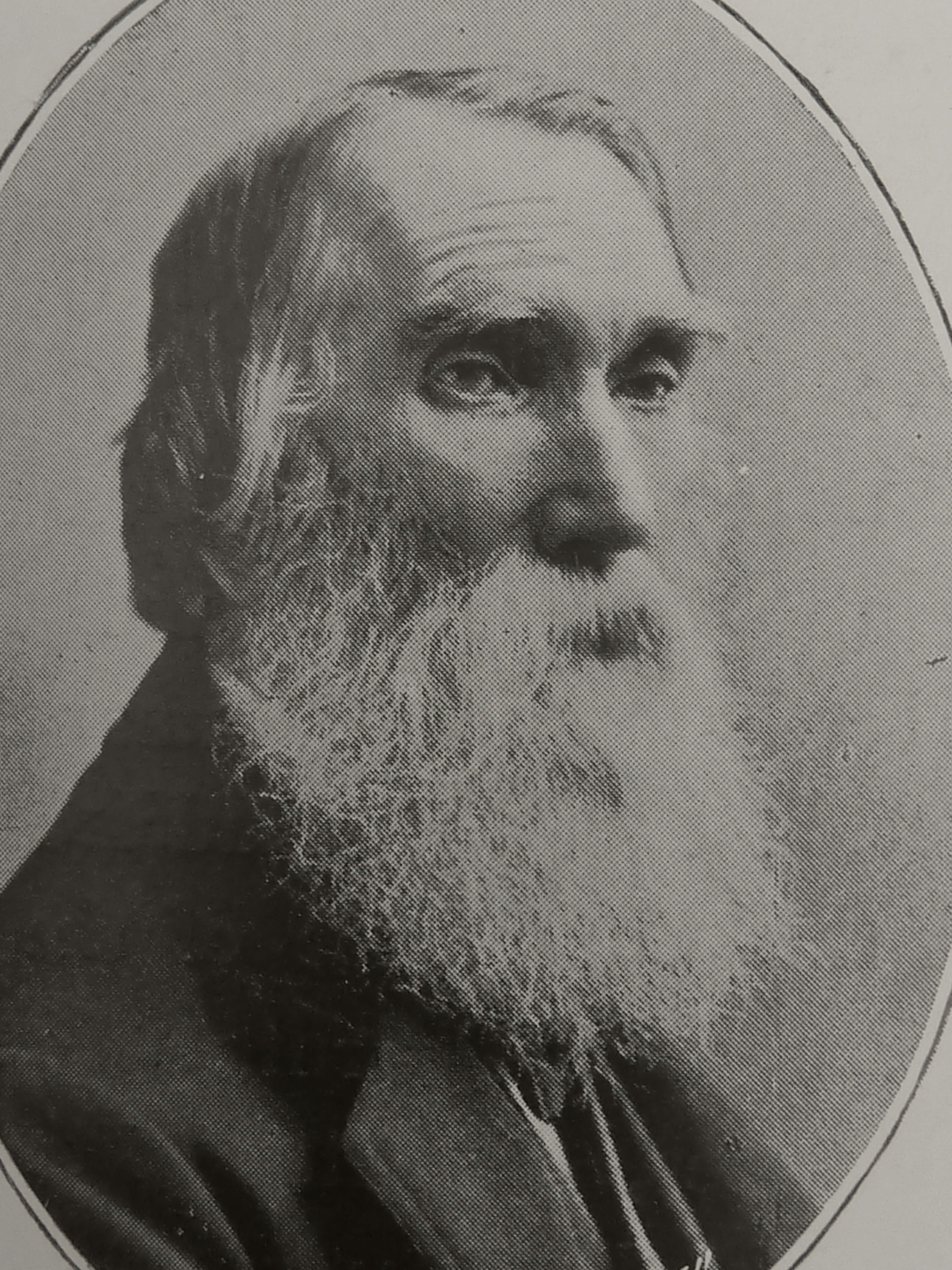
- Holroyd in the 1890s
- Born: 1821; Rastrick, England
- Died: 10 March 1904 (aged 82–83); Harrogate, England
- Resting place: Grove Road Cemetery, Harrogate
- Education: Leigh's Academy; Couture's Academy

Thomas Holroyd (1821 – 10 March 1904) was an English portrait and landscape painter working in Harrogate, North Riding of Yorkshire, England. Before his marriage he undertook painting tours to the United States, Canada, Europe, Egypt, Russia and the Holy Land. Returning to Harrogate, he painted portraits of the local worthies there. He shared responsibility for the successful photography business T & J Holroyd with his brother James, and continued to run the business after his brother died. Holroyd was a founding member of Harrogate Liberal Club.

Holroyd left to Harrogate Corporation a bequest, which included his paintings of foreign lands, some sculptures by his friend William John Seward Webber, and several vintage carved oak furniture props from the photography business.

== Life ==
Thomas Holroyd (Rastrick 1821 – Harrogate 10 March 1904) was the son of photographic artist Benjamin Holroyd (b. Huddersfield c.1789) of Rastrick, West Riding of Yorkshire. (Note: England Census 1851 Ref. HO107/2297. p.18 schedule 105 64 Little Woodhouse, Rastrick) Thomas attended the village school in Clifton, West Yorkshire, and was raised to follow the family trade, but it was his decision to study art. He was expected to join his brother James {Halifax c.1825 – Harrogate 5 June 1874) as a photographer in Harrogate, and "at one time the studios at Esplanade House had a wide reputation". However, while James was taking photographs Thomas was painting in watercolours and oils.

Holroyd trained at Leigh's Academy, London, and at Couture's Academy, Paris, and he studied in Rome for several years. He travelled, painted and sketched in most European countries, and continued to work until a few years before his death. His travels included America, and also Canada where he painted portraits of eleven Mohawk people. Beyond Europe, he visited Egypt, the Holy Land, Russia and Greece, painting as he went. In 1851, the Census finds Holroyd as a lodger in London, at the time of the Great Exhibition. He was with a contingent of Yorkshire artists, including Richard Ellis, who was at that time a cabinetmaker. In 1861 Holroyd's address was 70 Via Babuino, Rome.

On 6 November 1865, Holyroyd married Mary Asquith (Keighley c.1841 – Bradford 22 June 1889), (Note: Marriages Dec 1865 Holroyd Thomas and Asquith Mary Knaresbro 9a 170. Deaths Jun 1889 Holroyd Mary 48 Bradford, Y. 9b 104) at the former St Mary's Church, Low Harrogate. They had both been living at Esplanade House, the studio of Thomas and his brother James. They had at least three children: Frederick (born Harrogate 1866), (Note: Births Jun 1866 Holroyd Frederick Knaresbro' 9a 98) Albert (1872 – 9 April 1891), (Note: Deaths Jun 1891 Holroyd Albert 18 Knaresbro' 9a 99) and Harry (1887 – 30 January 1888). (Note: Deaths Jun 1888 Holroyd Harry 1 Huddersfield 9a 193) In 1871, Holroyd, his wife Mary, his son Frederick and his artist-photographer brother James were living in Esplanade House on The Esplanade, which later became St Mary's Walk, Harrogate. (Note: England Census 1871 RG10/4289 p.24 Esplanade House, The Esplanade) The 1881 Census finds Holroyd as a married man visiting Ventnor, Hampshire. (Note: England Census 1881 RG11/1184 p.2 Globe Hotel, Ventnor) On 22 June 1889, Holroyd's wife Mary committed suicide at the age of 48 by cutting her own throat in her bedroom while visiting 21 Victor Road, Manningham, Bradford. She had been in "depressed spirits" and had "talked of going into an asylum". In 1891 Holroyd was a widower with lodgers, living in Esplanade Cottage, St Mary's Walk, and still working as a portrait and landscape painter. (Note: England Census 1891, RG12/3519 p.13, schedule 63, Esplanade Cottage, St Mary's Walk, Harrogate.)

Holroyd was an "enthusiastic Liberal, and one of the founders of Harrogate Liberal Club".

=== Death ===
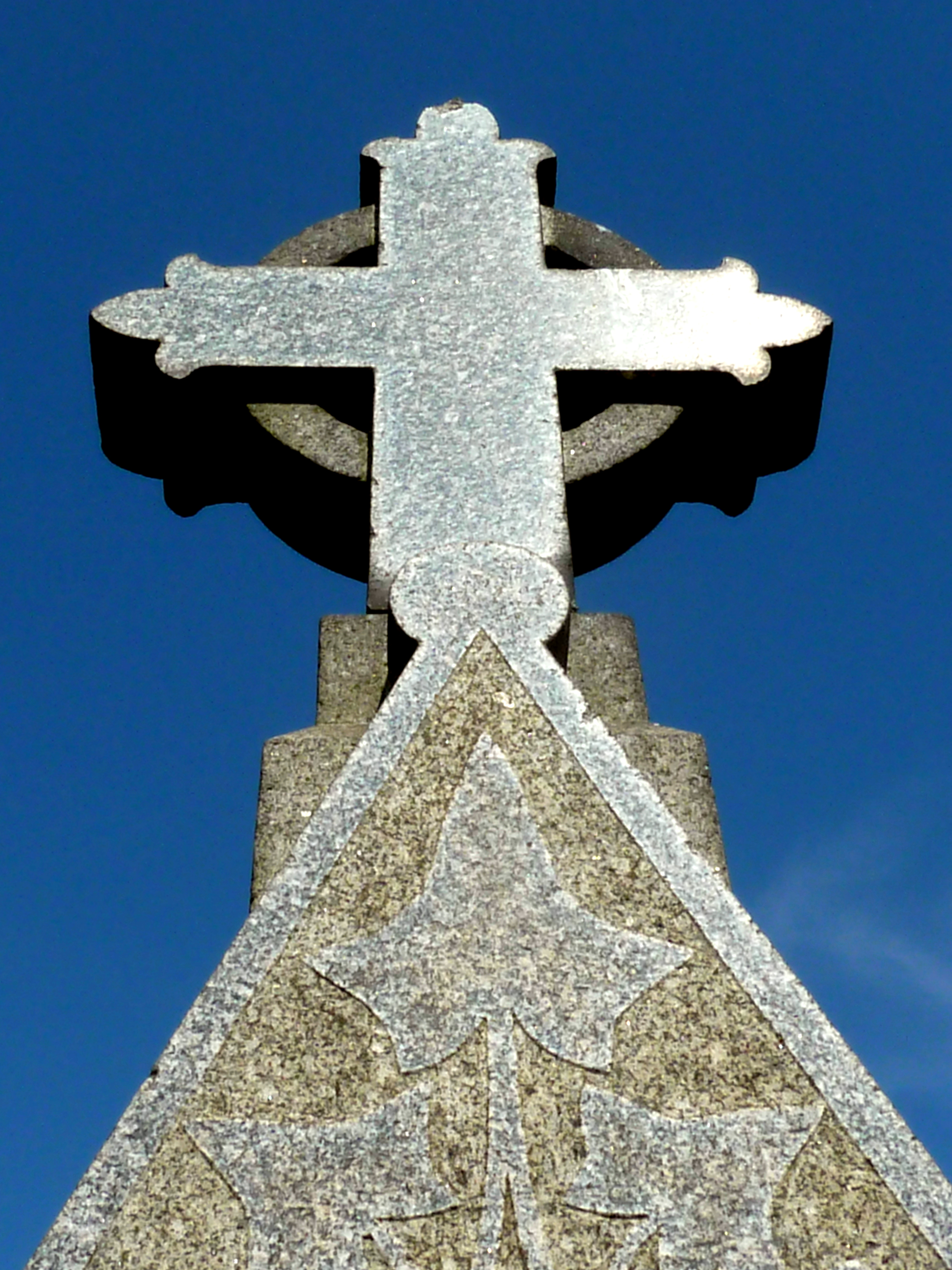
Holroyd's polished marble gravestone

Holroyd died at home in "Kirkroyd", St Mary's Walk, Harrogate, on 10 March 1904, aged 82. He was buried on a day of bad weather on 14 March 1904 in Harrogate Cemetery. (Note: Harrogate Cemetery is now known as Grove Road Cemetery, Harrogate. Holroyd is buried in plot 836, in section C of the graveyard.) As the cortege left his residence, it passed between houses whose blinds were drawn "as manifestations of sorrow and regret". Besides his son Fred Holroyd and other relatives, the interment was attended by representatives of Harrogate Corporation, and of Harrogate Liberal Club. The inscription on the polished oak coffin said, "Thomas Holroyd. Died March 10th 1904. Aged 82 years".

The Knaresborough Post described him as one of Harrogate's "oldest and most respected residents". The Pateley Bridge & Nidderdale Herald said, "In addition to his artistic taste [Holroyd] was a man of intelligence, culture and versatile talents ... [He] was always anxious for Harrogate's progression and energetic in its interests". The Yorkshire Post and Leeds Intelligencer noted: "Mr Holroyd achieved considerable distinction as an artist, and his sketches and paintings are reminiscent of almost every country in Europe through which he travelled".

=== Holroyd bequest ===
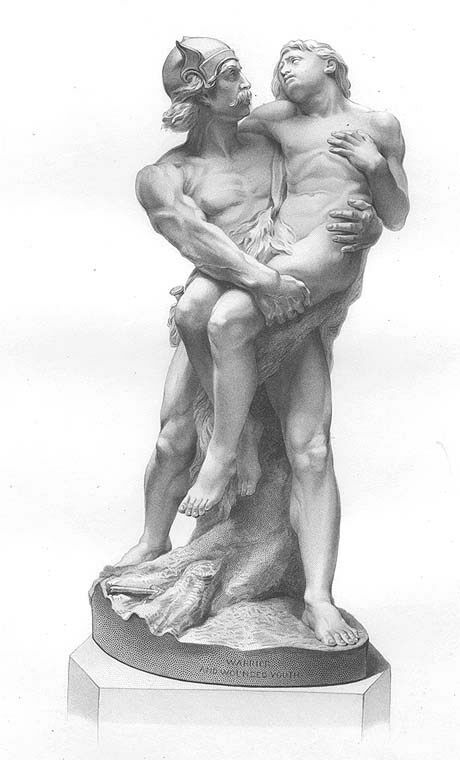
Webber's Warrior and Wounded Youth

Holroyd left his paintings, the sculptures which he owned, and his "old oak" to the Harrogate Corporation. The marble statuary included The Warrior and the Wounded Youth (1878) commissioned by Holroyd and executed by William John Seward Webber (1842–1919). (Note: See File:The Warrior and the Wounded boy by Webber.jpg.). The piece has not been retained by the Borough of Harrogate, although the Corporation formally accepted the bequest on 26 March 1904. Most of the paintings left by Holroyd were his own work. The Pateley Bridge & Nidderdale Herald reported:

They represent much of the life and character of foreign countries the artist had visited. One local picture will always be of interest. It is the representation of the first ox roasting carried out by the late Mr Samson Fox. It contains scores of full-length likenesses of prominent townspeople assembled on The Stray upon that occasion.

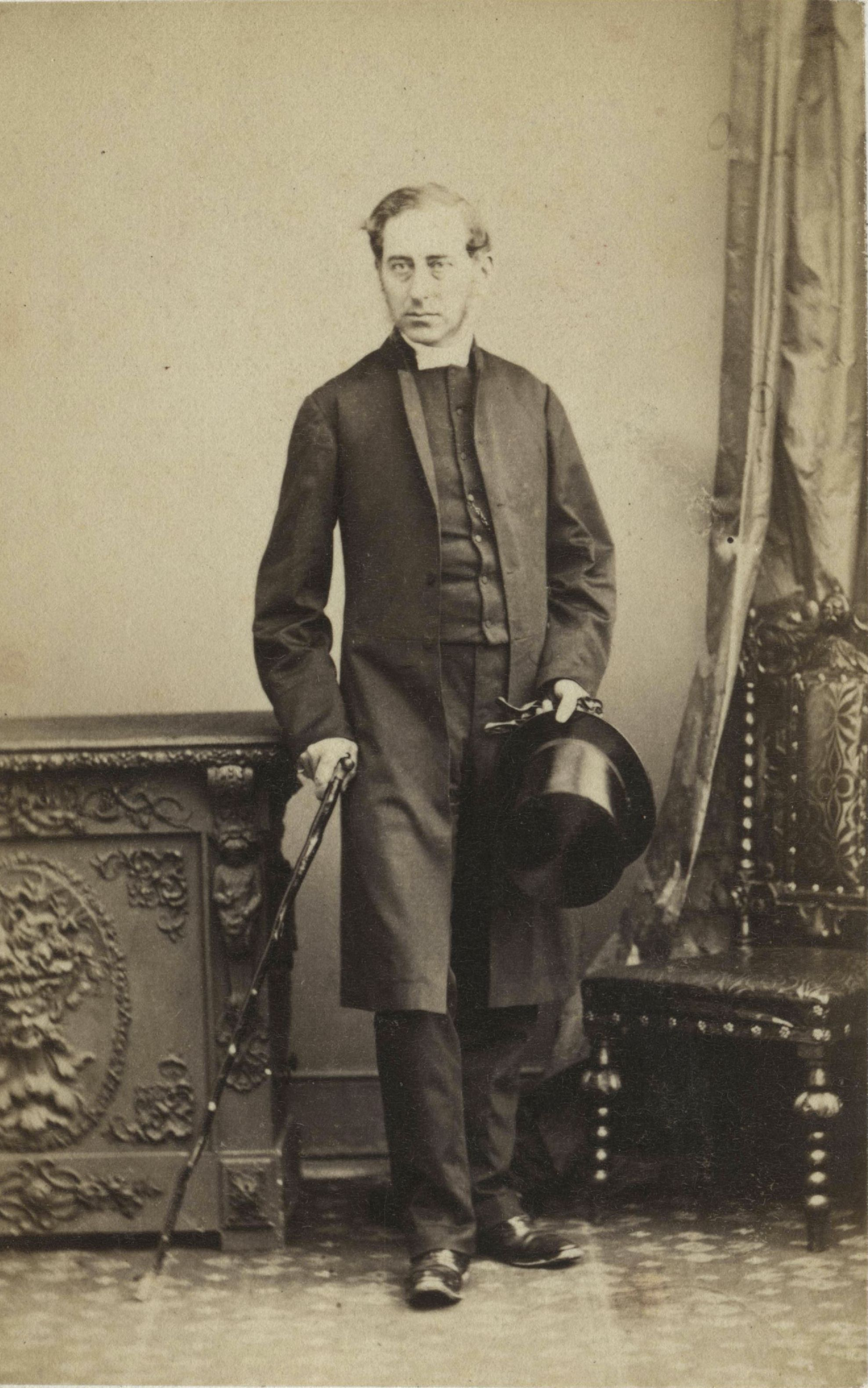
A clergyman posing with Holroyd's "old oak", in use as studio props

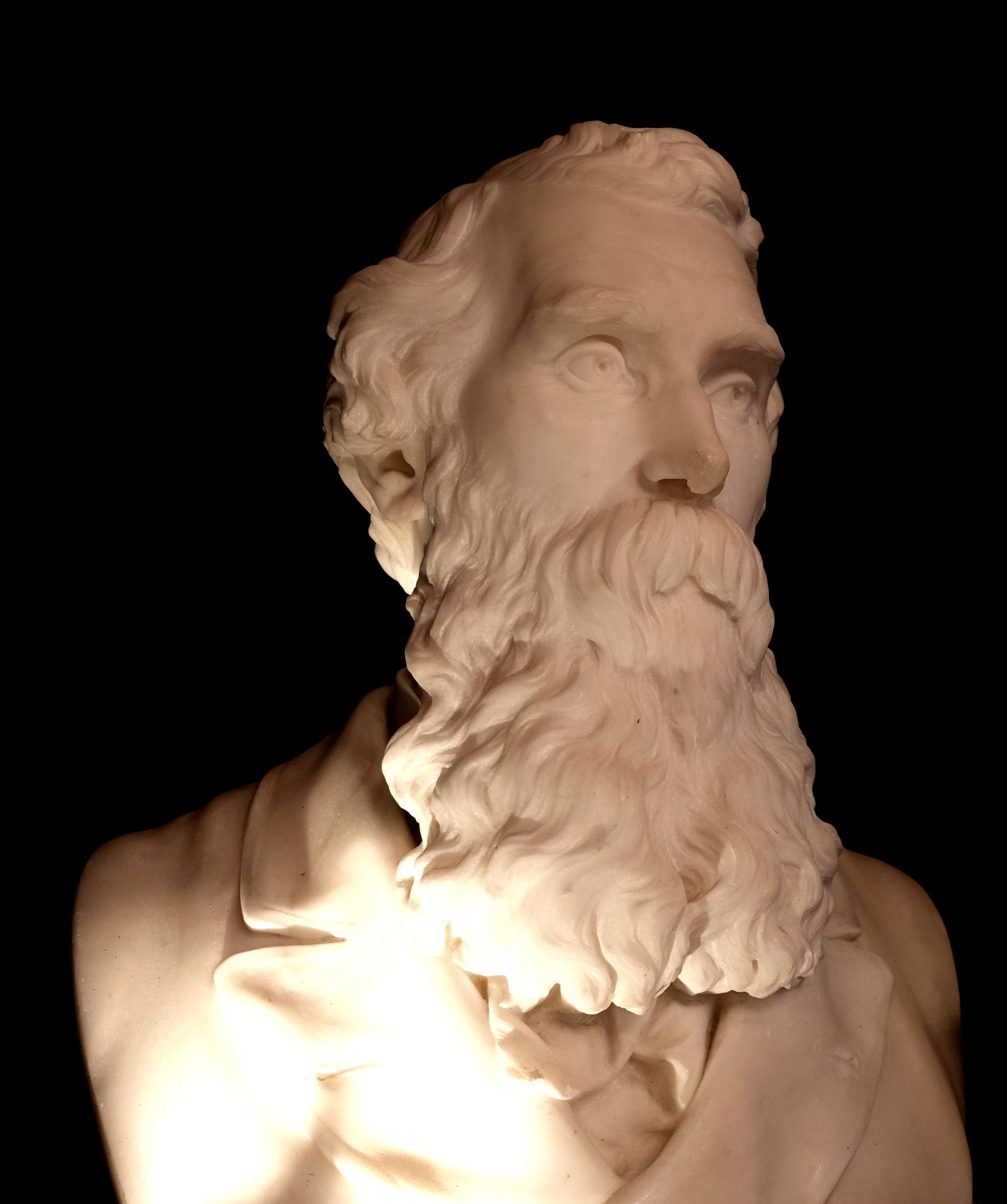
Thomas Holroyd by JSW Webber, 1875/1876

Four of the "old oak" pieces were described by the Pateley Bridge & Nidderdale Herald thus:

The best piece is an Italian chest of the sarcophagus pattern, beautiful in curved outline. The lid rises towards the centre, and bears large relief figures exquisitely carved. The panels also have figures of exceeding boldness ... The late owner had some difficulty after purchasing it in sending it out of the country in which it was so highly regarded. Disguised in the packing the chest ultimately got through to Harrogate ... Two other pieces are elaborate cabinets carved also in relief, but less bold in design. There is a handsome bookcase in English oak once owned by a prominent member of the Tennant family, a former MP for Leeds.

The full list of items left to the Harrogate Corporation by Holroyd is as follows: Five statues by W. J. S. Webber, namely Warrior and the Wounded Youth, Mr Thomas Holroyd, Mr James Holroyd, Mr Bertie Holroyd, John Charles Dollman, an "oak chest; 2 oak bookcases; oak music stand; 2 oak cabinets; 6 oriental vases; over 100 oil paintings and watercolours; one antique chair". These were the terms of the will: "I give and bequeath all the pictures, statuary in marble, and Old Italian Potter ware, (Note: "Old Italian Potter ware" is possibly a reference to Maiolica.) and carved furniture, of which I shall be possessed at the time of my decease, to the Corporation of Harrogate, provided they will accept of the same to form the nucleus of an Art Gallery and Museum, and if they do not accept the same, my Trustees shall make the same offer to the Technical School for the same purpose". In the event, Harrogate did not open its first art gallery until 1930. That was housed in a single-room first-floor extension of Harrogate Library, which had already acquired eight marble busts by Webber, and Holroyd's portrait of William Grainge, in 1916. It was not until 1985 that work began in the former Harrogate Promenade Rooms to create dedicated art gallery space. That site is now the Mercer Art Gallery.

== Studios and works ==
=== London studios ===
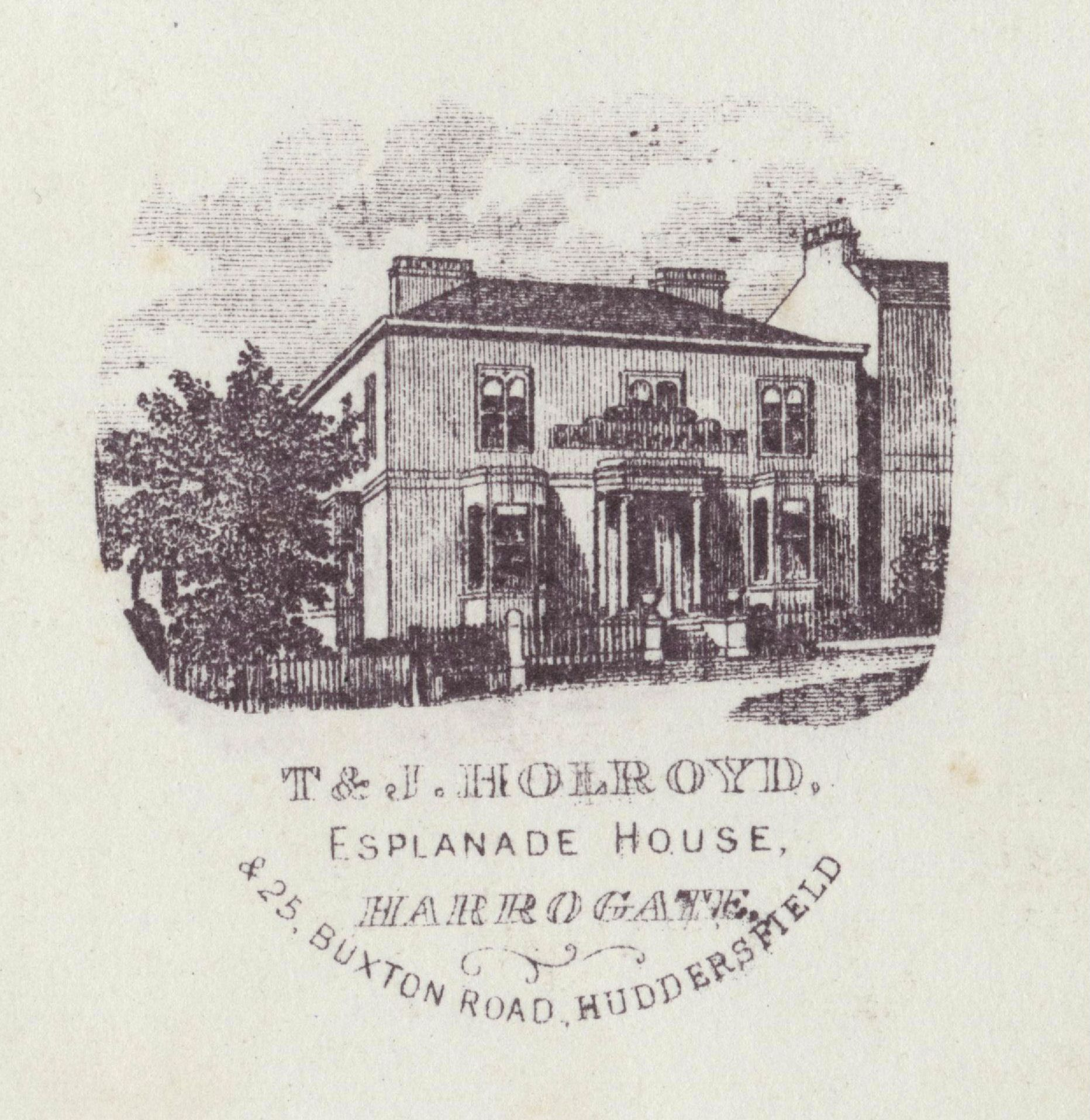
T & J Holroyd's former studio, before 1872

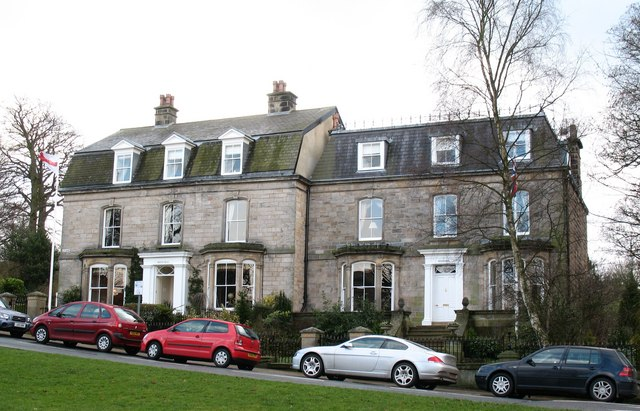
Beech Villa (left) in 2008

In the 1860s and 1870s Holroyd rented studios at Rathbone Place, Oxford Street, London, Fitzroy Street, Fitzroy Square, London, and Howland Street, Fitzroy Square, London.

=== Esplanade House ===
The Harrogate studio, Esplanade House, features as a vignette on the back of the photographic studio's early cabinet cards. The building had the legend, "Holroyd Gallery of Art" on the facade, and functioned as both a photographic and art studio. The photographic studio T & J Holroyd, run by James Holroyd until 1874, had a "national reputation". T & J Holroyd won a prize medal at the Belgian Photographic Exhibition of 1863, and another prize medal at the York Exhibition of 1866. In 1884, Thomas Holroyd was still describing himself as a photographic artist, although his brother James had died in 1874. The studio continued to function under Thomas Holroyd's control, employing four artists in 1874 producing photographic portraits, painted miniatures and oil paintings.

By 1913, it was a hotel which entertained E. M. Forster when he was writing his novel, Maurice. Today it is named Beech Villa and is worth over £1 million.

=== Selected works ===
- Portrait of Dr Kennion (displayed in Harrogate Council Chamber, 1904).

== Exhibitions ==
The titles of some of Holroyd's exhibition pieces illustrate some of his travels in the 1860s and 1870s.

- Royal Academy of Arts: Portrait of Miss le Blanc, 1860; Fountain at Genazzano near Rome, 1860; The Ilex Grove, Genazzano, near Rome (1861); Forenoon, Capri (1862); The Mussel Boat (1875); Grange Bridge, Cumberland (1875); Venetian Fruit Boat (1877); Cleopatra's Needle, Alexandria, Egypt (1878). (Note: The pair of Cleopatra's Needles were removed to the UK and the US in 1877, so the preparatory sketches for the Alexandria painting, if not the painting itself, would have been made before 1877)

== Collections ==
- Leeds Art Gallery: Staithes, Whitby, North Yorkshire, 1878; River scene, undated;
- Mercer Art Gallery, Harrogate: William Grainge, 1870; Alderman Richard Ellis JP, mayor 1884–1887, 1887; Alderman Simpson, before 1895; John Herbert Wilson, mayor of Harrogate, 1897; Alderman Joseph Hammond, before 1901. Also four watercolour landscapes: View of Knaresborough (1880s), The Dyeworks, World's End, Knaresborough, and one untitled landscape.
- Harrogate Central Library, Harrogate: William Grainge, 1870.
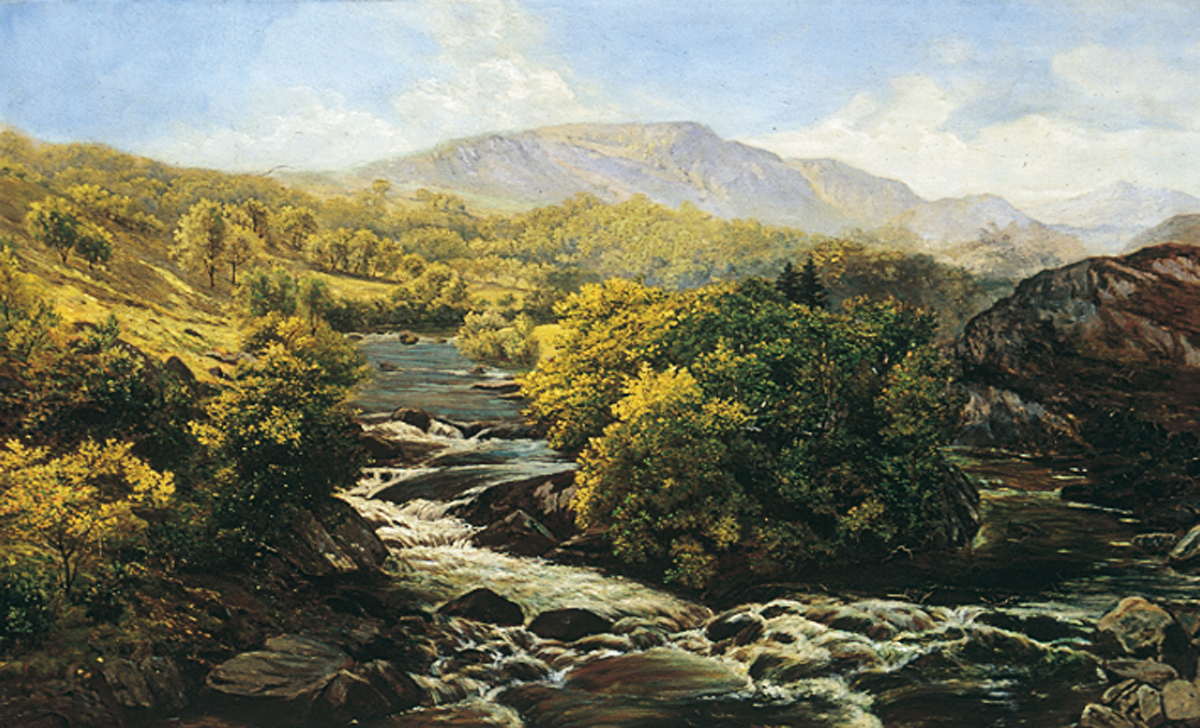
River scene, undated

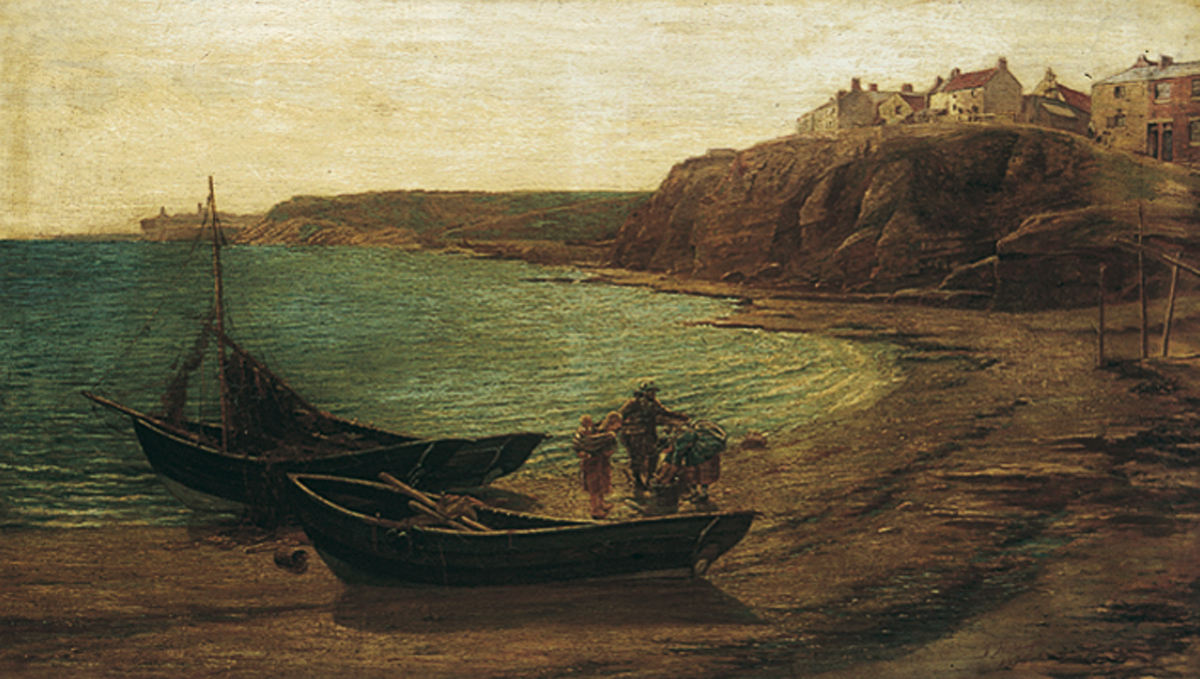
Staithes, Whitby, North Yorkshire, 1878

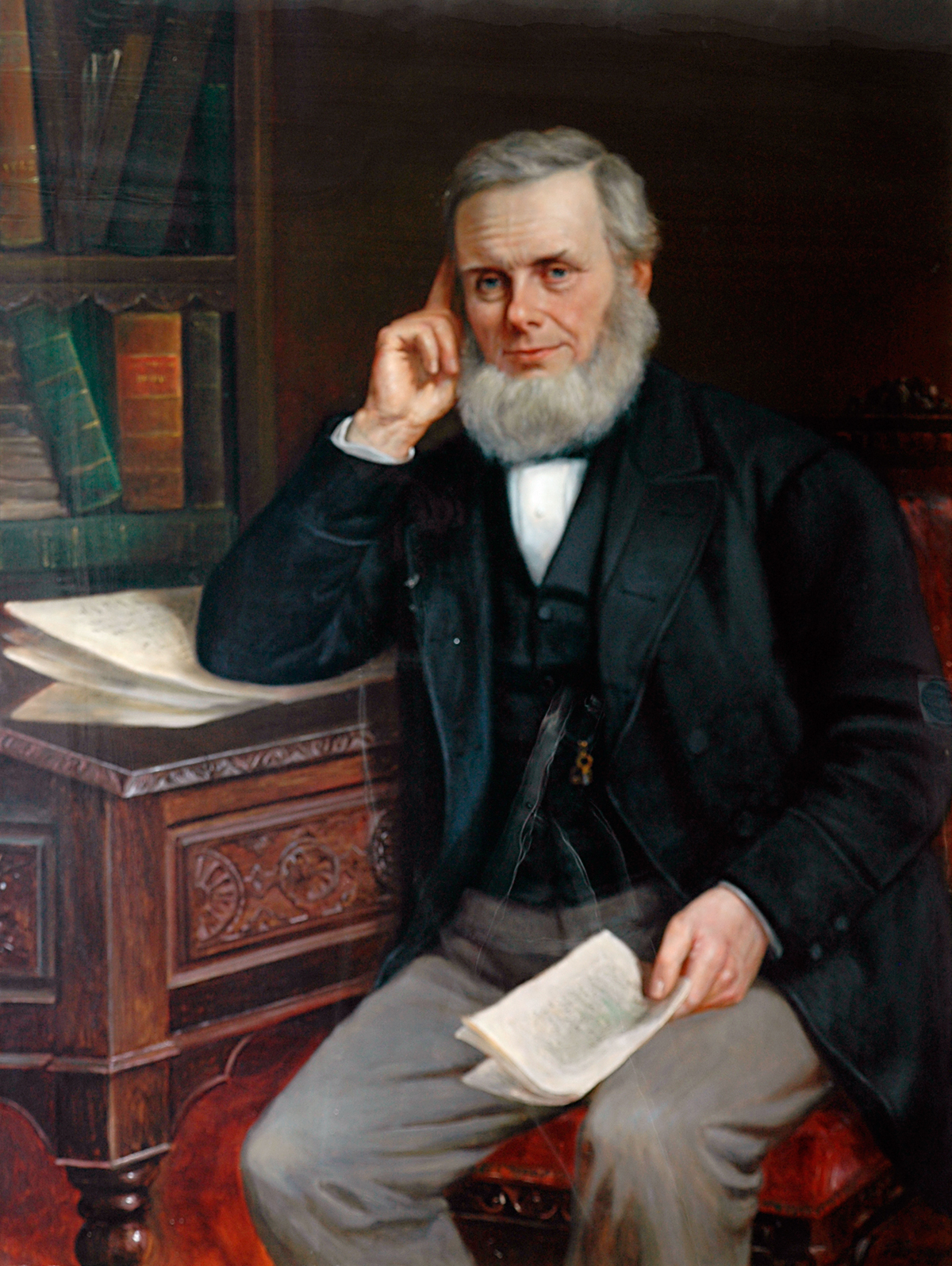
Historian William Grainge, 1870

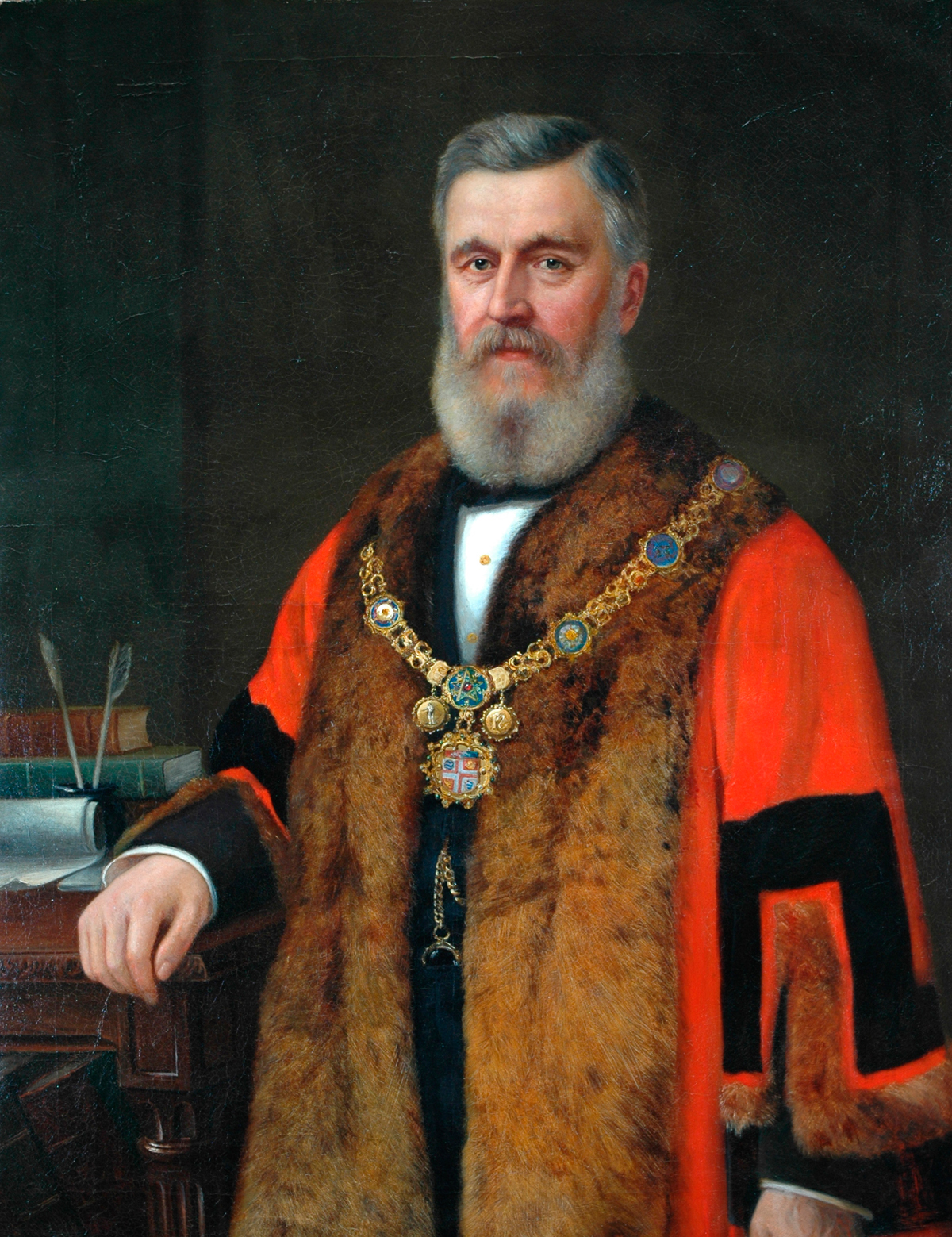
Mayor Richard Ellis, c.1887

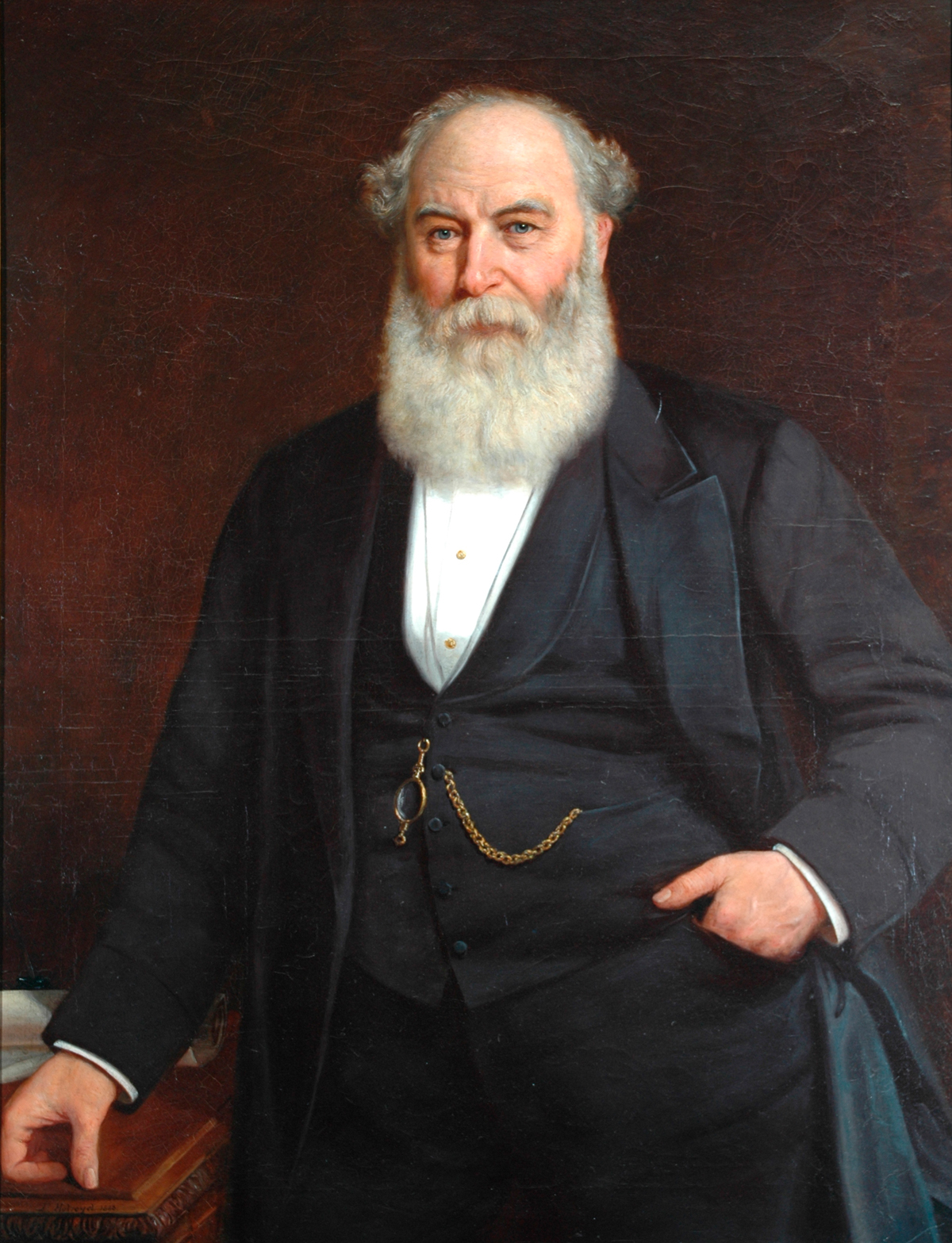
Alderman Joseph Hammond, 1883

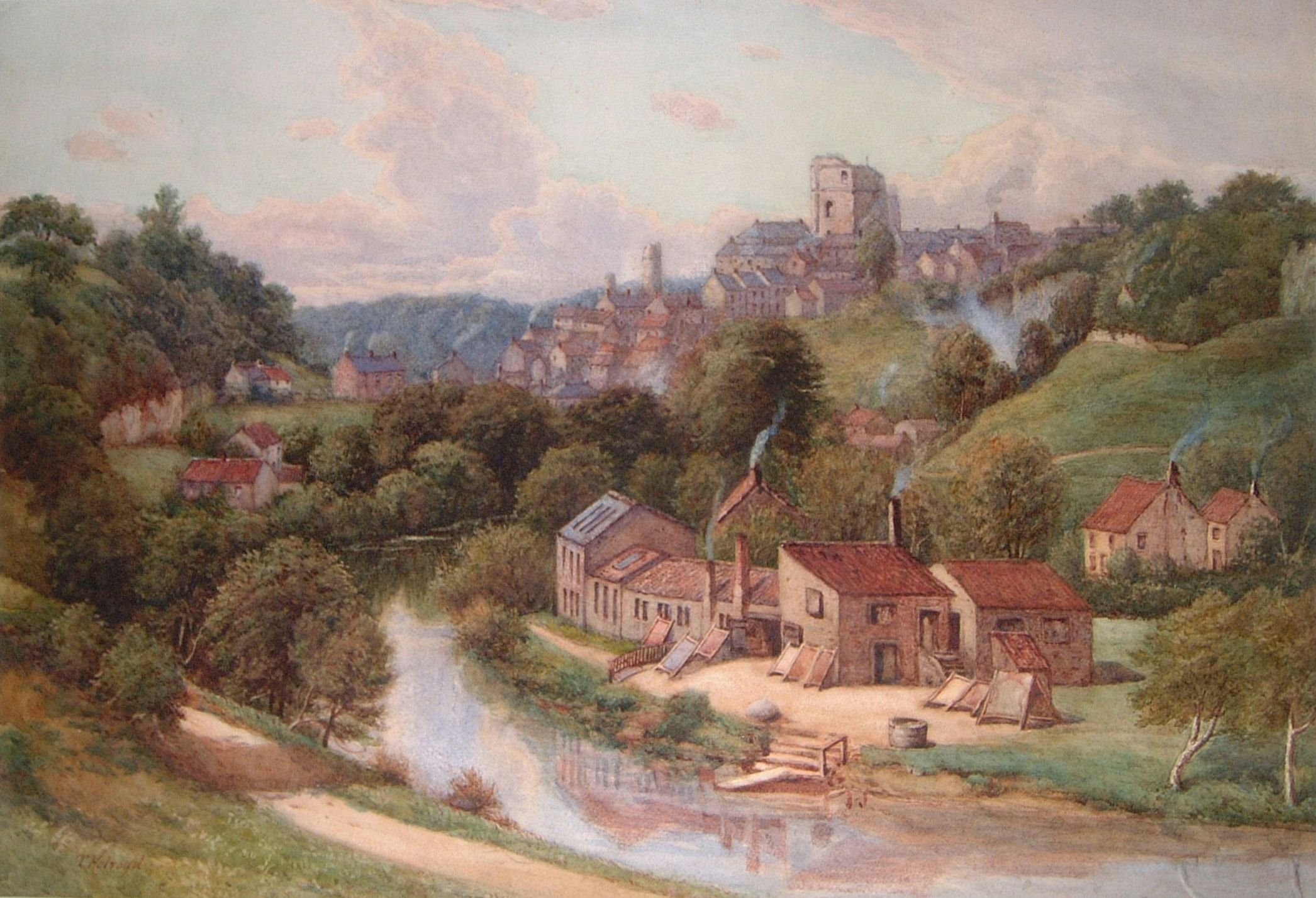
The Dyeworks, Knaresborough, North Yorkshire, undated
