= William John Seward Webber =

British sculptor (1842–1919)

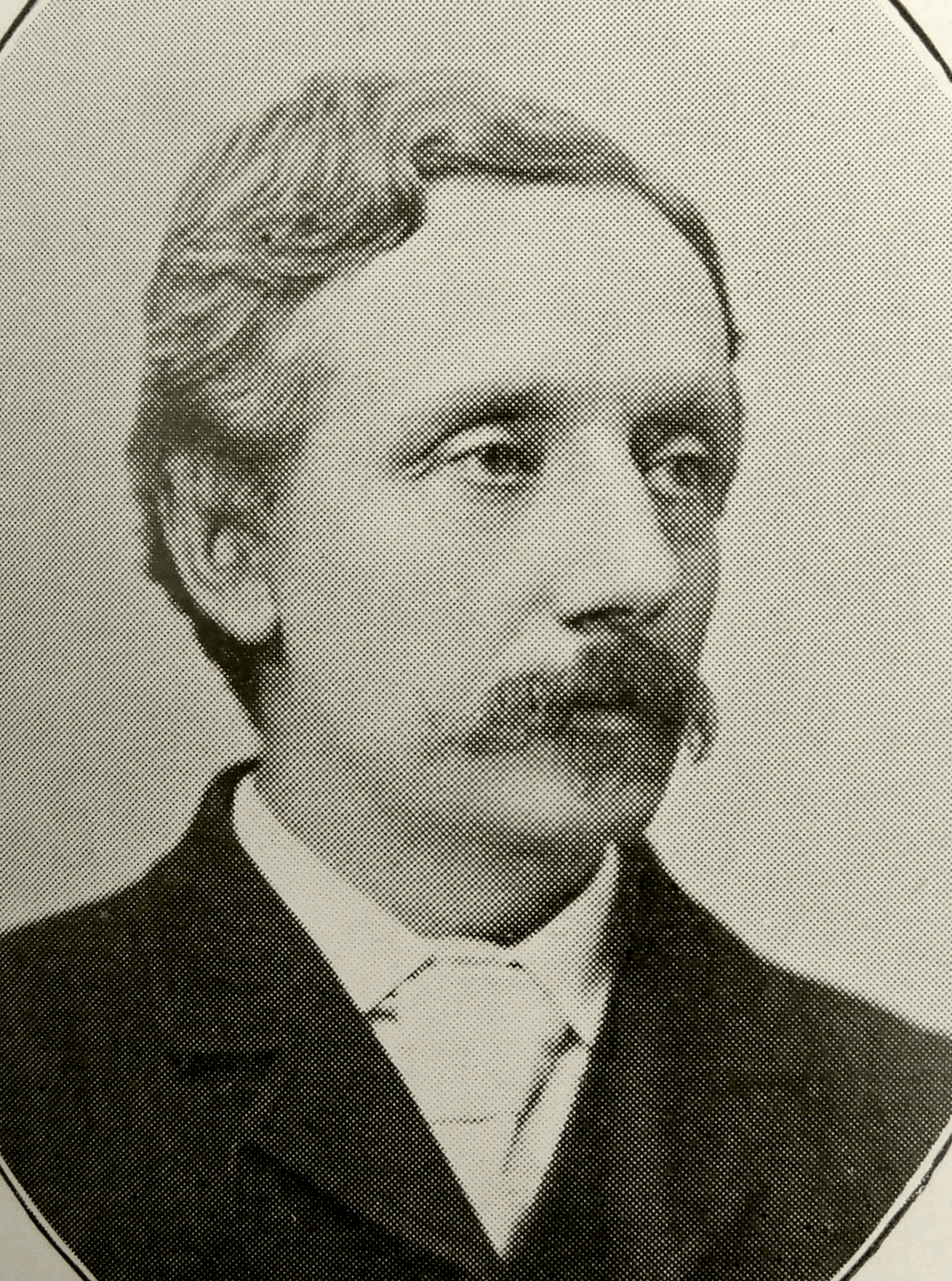
- W.J.S Webber, 1880s
- Born: January 1842; Exeter, Devon, England
- Died: 17 March 1919 (aged 77); Harrogate, North Riding of Yorkshire, England
- Resting place: Grove Road Cemetery, Harrogate
- Known for: Civic sculpture and busts of local worthies, in marble
- Notable work: Warrior and Wounded Youth (group, 1878); Queen Victoria (monument, 1887)

William John Seward Webber (January 1842 – c. 17 March 1919) was an English sculptor who created civic statuary, and busts of national heroes and local worthies, in marble. He sculpted the statue of Queen Victoria for the Jubilee Monument in Harrogate, North Riding of Yorkshire, England in 1887. An early success was his Warrior and Wounded Youth group of 1878, executed while he was still a student. His busts include portraits of the Duke of Clarence, John Charles Dollman, Henry Phillpotts, John Bowring, John Ruskin, Richard Jefferies, Alfred, Lord Tennyson, Charles Darwin, Walter Scott, Thomas Carlyle, Robert Burns and Thomas Holroyd.

He was the son of a carver and emigration depot master. He was born and grew up in South West England, and he trained with John Gendall, and at the Exeter School of Art and West London School of Art, before attending the Royal Academy Schools. He worked from studios in London for a while, then at the age of around 49 years he moved to Harrogate, where he worked for the rest of his life. He is buried in an unmarked grave in Grove Road Cemetery, Harrogate.

== Life ==
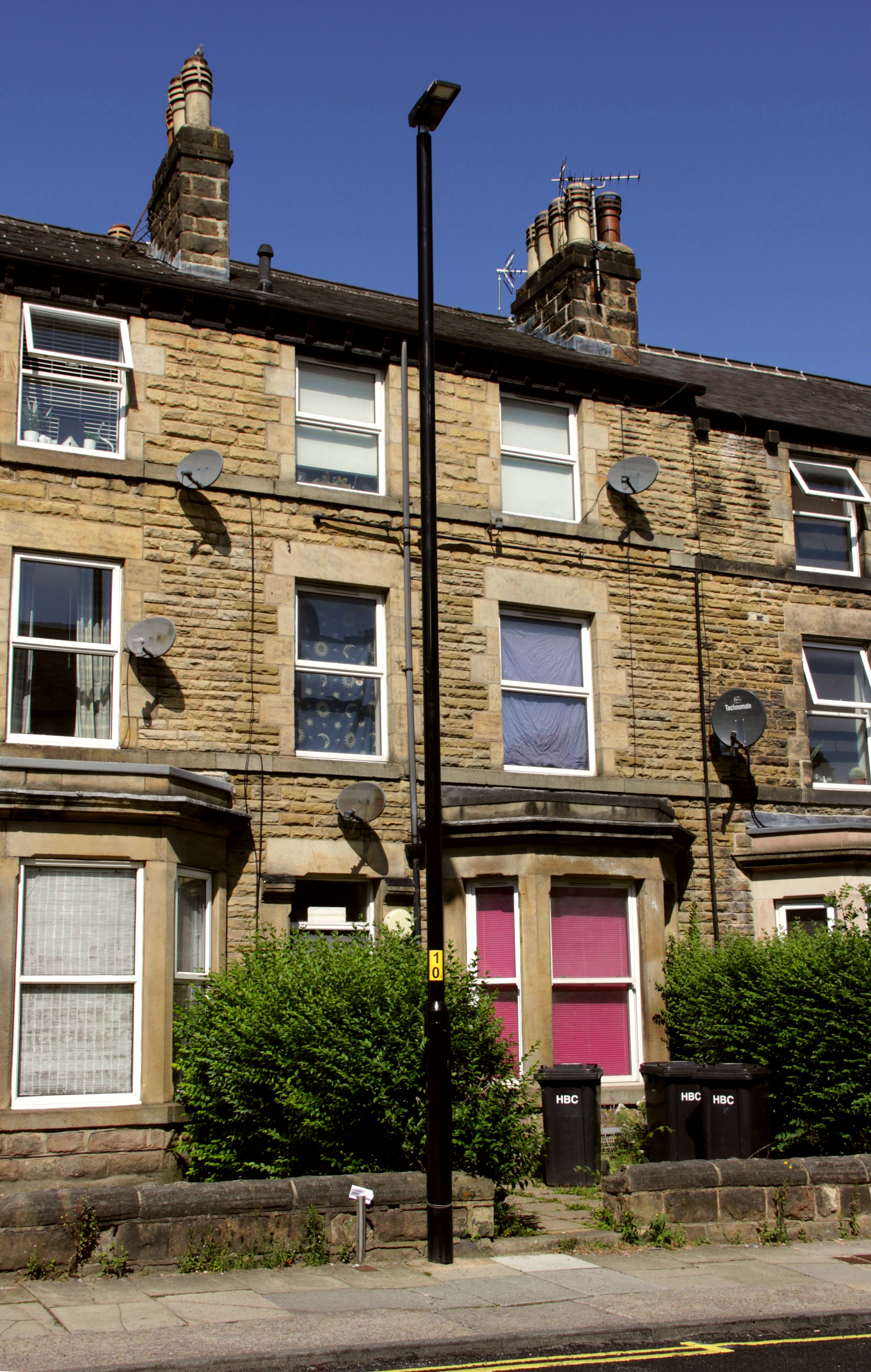
Webber's former Harrogate home, Holliscroft

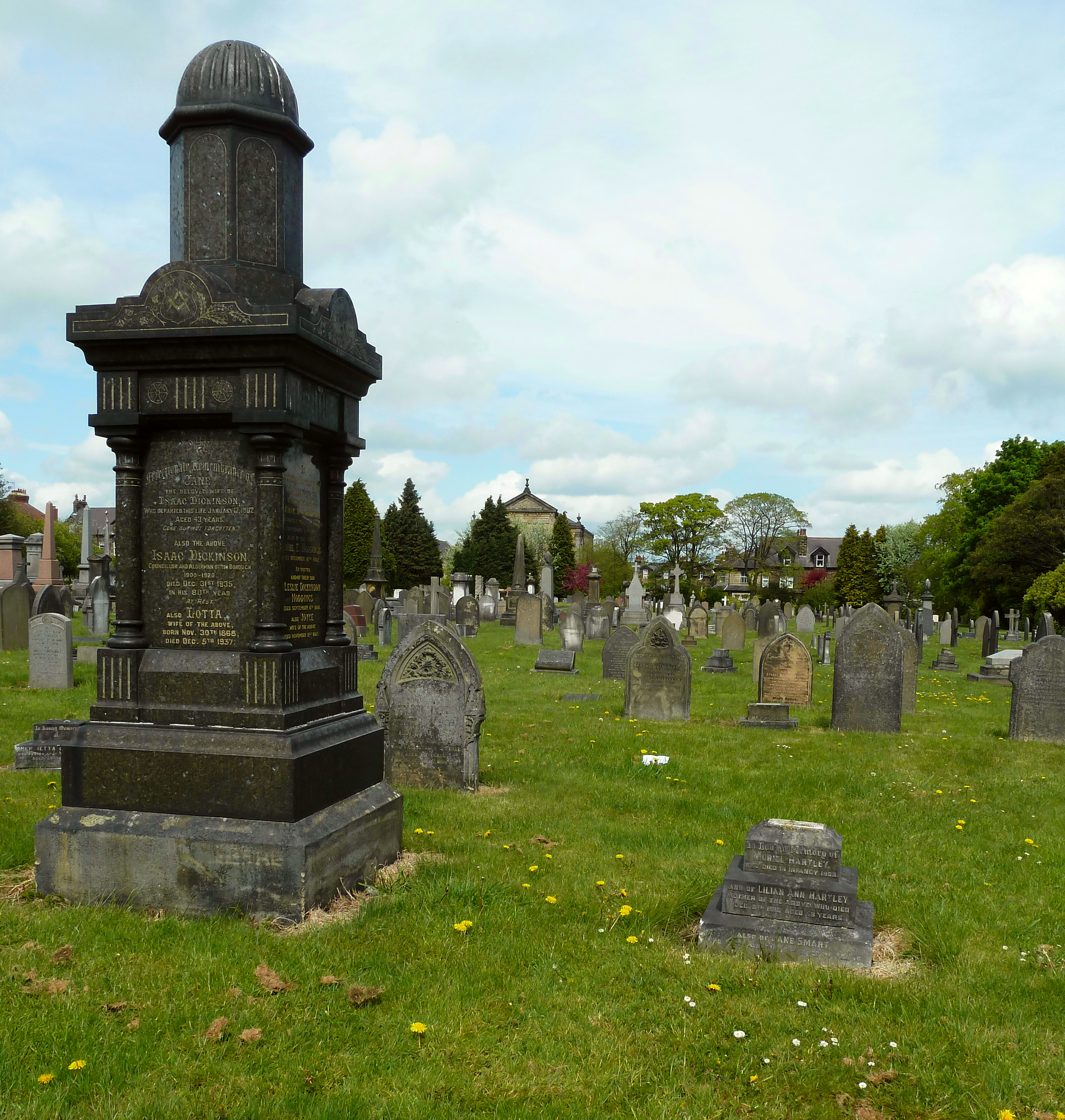
Webber's unmarked grave is in this area of Grove Road Cemetery

William John Seward (West Teignmouth 1790 – 1857), a superintendent of a home for Irish emigrants in Exeter, Devon, was Webber's maternal grandfather. His maternal grandmother was Ann Seward née Rendell (Devon 25 November 1790 – 1830). His step-maternal grandmother was the matron of the emigrant home, Mary Seward (b. Tiverton ca.1803). Webber's father was William R. Webber (Teignmouth 1806 – Tavistock 1874), a carver who in 1861 was also an emigration depot master in East Stonehouse, Devon. His mother was Hadassah Seward (Teignmouth 13 March 1822 – Knaresborough 1905), a matron of the emigration depot. (Note: Hadassah was the birth name of Queen Esther, from the Book of Esther.)

William John Seward Webber was born in Exeter in January 1842. His brother was Charles Benjamin Warwick Webber (Plymouth ca.1854 – Plymouth 1881). His sister was dressmaker Edith Alice Maria Webber (Stonehouse 1863 – Barnet 1949). In 1851 William J.S. Webber was a scholar living at the Emigrants' Home in St Andrew, Exeter, with his maternal grandparents. By 1861 he was a carver living with his parents at the Emigrants' Depot, Newport Street, Exeter. Between 1870 and 1871 he lodged at 205 Tottenham Court Road, London, as a student, describing himself as a sculptor's assistant and student of sculpture at the Royal Academy.

Webber attended school at Plymouth. He was apprenticed as a carver, and after that he trained for two years at the studio of John Gendall (1790–1864), at the same time attending Exeter School of Art. He moved to London in 1864 to study at the West London School of Art, where he qualified to attend the Royal Academy. He then studied at the Royal Academy School, gaining First Medals in 1871 and 1873, and a scholarship. He graduated in 1875.

Between 1874 and 1891 Webber's address was 39 Goodge Street, London, and in 1891 he moved to Holliscroft, Dale Street, Harrogate. Between 1901 and 1911 (and possibly until his death) he lived in a modest terraced house: Holliscroft, 3 Mayfield Grove. Harrogate. In 1891 his mother and sister Edith were living with him; by 1911, just his sister. He never married. Webber died around 17 March 1919 in Harrogate. He is buried in Grove Road Cemetery, Harrogate, but has no grave stone. (Note: Webber is buried in Grove Road Cemetery, Harrogate, in section G, plot 1372. His unmarked grave is near the tall Dickinson memorial. He is buried on the non-Anglican side of the cemetery, with the Roman Catholics, non-conformists etc.)

=== Character ===
According to the Harrogate Advertiser:

Webber was a shy unpushful man, careless about money which inhibited his professional advancement. He was interested in natural history and attended Natural History Society meetings in the Harrogate area. He was religious (Webber's family were non-conformists but he was tolerant of all faiths), and well read, particularly in philosophy. (Note: The meetings attended by Webber were probably those of the Yorkshire Naturalists' Union, the main local naturalists' group.)

== Career ==
According to the Census in England, Webber described himself as a "carver" in 1861, a "sculptor's assistant & student of sculpture, Royal Academy" in 1871, a "sculptor" in 1891, and a "sculptor (marble stone etc.) working on own account" in 1901. He gave his occupation as "sculpture, portraiture in marble or bronze, working on own account at home" in 1911.

=== Studios ===
In 1870, Webber had a studio at 205 Tottenham Court Road, London. Between 1874 and 1884, he had a studio at 39 Googe Street, London. By 1877 and until 1882 he was maintaining a second studio at 245 Stanhope Street, Hampstead Road, London. From 1888 he shared a studio in Dale Street, Harrogate, with the painter Thomas Holroyd. There he "continued to practise as a sculptor for the remainder of his career".

=== Awards ===
- Two medals and a national medallion, awarded by the Exeter School of Art.
- Gold medal awarded by South Kensington (1850s).
- Medals for "modelling in the antique and life" awarded by Royal Academy Schools (1871, 1873).
- Gold medal and £50 scholarship award for The Warrior and the Wounded Youth (1875) awarded by Royal Academy Schools.

== Works ==
=== Warrior and Wounded Youth, 1875 and 1878 ===
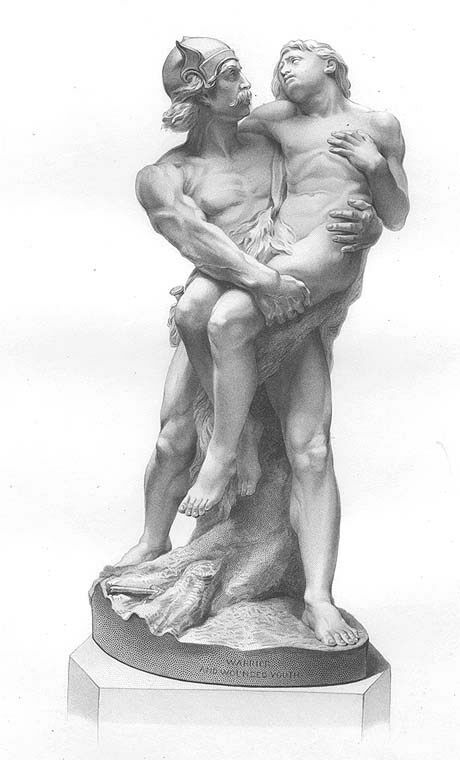
Warrior and Wounded Youth, 1875 and 1878

This marble statuette was modelled in 1875, and copied by Webber in marble for Thomas Holroyd in 1878. It was reviewed by S.C. Hall in the Art Journal, December 1880:

The work was modelled by Mr. Webber whilst he was a student in the Royal Academy, and he was awarded by the council of that body a [prize] for the general excellence of the design. The warrior represented is one of a prehistoric type, when the weapons in use were chiefly flint-headed arrows or bronze swords and spears, and the clothing merely the skin of some wild animal, giving the sculptor an excellent opportunity of displaying, what is always of importance in sculpture, the form and structure of the rude human figure. The figure of the warrior is vigorous in action, the anatomical form being well defined, and the expression of tenderness and anxiety on account of the youth whom he is bearing is well depicted in his face. The striking contrast with this robust and vigorous figure is the shrinking, writhing form of the wounded youth, stricken down in his first campaign. His left hand covers the wound he has received, and he turns with an expression of pain to his comrade, who is bearing him to a place of safety.

=== Jubilee Memorial, Harrogate, 1887 ===
This is a Grade II listed building, designed by Arthur Bown of Harrogate. It was constructed by Richardson of Scarborough, and it contains a statue of Queen Victoria executed by Webber. The memorial was given to Harrogate by Mayor Richard Ellis, and unveiled on 6 October 1887. According to English Heritage, the canopy was also carved by Webber.

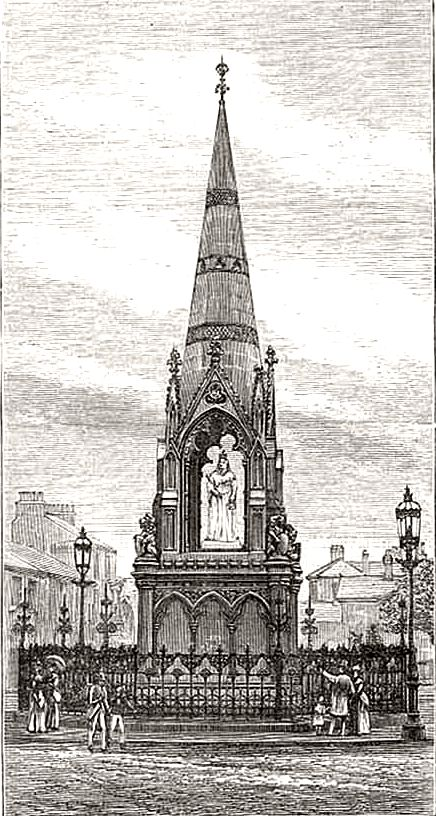
The Jubilee Monument, 1887

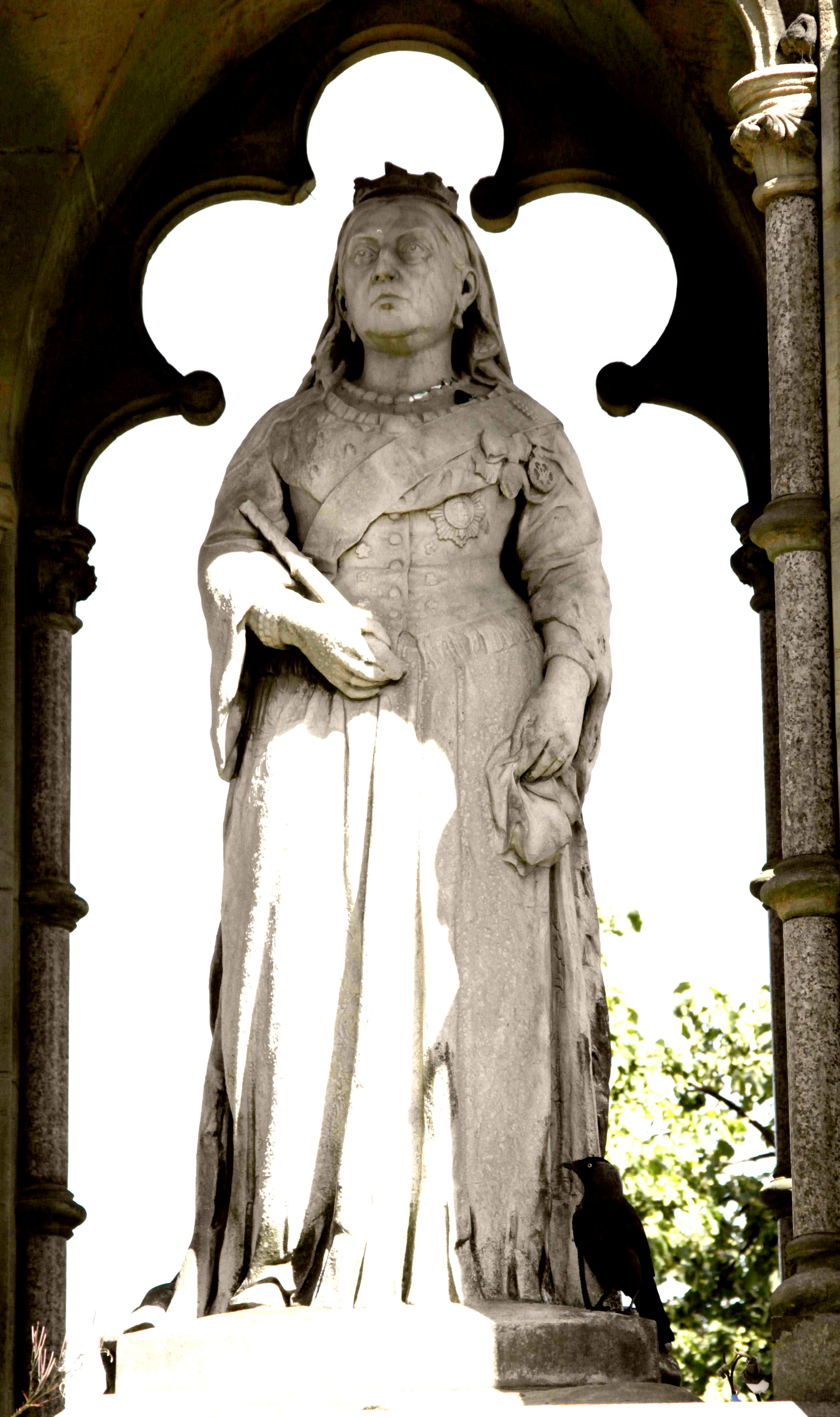
Queen Victoria by Webber, 1887

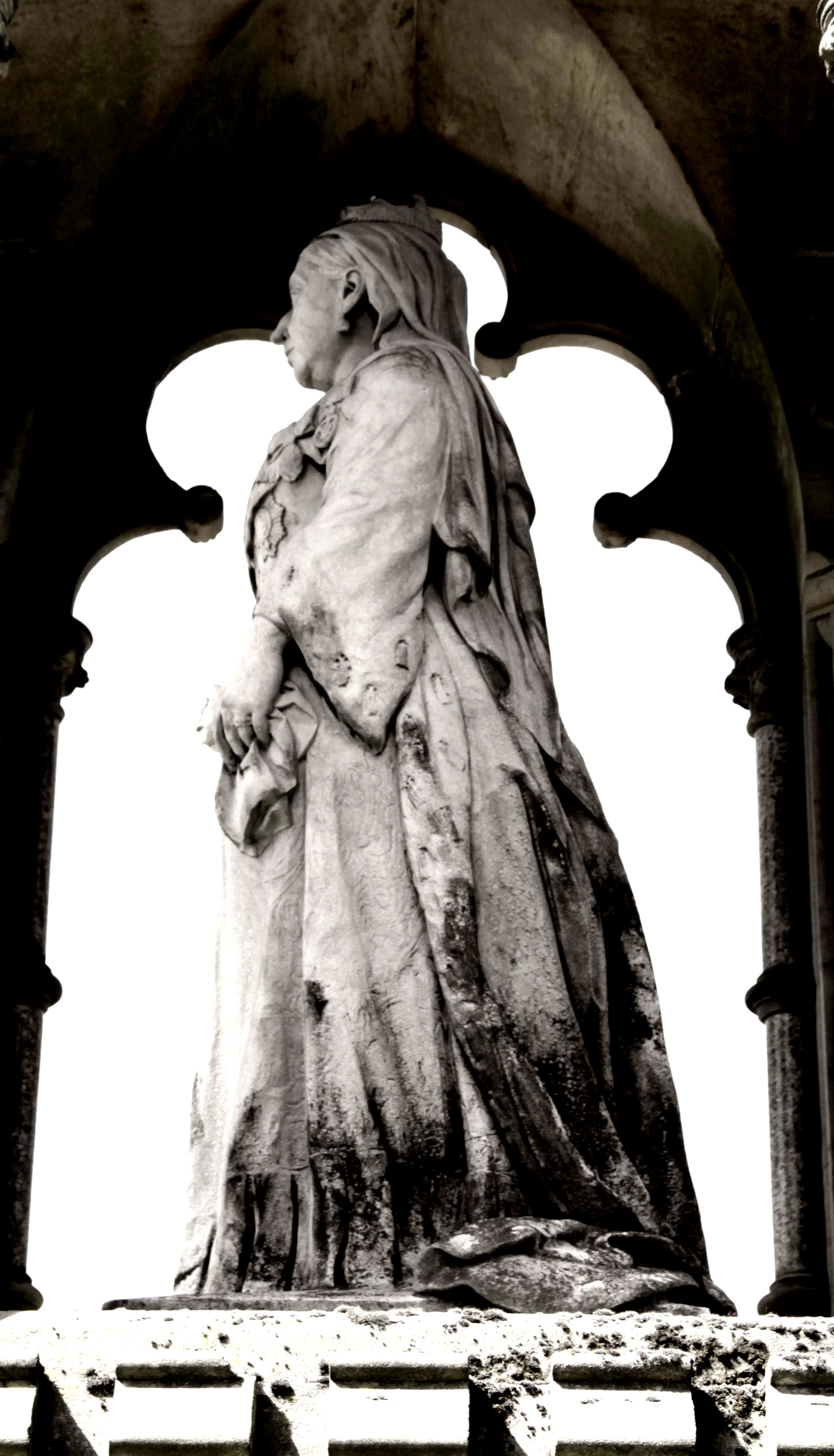
Queen Victoria by Webber, 1887

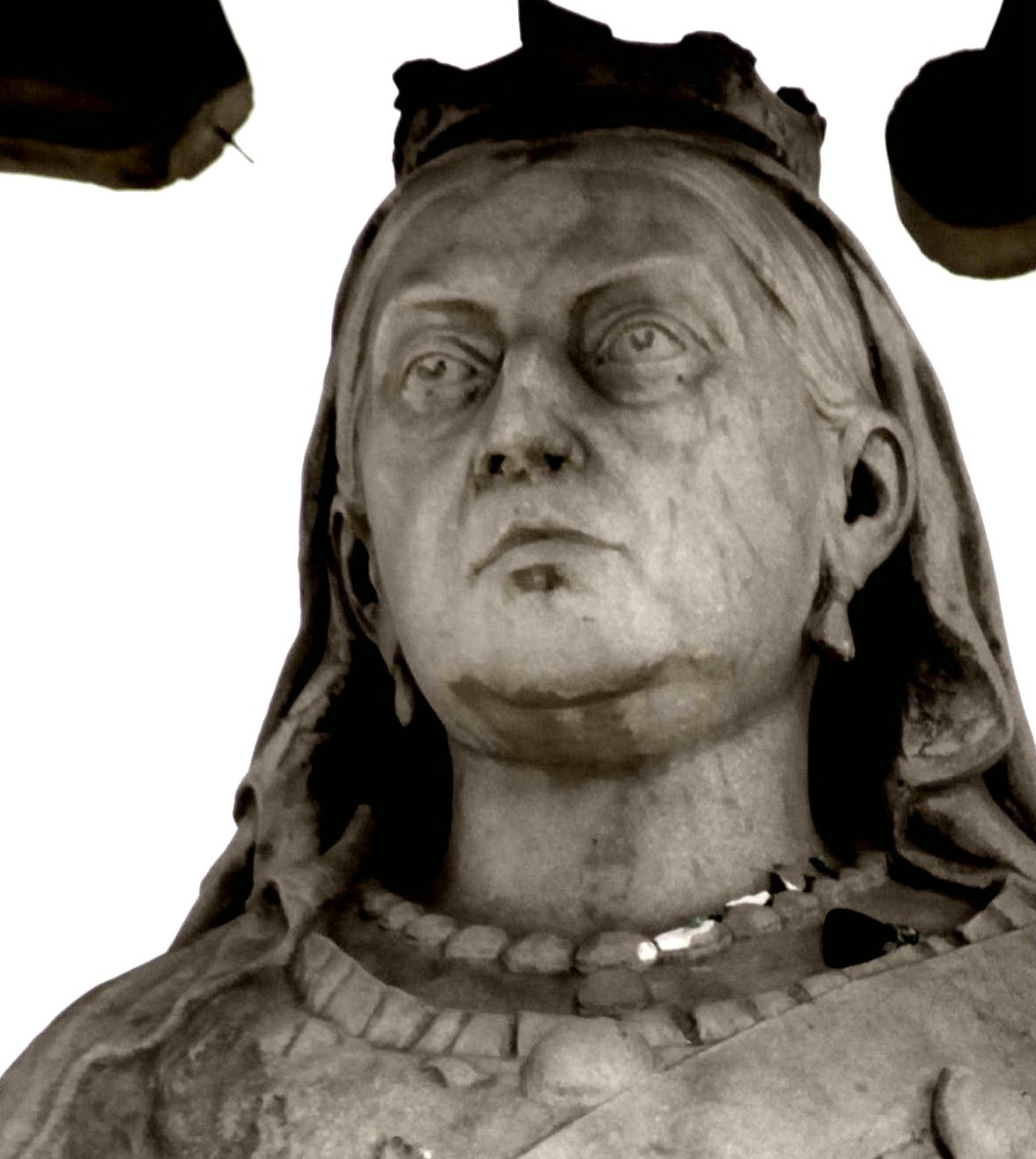
Queen Victoria by Webber, 1887. Showing the Koh-i-Noor cabochon diamond on her necklace.

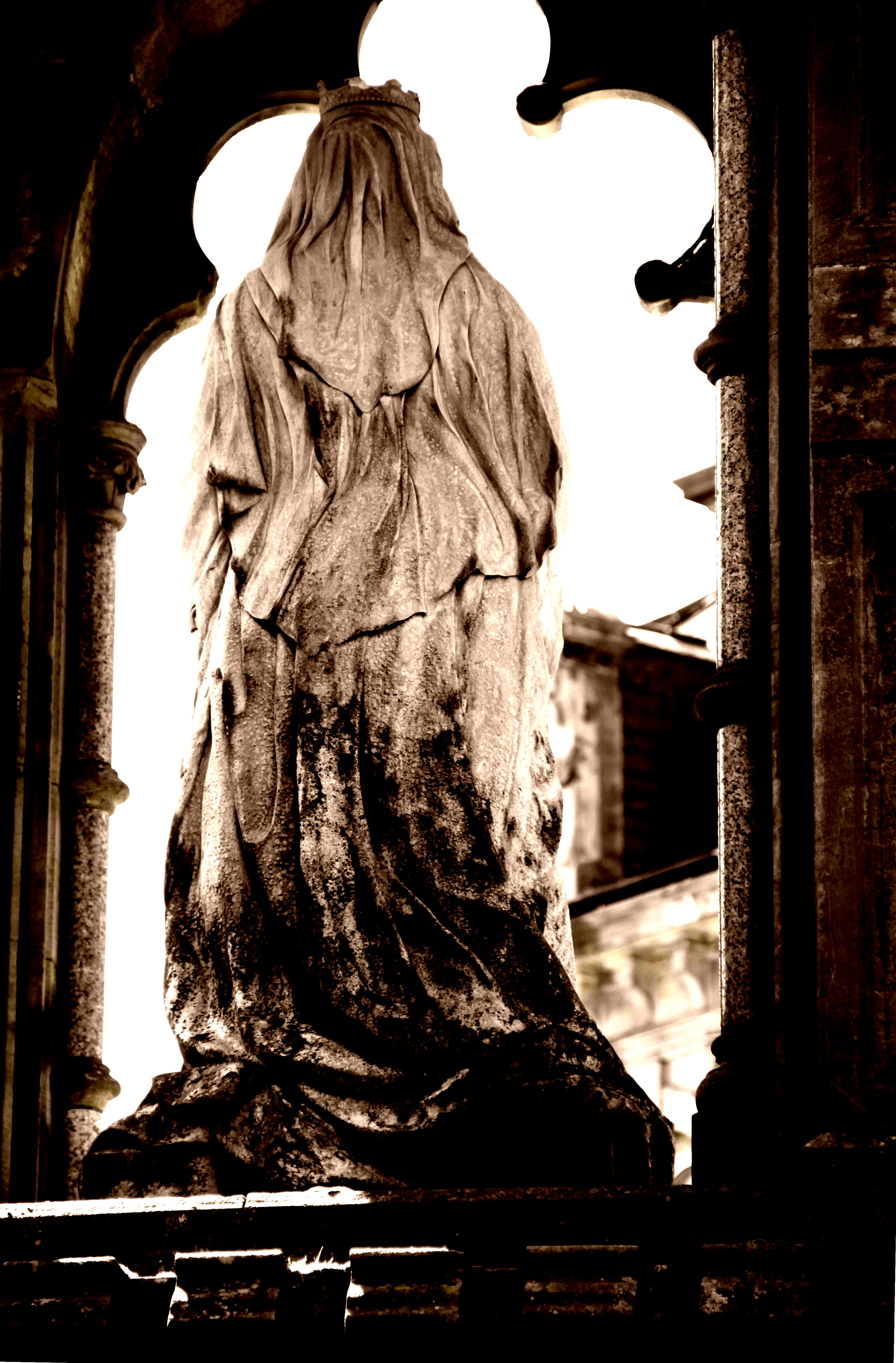
Queen Victoria by Webber, 1887

=== Holyroyd bequest, 1904 ===
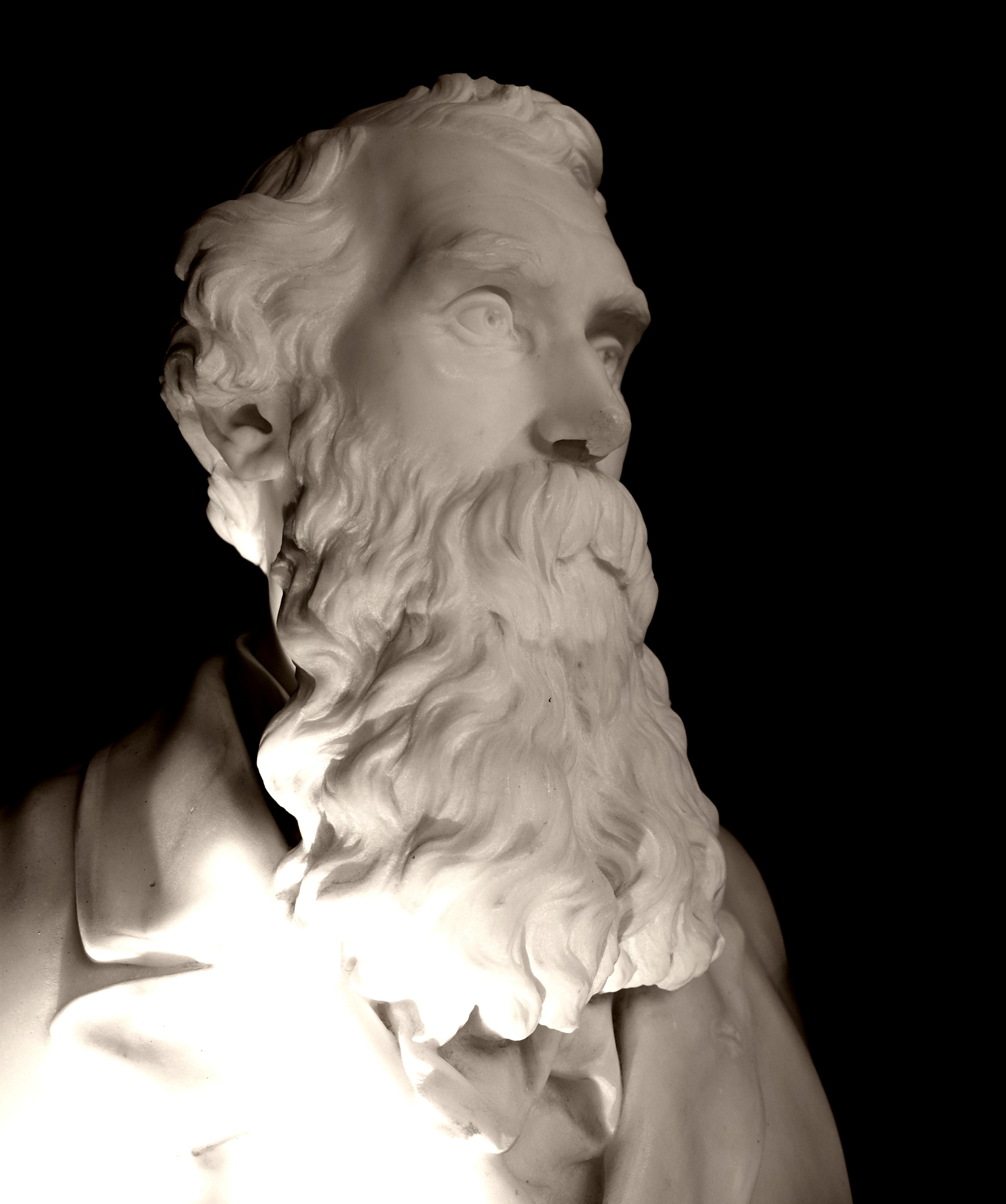
Thomas Holroyd, by Webber, 1875/1876

Five marble sculptures, The Warrior and the Wounded Youth (statuette, 1878), (Note: A depiction of The Warrior and Wounded Youth was engraved and published in the Art Journal in December 1880. The size of the 1878 version was 40 x 20 in. (101.6 x 50.8 cm.)) Mr Thomas Holroyd (bust, 1876), Mr James Holroyd (bust), Mr Bertie Holroyd (bust) and John Charles Dollman (bust, 1875), were commissioned by the painter Thomas Holroyd and executed by Webber. They were left by Holroyd to Harrogate Corporation in 1904, and were formally accepted by the corporation on 21 March 1904. Harrogate Library acquired eight marble busts by Webber in 1916, but some of the Holroyd bequest pieces have not been retained by the Borough of Harrogate. For example, the 1878 Warrior and the Wounded Youth was sold in 1998, in Miami.

=== Exhibitions ===
- Royal Academy Summer Exhibition (1870–1891): Dr Phillpotts, late Bishop of Exeter (1870), Sir John Bowring (1874), John C. Dollman (1875, 1878), Thomas Holroyd, Esq., marble bust (1876), Warrior and wounded Youth (1876, 1878), A Nereid (1876), Maidenhood, statuette (1877), T.F. Dollman Esq. (1879), Miss Emma Glase (1879), W.R. Seward, Esq., bust (1882), (Note: Seward was Webber's maternal family name, so W.R. Seward was likely a relative.) Elsie, daughter of J.N. Fitch, Esq. (1884), (Note: J.N. Fitch is possibly John Nugent Fitch, an artist and contemporary of Webber.) and The Late Alderman Dawson (1891).

=== Collections ===
- Royal College of Music: Albert Victor, Duke of Clarence (bust, 1890). It is on "semi-public display".
- Mercer Art Gallery, Harrogate: Eight busts were originally displayed from 1906 in Harrogate Library: William Shakespeare (bust, 1902); John Ruskin (bust, 1903); Richard Jefferies (bust, 1904); Alfred, Lord Tennyson (bust, 1901); Charles Darwin (bust, 1904); Walter Scott (bust, 1903); Thomas Carlyle (bust, 1902); Robert Burns (bust, 1901). The following items in the Mercer collection are portraits of civic personages: Alderman Richard Ellis (bust, 1888); Mary Jane Ellis (bust, 1888);, and Barry Alderman George Dawson (bust, 1889);

=== Works in date order ===
- Dr Phillpotts, late Bishop of Exeter (1870),
- Sir John Bowring (1874),
- John C. Dollman (1875),
- Thomas Holroyd, Esq., (bust, 1876).
- Warrior and wounded Youth (first version, 1876). (Note: In the Warrior and Wounded Youth statuette, the warrior is Hercules wearing his attribute, the lionskin cloak, on his back. See photograph on 1st Dibs)
- A Nereid (1876),
- Maidenhood, (statuette, 1877).
- T.F. Dollman Esq. (1879).
- Miss Emma Glase (1879).
- W.R. Seward, Esq., (bust, 1882),
- Elsie, daughter of J.N. Fitch, Esq. (1884),
- Queen Victoria (statue for the Jubilee Memorial, Harrogate, 1887).
- Mr and Mrs Ellis (busts, 1888). As of 1902 they were "standing in the Royal Baths", Harrogate, having been presented by "the burgesses of Harrogate by public subscription".
- Alderman George Dawson and his wife (busts, 1889) for the Royal Baths, Harrogate.
- H.R.H. the Duke of Clarence (bust, 1890), for the Royal College of Music, London. Samson Fox commissioned it. It was presented in 1894 to the Prince of Wales (later Edward VII), who in turn gave it to the Royal College of Music.
- Rev. John Kinghan (memorial bust, 1896), "the principal of the Ulster Institution for the Deaf and Dumb" for the Institution in Belfast".
- Robert Burns (bust, 1901).
- Lord Tennyson (bust, 1901).
- William Shakespeare (bust, 1902);
- Thomas Carlyle (bust, 1902).
- John Ruskin (bust, 1903).
- Walter Scott (bust, 1903).
- Richard Jefferies (bust, 1904);
- Charles Darwin (bust, 1904);

=== Undated works ===
- The Earl of Beaconsfield (statuette, undated).
- The Right Hon. W.E. Forster, M.P. (statuette, undated).
- The Right Hon. W.L. Jackson, M.P. (statuette, undated).
- General Sir Redvers Buller (statuette, undated).
- Samson Fox of Grove House, Harrogate (undated).
- Mrs Harrison Gibson (bust, undated), for the Royal Bath Hospital, Harrogate.
- His First Invention (statuette, undated) "of a young engineer studying a mechanical model".
- Mr James Holroyd (bust, undated).
- Mr Bertie Holroyd (bust, undated).
