= Richard Ellis (mayor) =

English property developer (1820–1895)

Richard Ellis JP
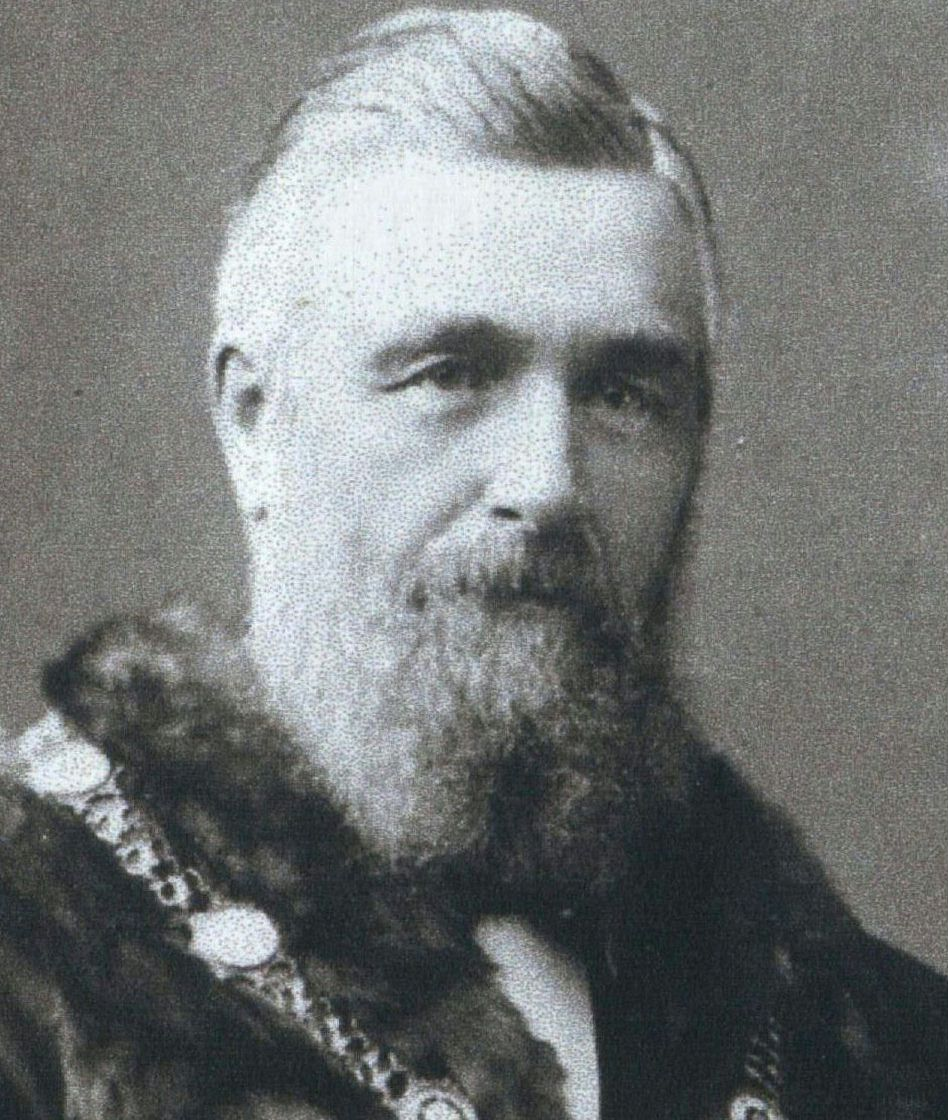
- Ellis in 1884
- Born: November 1820; Harrogate, West Riding of Yorkshire, England
- Died: 21 August 1895 (aged 74); Harrogate, West Riding of Yorkshire, England
- Burial place: Grove Road Cemetery, Harrogate
- Monuments: Large red marble obelisk at his grave
- Occupations: Builder and developer; alderman; mayor of Harrogate; public benefactor
- Known for: Joining High and Low Harrogate by development to make a single spa town

Richard Ellis JP (November 1820 – 21 August 1895) was an English builder, property developer, alderman, mayor, and a public benefactor to his town. The son of a blacksmith, he was a self-made man who started as a joiner and became a rich developer who joined High and Low Harrogate into a single town, helped obtain a Charter of Corporation, and promoted the erection of civic buildings appropriate for a spa town. Thus he became known as the Bismarck of Harrogate, his achievement in joining two villages to create a single town having been wittily compared in the 19th century with Bismarck's unification of Germany.

Ellis was a benefactor to Ashville College and Harrogate Royal Infirmary, and paid for the town's Jubilee Memorial and the land on which it stands. While the present centre of Harrogate was yet under construction, he negotiated with the Duchy of Lancaster to exchange land so that the existing railway line could be diverted to High Harrogate, and Harrogate railway station built. Historian Malcolm Neesam said, "Ellis' devotion to Harrogate must be classed as outstanding".

== Background ==
Ellis' was a self-made man, and his modest, artisanal origins were known to the citizens of Harrogate. His parents survived, living locally, until he was 51 years old, and his father shared his name; thus he was known as "Richard Ellis junior" for most of his working life. Richard Ellis senior (c.1794 – 7 September 1871), (Note: GRO index: Deaths Sep 1871 Ellis Richard. 76 Knaresbro' 9a 79) the father of Richard Ellis, was a Harrogate-born blacksmith and farrier from High Harrogate. Richard Ellis senior's forge was in Church Square, close to Christ Church, but after retirement from blacksmithing he lived in 3 Montpellier Terrace where he was a lodging house keeper in the 1850s and 1860s. Ellis' mother was Ann Ellis, who was born in Knaresborough around 1792. By 1871, Richard Ellis senior had retired and was living in Albert Terrace with his wife Ann, who died in Harrogate aged 80 on 12 February 1872. (Note: GRO index:Deaths Mar 1872 Ellis Ann 80 Knaresbro' 9a 96)

Richard Ellis junior was born in Harrogate in November 1820, and was one of nine siblings. He had a twin brother, John Ellis (1820 – 28 March 1876), who was a smith like their father and their brother Thomas (born c. 1826). In 1841 there were three other brothers, joiner Samuel (c. 1827 – 14 August 1898), James (born c. 1830) and George (born c. 1835), and a sister Margaret (born c. 1828), living with them at Smythy Hill (which no longer exists) next to Strawberry Dale, Harrogate. Richard Ellis junior was a cabinetmaker at that time, possibly in the final year of his apprenticeship.

At Halifax Parish Church on 24 December 1845, when still working as a joiner, Ellis married Mary Jane Bates (1822 – 5 August 1897), (Note: GRO index: Deaths Sep 1897 Ellis Mary Jane 75 Knaresbro' 9a 74) daughter of James Bates, a wool sorter of Halifax. They had no children.

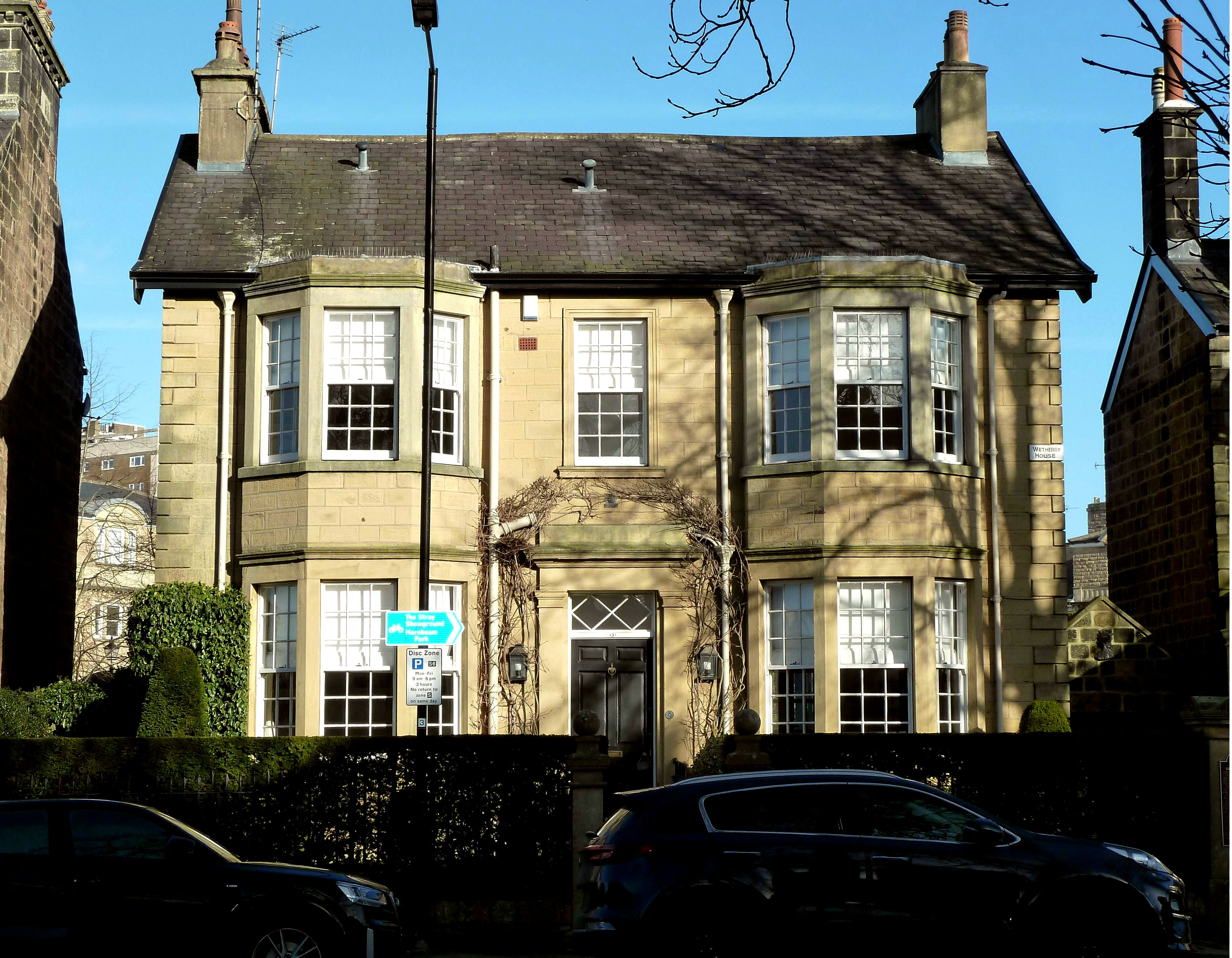
Wetherby House, one of Ellis' abodes

The England Census 1841–1891 describes to some extent the arc of Ellis' business career. In 1851, the Census finds Richard Ellis junior as a lodger in London, where he was exhibiting his Harrogate mineral waters display cabinet at the Great Exhibition. At that time he was a master cabinetmaker employing 15 men, and was lodging with a contingent of Yorkshire artists, including Thomas Holroyd. By 1861, Ellis and his wife were living in York Place, Harrogate, and Ellis was describing himself as a joiner and cabinetmaker, and a master employing 33 men and boys. In 1871, Richard and Mary Jane Ellis were living in Southfield House, South Station Parade. At the age of 50, Ellis was describing himself as a retired contractor. In 1881, the couple were still at Southfield House, and Ellis was describing himself as a magistrate. The 1891 Census finds the couple at Southfield House, where Mary Jane has a companion and nurse, and Ellis is still practising as a West Riding magistrate at the age of 70 years.

In spite of what the Census states, Ellis built and lived in Wetherby House, 9 Queen's Parade, Harrogate, facing the east end of Victoria Avenue, for many years, possibly concurrently with Southfield House for some of the time. Southfield house, which Ellis built for himself on the corner of Station Parade and York Place, was demolished, and was replaced with a modern office block, which retains the house name. (Note: There is a 1975 photo of Southfield House on page 144 of Wells & Swells (2022) by Malcolm Neesam, There is a brown plaque on the gatepost of the replacement office building; see The Heritage Plaques of Harrogate, plaque no.3.) Wetherby House now displays a brown plaque dedicated to him by Harrogate Civic Society.

== Career ==
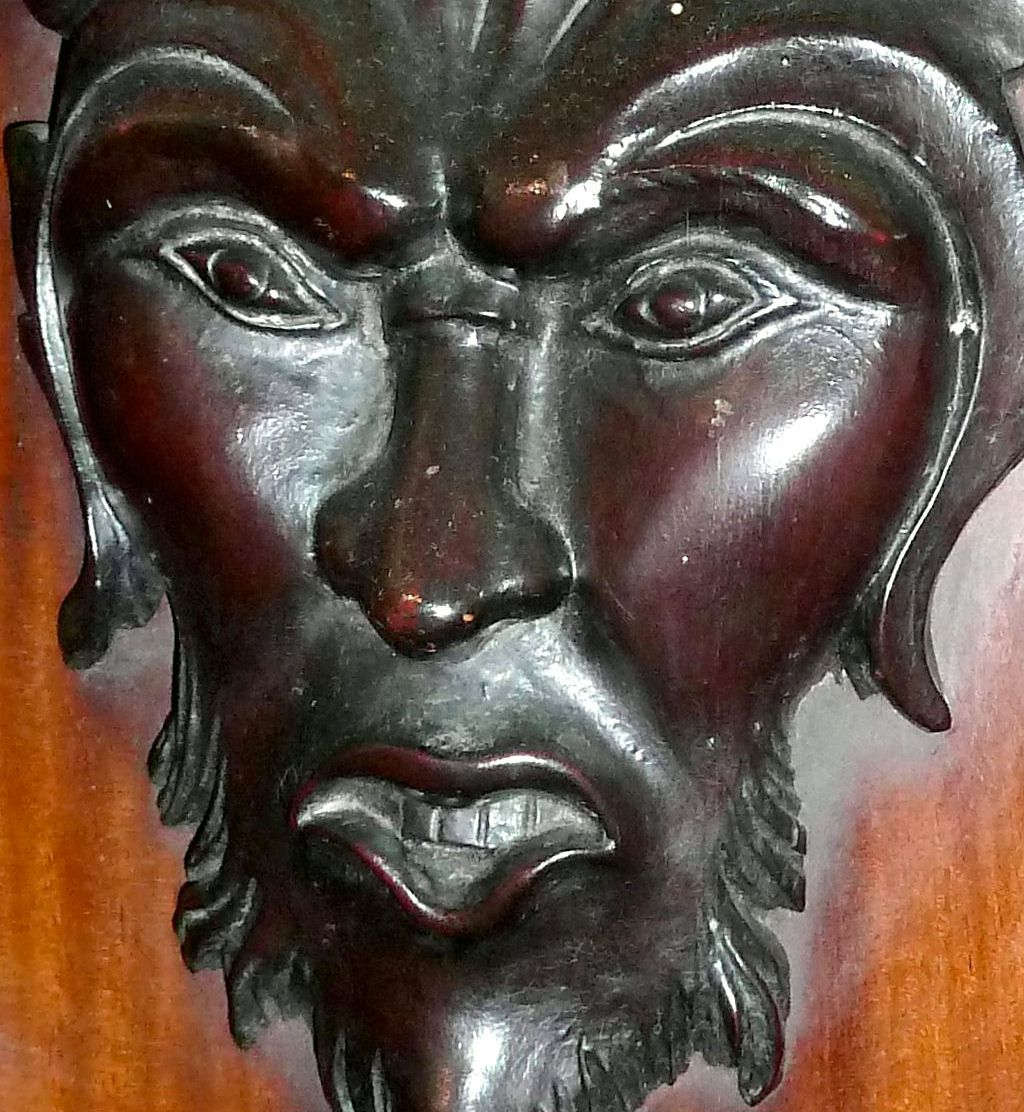
Detail of a water deity on Ellis' Great Exhibition cabinet (in Royal Pump Room)

Ellis was apprenticed as a cabinetmaker and joiner, working at first as a labourer. During or before 1849 he started his own building firm, as joiner and builder.

"Ellis himself made the wooden display cabinet for the town's mineral waters shown at the Crystal Palace Exhibition in 1851". Ellis had won a design competition for this piece, and the prize was £30 15s (equivalent to £1,659.65 in 2025). The piece was described in the Leeds Intelligencer as follows:

From Harrogate – Richard Ellis jun., a mahogany case, French polished, divided into compartments, to hold vases (containing the celebrated local waters), elaborately carved, and surmounted with a representation of the Royal Pump Room. The case is to be lined with crimson silk velvet, and the back to be formed of silvered plate glass. Dimensions [h x w] 6 by 4.5 feet (1.8 by 1.4 m).

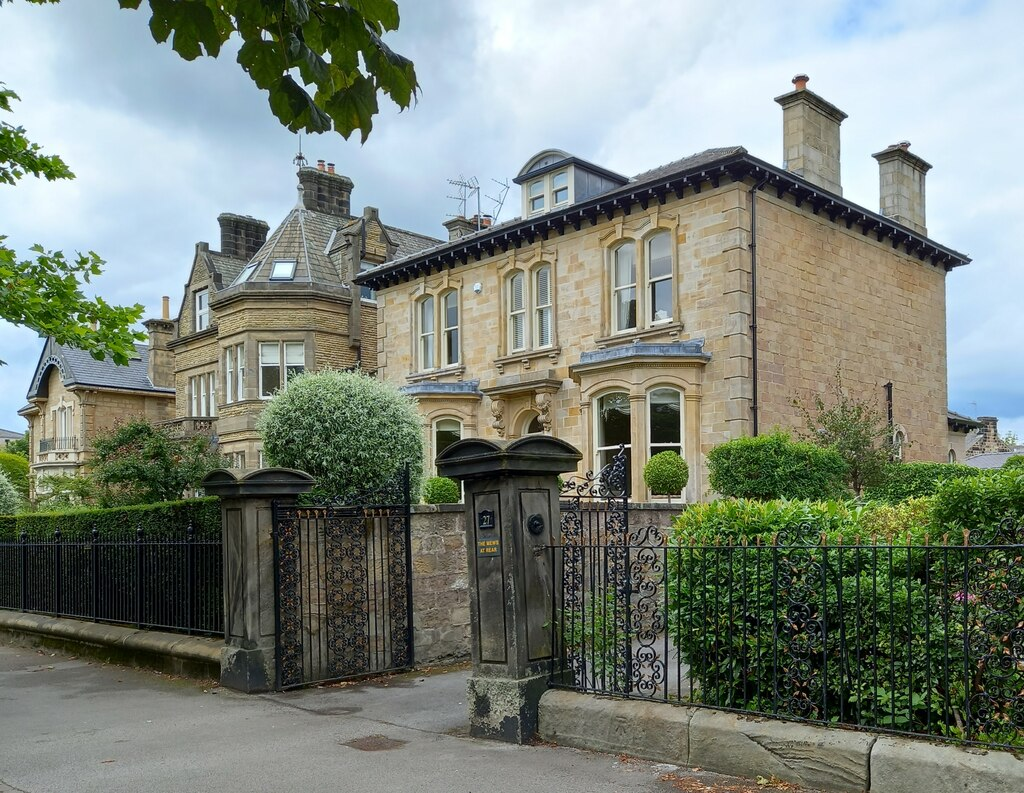
Villas erected on York Place by Ellis

Ellis' first build was The New Inn (later renamed The Dragon) on Skipton Road, Harrogate. His business grew, and in due course he was building "extensively on Queen Parade, York Place, Station Parade and James Street, his buildings being of high structural quality and architectural excellence".In 1860 he founded, with the Carter Brothers, the Victoria Park Company. The purpose of this foundation was "the express purpose of joining the two ancient villages of High and Low Harrogate into a single modern borough", and of course the company profitably developed the land between. Harrogate's historian Malcolm Neesam called this "one of Ellis' great achievements". The former mansion, Belvedere, Victoria Avenue, in Harrogate, was built by Ellis around 1861 for John Smith, as a retirement residence. The house name was originally spelled "Belvidere". After Harrogate railway station was completed in 1862, Ellis resolved a civic "row" over a lack of public access to the station by building East Parade and having his wife open it in 1875. "The show-streets of Victoria Avenue and Station Parade, together with their ancillary streets, created the modern town of Harrogate". Ellis became known as the Bismarck of Harrogate.

== Civic contributions ==
As a rich and prolific builder and developer, Ellis was an influential man, and he was a benefactor to the town. Around 1855 he was "elected a representative of the town on the old Local Board, and he continued his connection with the public body on the adoption of the Local Improvement Act, being only defeated once at an election". He "played a key role" in persuading the Duchy of Lancaster, which owned The Stray, to exchange land in order to permit the building of a new replacement railway line. This line would have a station in central Harrogate to be completed in 1862 (now called Harrogate railway station). Lancaster would lose land on the South Stray where the new railway cutting would be made, but it would gain the land whereon the old Brunswick station (Harrogate) previously stood. In this matter, Ellis was "one of the pioneers of Harrogate's prosperity", and a promoter of "long term investment in the town's infrastructure".

As chairman of the Improvement Commissioners, in 1871, Ellis laid the foundation stone for Harrogate's New Victoria Baths, which cost £11,000 (equivalent to £1,120,262 in 2025) and included baths for visitors, and reservoirs for the storage of mineral waters. (Note: The New Victoria Baths (1871) was not the same building as the later Royal Baths (1894–1897), designed by Bagalley and Bristowe, which now stands almost opposite the site of the New Victoria Baths, on the other side of Crescent Gardens, and as of 2022 contains a Chinese restaurant.) The building was to be Harrogate Corporation's "own suite of treatment rooms and bathing pools", for public use, and "constituted the commencement of the history of Harrogate as a first class bathing resort". The public did not approve of the funds spent on it, and Ellis lost his seat as a councillor or alderman. However, "he was soon returned when the public came to realise the value of Ellis's public service and expertise. The great success of the Victoria Baths was testimony to the soundness of Ellis' judgement". The building was later to be redeveloped into Harrogate Borough Council's municipal buildings. "He took a prominent interest in the promotion of the Harrogate Cottage Hospital, also in the erection of the palatial Royal Bath Hospital, and Hospital Convalescent Home", of which latter two he was a governor. (Note: The Royal Bath Hospital is now converted into flats, and is known as Ellis House, Ellis Court, Harrogate.)

It was Ellis who provided and personally paid for the trees, verges and roundabouts which still exist in Victoria Avenue. He was a key figure in the building of Ashville College. He formally opened it in 1877, and was one of its governors, and a benefactor to it. He was a "liberal subscriber" to various charities, and to "local and philanthropic organisations". He was a benefactor to Harrogate Royal Infirmary (a predecessor to Harrogate District Hospital, and now St Peter's School), having supported the idea of building it, and having laid its foundation stone in 1882. As mayor, in 1887, Ellis paid for the Jubilee Memorial, and donated the land on which it stands. His last major public action was "to support and encourage the building of the Royal Baths" so as to raise the town's social position as a spa – although he did not live to see it opened.

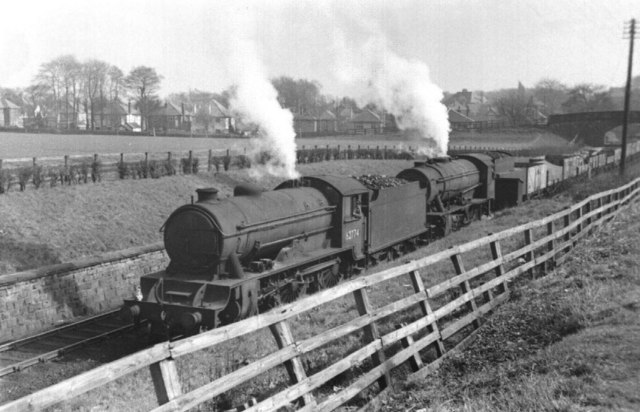
Railway cutting on The Stray, a result of Ellis' negotiations

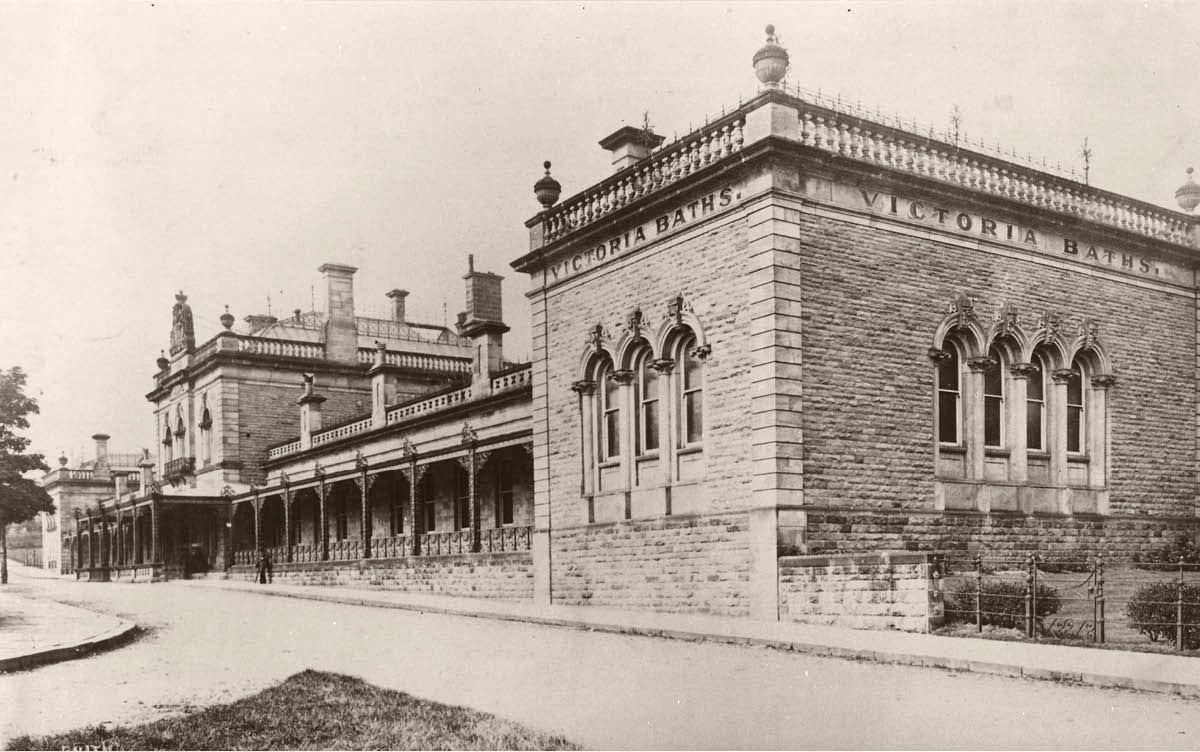
New Victoria Baths, built 1871, promoted by Ellis

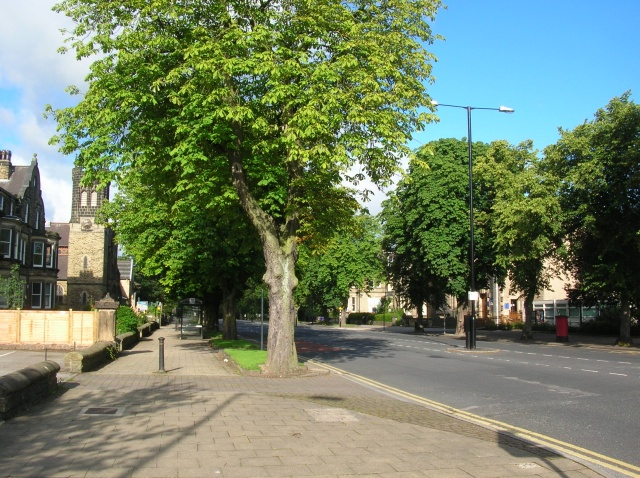
Trees and verges on Victoria Avenue, donated by Ellis

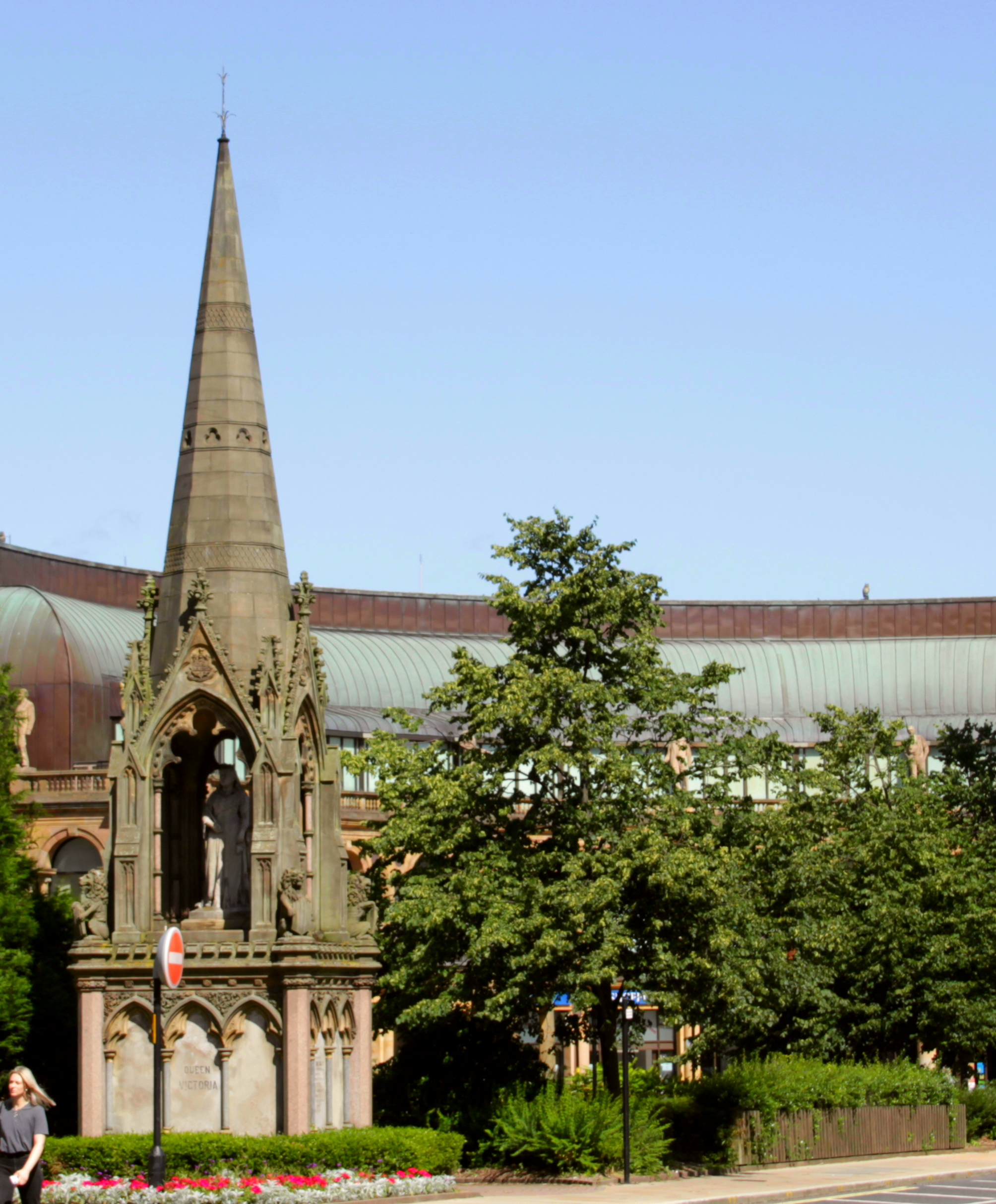
Jubilee Memorial on land donated by Ellis

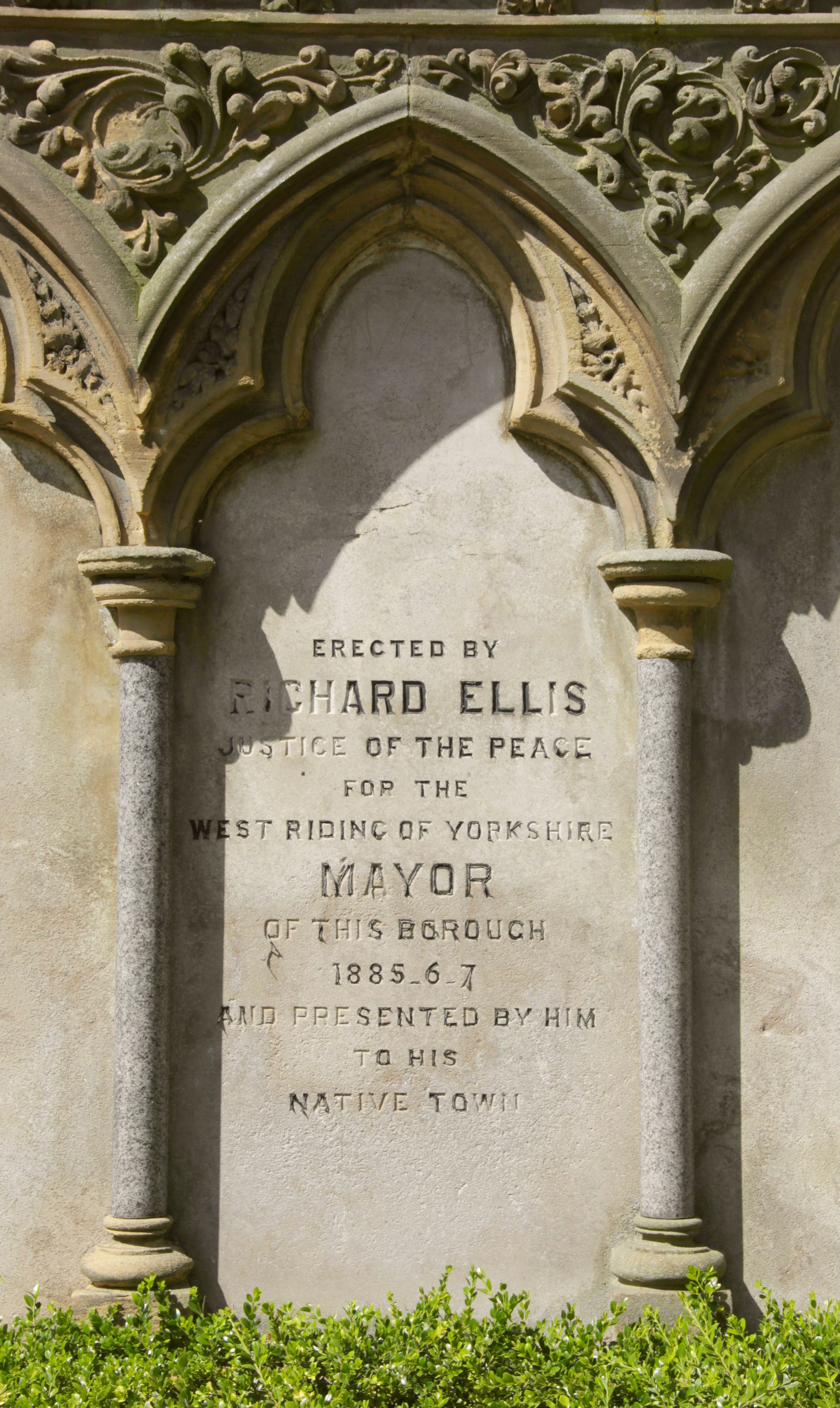
Dedication to Ellis on the Jubilee Memorial

=== Mayor of Harrogate ===
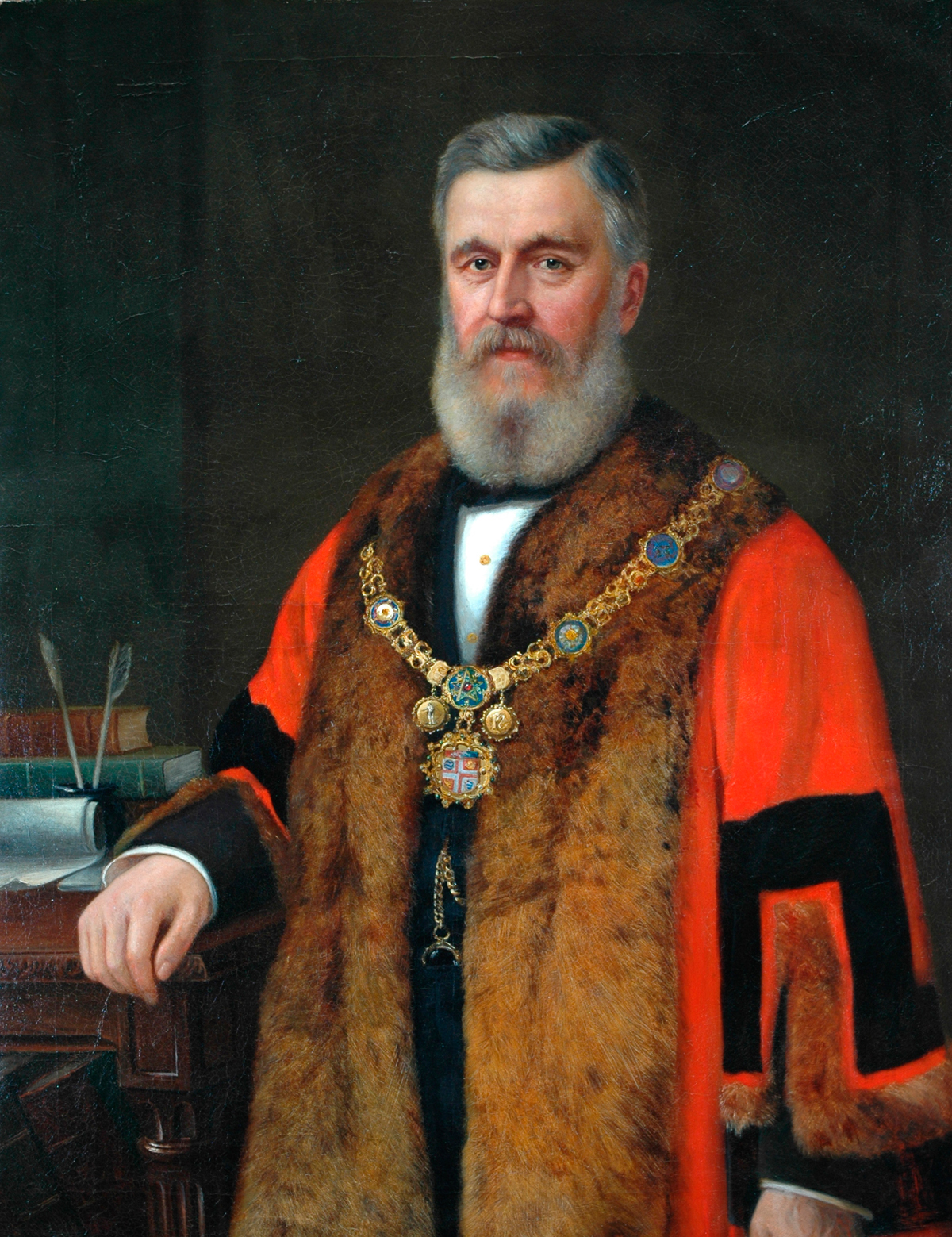
Mayor Richard Ellis by Holroyd, 1884

Ellis was "one of the greatest supporters of Harrogate's bid for a Charter of incorporation". The Charter was received in 1884, and Ellis was Mayor of Harrogate from 1884 to 1887. (He was not the first mayor: Robert Ackrill was the Charter Mayor, and Nicholas Carter was the first formal mayor). He was one of the first aldermen of Harrogate Corporation, and continued as an alderman until he died. Ellis donated to the town the robes of office for its aldermen and councillors in 1884, and the mayoress's chain in 1902, "to demonstrate that the decorative embellishments of incorporation need not be at public expense".

== Institutions ==
Ellis was a "West Riding and Borough Justice of the Peace, and frequently occupied the chair at the Knaresborough Petty Sessions, also on the Harrogate Borough Bench". He supported "a great number of religious, educational and commercial institutions". In April 1855, he was elected onto Harrogate's Improvement Commissioners Board, and in due course became its chairman. As a board member, he promoted the improvement of "long-term investment in the town's infrastructure" and the development of Harrogate's spa.

Ellis supported voting reform and public health institutions. He was a benefactor of Methodist churches, supporting "at no small personal expense" the building of the first James Street Methodist Chapel in 1851, and the church which succeeded it, the Victoria Park Methodist Church of 1854–1865 (demolished, 1954). He was a trustee of, and benefactor of, that church, and a member of its congregation. He was chairman of the Pannal School Board, and for many years and up to his death was chairman of the Knaresborough Board of Guardians. He was an alderman of West Riding County Council (WRCC), and president of Harrogate Liberal Club and Harrogate Horticultural Society.

== Death and funeral ==
Ellis died at his home in Southfield House, Harrogate, on 21 August 1895, aged 74 years.

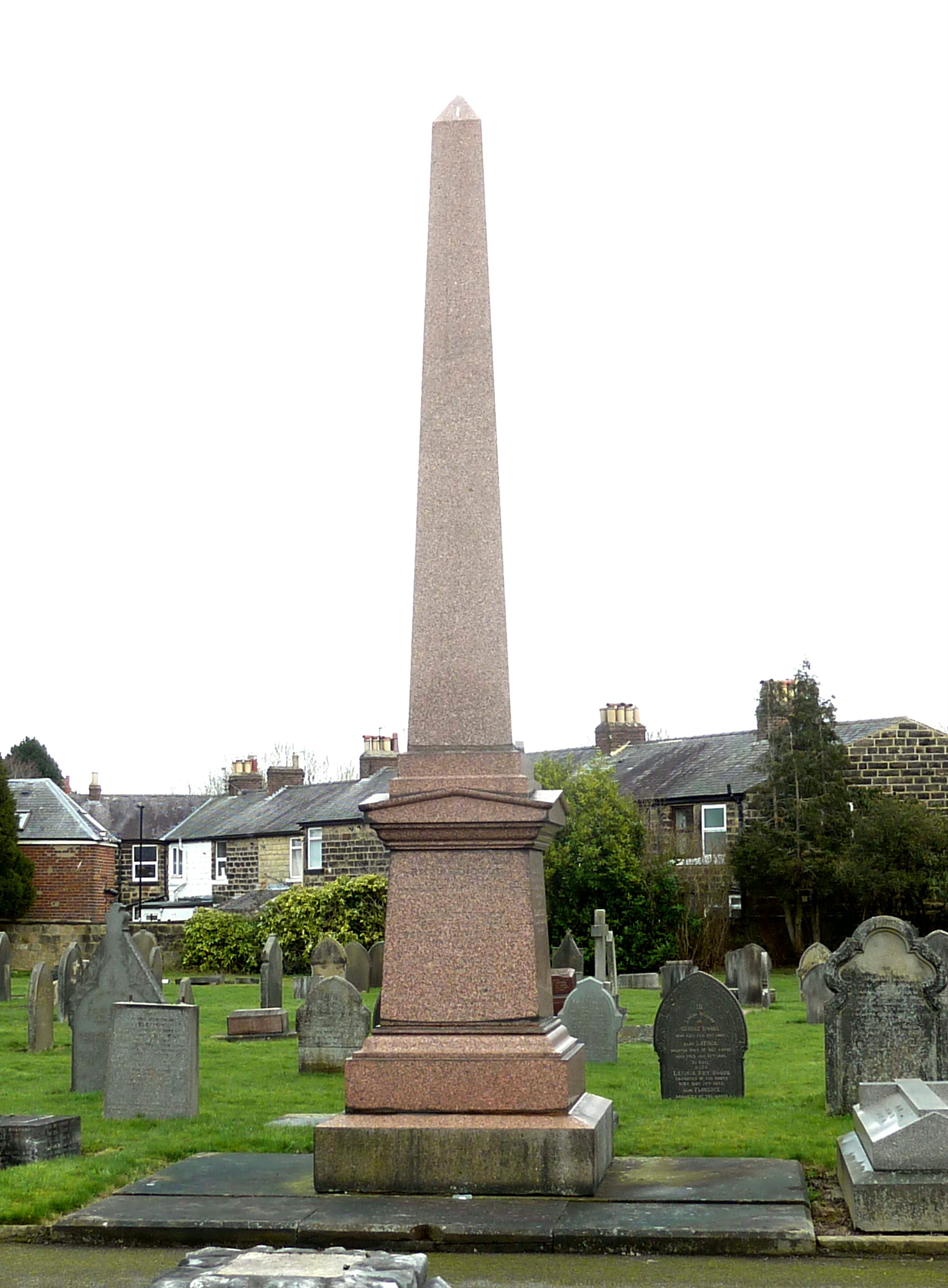
Ellis's grave monument

Ellis' funeral was held on 24 August 1895. A long procession carried "wreaths and floral tributes ... very numerous and of an exquisite description", in dedicated carriages, between houses and shops with blinds respectfully drawn. Men following the coffin represented numerous local institutions with which Ellis had been involved: the Borough Police, the Fire Brigade, West Riding County Council, Harrogate Corporation including the mayor and borough officials, the borough justices, solicitors and barristers from the Borough Court, Harrogate Gas Company, Bradford Old Bank, Bath and Cottage Hospital, West Riding Magistrates, Knaresborough Board of Guardians including the workhouse master and relieving officer, Harrogate Liberal Club, Harrogate Steam Laundry Company, the People's Hotel Company, the Harrogate Hydropathic Company, Harrogate Horticultural Society, and the medical profession. From Southfield House, the cortège processed via Station Parade (where Ellis had built) via James Street (where Ellis had also built) to James Street Methodist Free Church for the funeral service.which was conducted by six ministers including the general missionary secretary from Leeds.

At Grove Road Cemetery the funeral procession for Ellis was met by "a vast concourse of spectators", and the burial rite was performed by three ministers. The coffin, which was lowered into Ellis' family vault near to George Dawson's family plot, "was of polished oak with heavy brass furniture, and bore the following inscription: Richard Ellis, J.P., died August 21st, 1895, aged 74 years".

=== Will and bequests ===
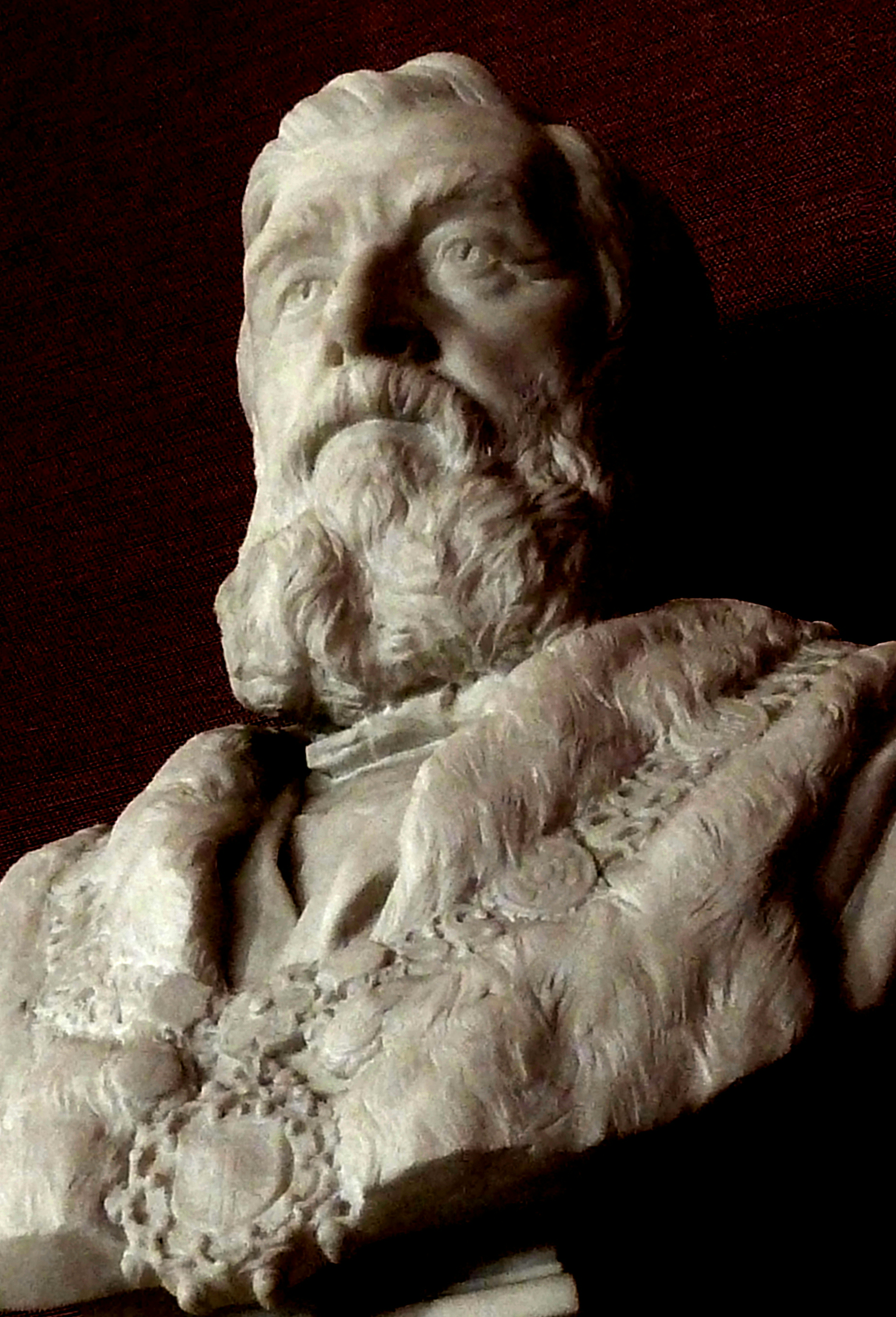
Richard Ellis by Webber, 1888

Ellis' will was proved in London on 23 October 1895. The executors were Methodist minister Edward Booden, solicitor Edwin Raworth, Ellis' brother and cab proprietor Thomas Ellis, and his nephew and ironmonger John Richrd Ellis. His effects were valued at £12,811 (equivalent to £1,456,407 in 2025).

Ellis bequeathed to Harrogate Corporation, following the decease of his wife, the marble busts of his wife Mary Jane and himself by William John Seward Webber. They were presented to Ellis in 1888, in recognition of the work done by them both, and they were paid for by public subscription. Also bequeathed to the corporation at the same time was the portrait of himself by Thomas Holroyd which had been presented by Holroyd to Ellis in 1884, the year in which he was elected mayor.

== Obituaries ==
As one of Harrogate's first mayors, and as the developer who had joined two small villages to make the town of Harrogate, Richard Ellis was appreciated in his home town: "Ellis was mild and softly spoken, given to humorous or kindly asides, and seems to have seldom been rattled by his opponents' hositility or malice". An address that was presented to Ellis in 1887 said, "Your labours [have] been so unremitting as often to cause anxiety to your friends". Historian Malcolm Neesam said, "Even in an age notable for the number of public benefactors, Ellis' devotion to Harrogate must be classed as outstanding".

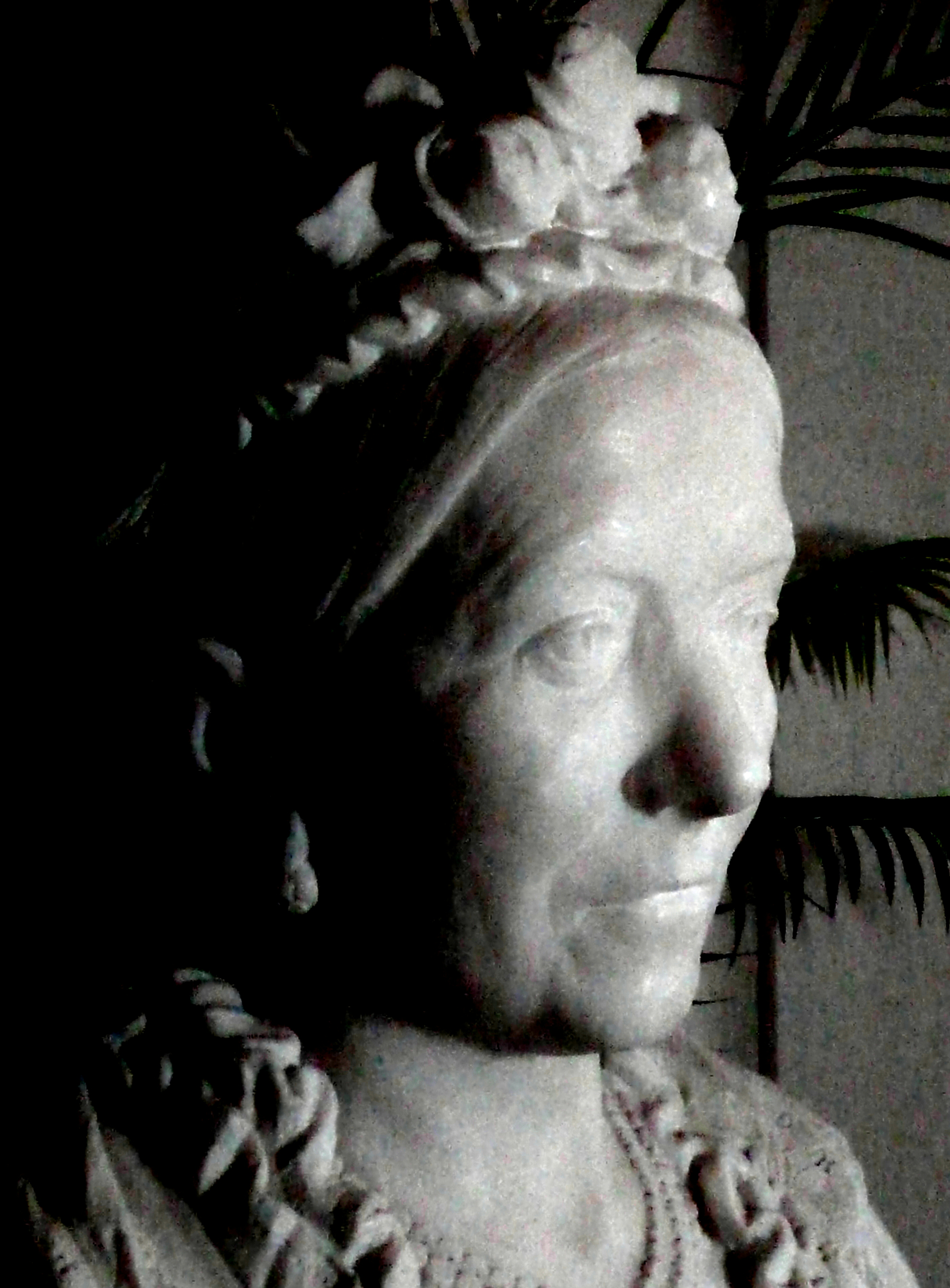
Mary Jane Ellis, by Webber, 1888

Unusually for a working-class, self-made man in that time and place, Ellis had social skills which were noticed: "[Ellis] was greatly respected alike as citizen and magistrate, and also for his shrewd character, great experience, and judicious advice ... His many ... acts will long remain in the memory of the people of Harrogate, for which town he had done so much". It is possible that the driving force, behind the dedication to the town of Ellis and his wife, was that they had no children for whom to build up their business for the family future. Whatever the reason, they devoted themselves entirely to the benefit of the town. Solicitor Edwin Raworth said that Ellis was a "man whose generosity was such a powerful factor for good", and that his wife Mary Jane was, "an amiable lady who did everything she could to help her husband in his endeavours".

What is notable in Harrogate's obituaries of its late Alderman, is the extent to which Ellis was admired and liked. Harrogate mayor J.H. Wilson said of Ellis:

Amongst all the men who were pioneers of the success of Harrogate, the name of Ellis ... must be cherished as one of the foremost and most capable men ... [One] could not but be struck by the marvellous business capacity and the true endeavours to do what he could for the good of the town. He was a man who thoroughly realised the capabilities of the place. He never saw things with a wild excitement, but with a calm and business perception that could not but be admired, and he was always willing to go forward with anything that would further the progress of the town. Even in his later days, when it often happened that men became more timid, they always found him to the very fore in urging on a bold, progressive policy for the borough of Harrogate ... While Mr Ellis had a thorough desire to economise, he always desired a thing to be well done. Mrs Ellis ... all knew her as a mayoress, and how courteous, and with what modesty she fulfilled her duties.

Wilson summarised the importance of the couple to Harrogate, saying that Ellis was "one of the most respected men that ever took part in the government of Harrogate", and that Mrs Ellis was, "a woman who, in [an] enthusiastic manner won the hearts of everybody ... She was a perfect helpmeet to Mr Ellis during his career".
