= Mercer Art Gallery =

British art gallery

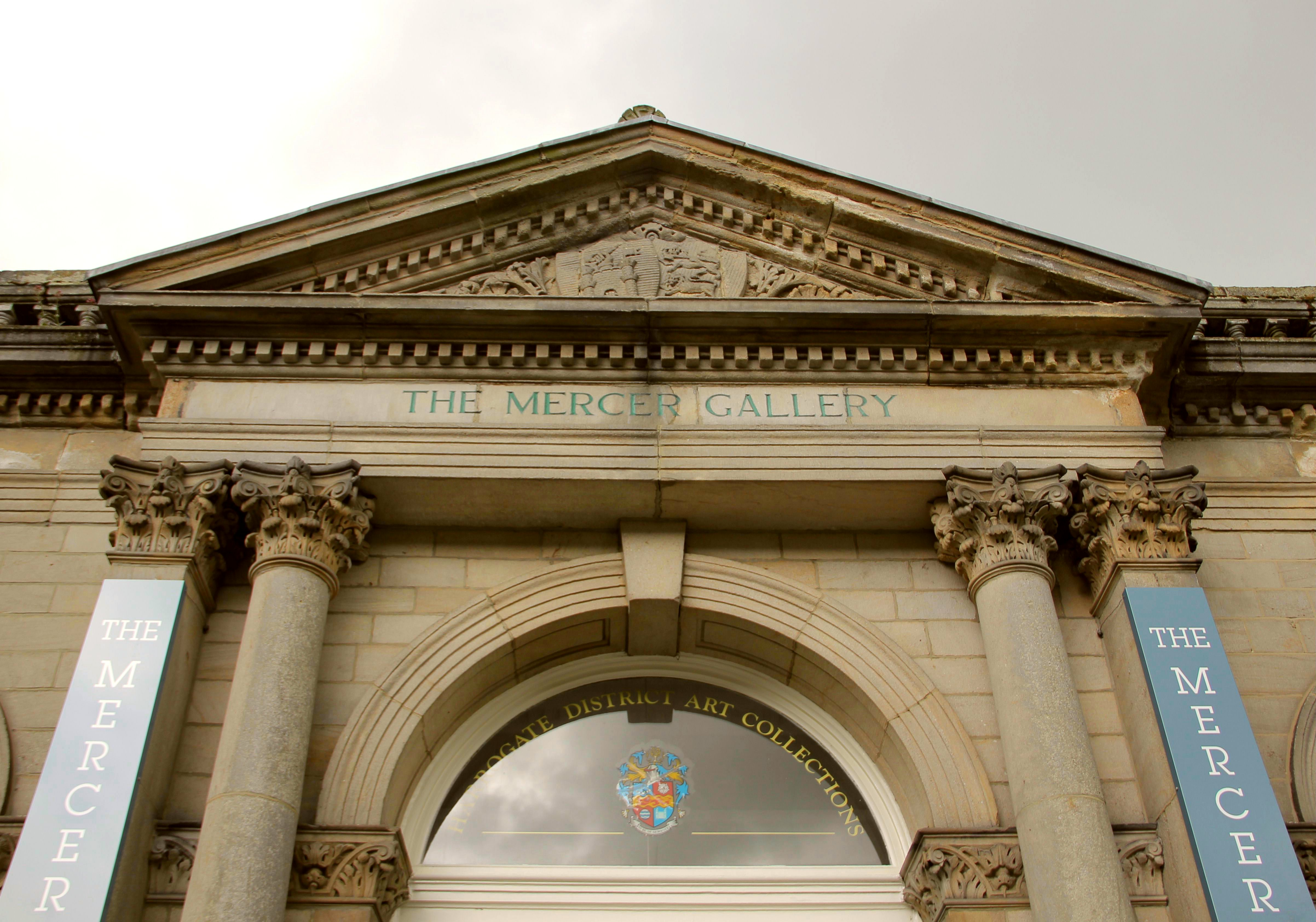
- Portico of the Mercer Art Gallery
- Location: 31, Swan Road, Harrogate, North Yorkshire
- Coordinates: 53°59′40″N 1°32′49″W
- Type: Art gallery
- Key holdings: Local and national artworks; Walker Neesam Archive
- Collections: British 19th- to 21st-century art.
- Collection size: c. 2,000 works
- Architect: Arthur Hiscoe (1876 rebuild)
- Owner: North Yorkshire Council
- Website: Mercer Art Gallery, Friends of the Mercer Art Gallery and Mercer Gallery on Facebook

The Mercer Art Gallery, formerly the Mercer Gallery and locally known as The Mercer, is an art gallery in Harrogate, North Yorkshire, England. It was established in Lower Harrogate's Old Town Hall building in 1991. Owned by North Yorkshire Council, it has a collection of over 2,000 items, mainly 19th- to 21st-century artworks, including pieces by local artists. It hosts a rolling series of exhibitions of its own and borrowed artworks, keeping most of its own collection in storage for much of the time, or loaned out to exhibitions at other galleries, and to local establishments.

In 2022, local historian Malcolm Neesam bequeathed the Walker Neesam Archive to the gallery. The Mercer also continues to acquire and exhibit items of contemporary and local art. One of its recent acquisitions is a set of drawings by Eva Leigh, which it exhibited in 2024.

== Gallery ==
This gallery was originally known as the Harrogate Fine Art Collection, whose gallery was opened by Henry Lascelles, 6th Earl of Harewood in 1930 above the present public library in Victoria Avenue, Harrogate, North Yorkshire. In 1984 the Harrogate Fine Art Collection was stored in the basement of the Royal Baths, but the cellar flooded, destroying some works. In 1989 the Old Town Hall in Harrogate, which had been used as the council's rates office, became available, but it was in poor condition with a hole in the ceiling of the main hall. The previously grand hall had "false walls and ceilings concealing the once exquisite plaster decoration". A silver service banquet was given in the dilapidated hall, to launch the fund for the new gallery. A public appeal was made; it raised £110,000. Ultimately the basement was converted into a storage area for the gallery's collection, and the ground floor was refurbished. The Mercer Gallery (now the Mercer Art Gallery and known locally as The Mercer) was established in the Old Town Hall building in Swan Road, Lower Harrogate, and opened by George Lascelles, 7th Earl of Harewood on 30 April 1991.

The gallery was named after the watercolourist Sidney Agnew Mercer after his sons Terence and Gavin Mercer donated £50,000 towards it. The establishment of the gallery cost £360,000 in total. In order to continue to support the gallery financially alongside Harrogate Borough Council, The Friends of the Mercer Gallery was formed in 1992. For nearly thirty years the Friends group was led by Judith Thomas. After she stepped down in 2020, May Catt of Harrogate Borough Council said, "Without the Friends with Judith at the helm, the Mercer would not have been able to establish itself as the excellent arts venue that it is today".

The gallery has ramped access at a side door, a hearing induction loop, and a toilet with space for wheelchairs. It offers "an extensive education programme for children and adults".

=== Exhibitions ===
When the Mercer Art Gallery first opened, it was using at least some of its space for permanent exhibition. For example, in May 1991, some paintings by the Knaresborough artist Joseph Baker Fountain were on permanent exhibition. Today, the gallery's collection of fine art is too large for the whole to be displayed permanently, so most of it is shown in a rolling series of themed exhibitions, alongside exhibitions of works temporarily loaned from other sources. The Contemporary Art Society says, "A diverse exhibition programme that weaves together historic and contemporary art in exciting and thought provoking ways runs throughout the year".

In 2009 the gallery initiated the Open People's Prize of £100 to be presented at the Harrogate Open Exhibitions. In September 2010 the gallery held one of the Open Exhibitions. It displayed 187 works by local artists.

From October 2012 until January 2013 the gallery again held the Harrogate Open Exhibition, featuring 206 works including ceramics, jewellery, sculpture, prints and paintings. The prize fund had by this year risen to £1,000, the top prize being £200.

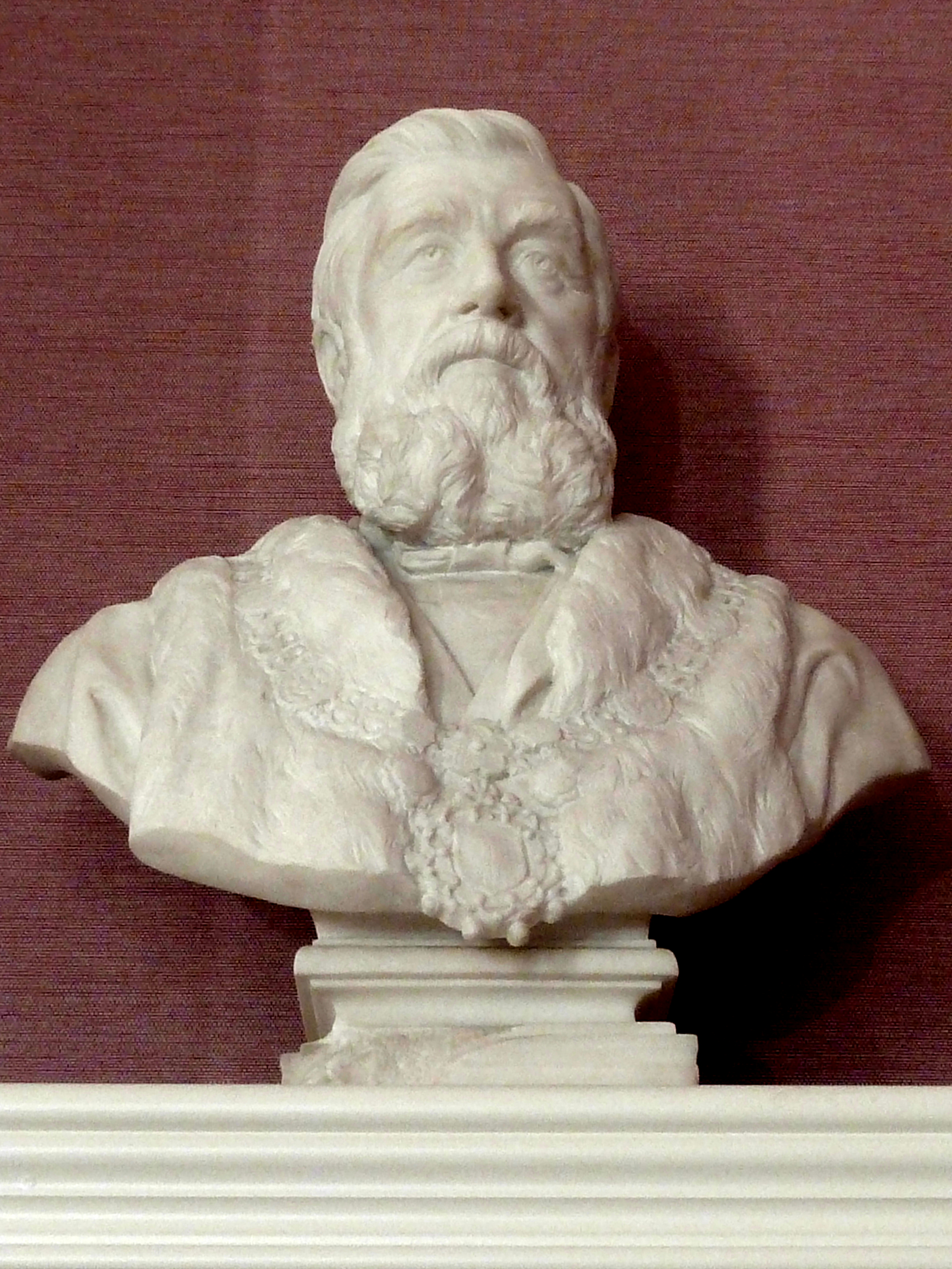
Richard Ellis (1888) by Webber

In 2014, the Mercer showed its Facing the Future exhibition, which featured 18th- to early 20th-century sculpture and paintings from its own collection. It included many of its works by William John Seward Webber, and examples of works by Florence Fitzgerald, daughter of John Anster Fitzgerald, Pietro Castoldi, Giovanni Maria Benzoni, Anthony Welsh, Thomas Holroyd, Bernard Walter Evans, Adrien Carpentiers and Frances Darlington.

In January 2018, The Mercer launched its Picturing Women exhibition, at the centennial anniversary of the enfranchisement of women as voters. It featured female artists and their works from the gallery's collection, including Touchstone by Eileen Cooper (1983), works by Sonia Lawson and Sarah Pickstone, Artist as a Model (1982) by Rose Garrard, and photography by Julia Margaret Cameron. The exhibition closed in June 2018.

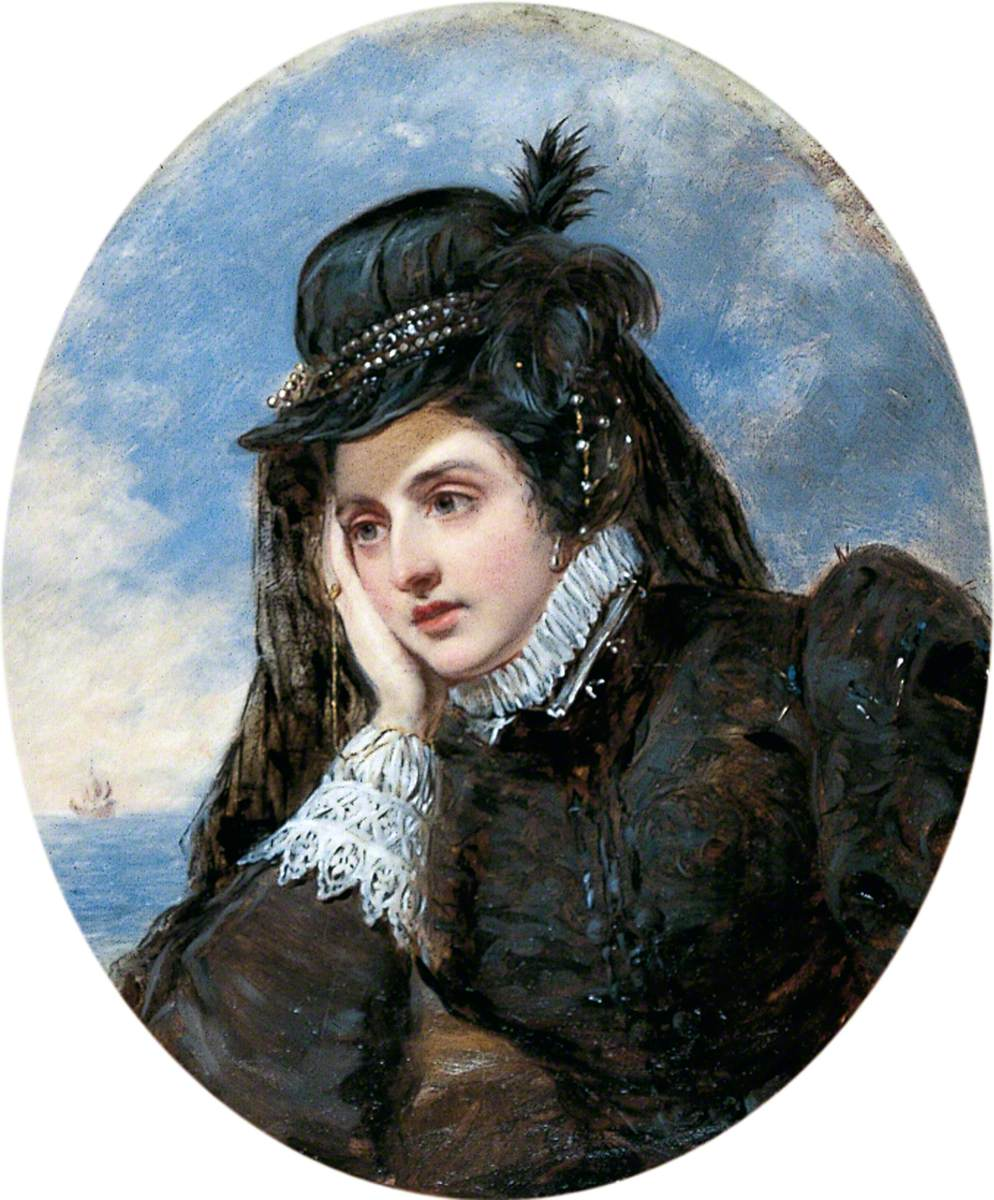
Marie Stuart by Frith, 1893

Between February and June 2019 the gallery held its Linescapes exhibition, featuring the printmaker Ian Mitchell's digitally-created prints of the Yorkshire landscape, which had been pared back to "minimalist lines and shapes". From June 2019 the gallery opened its William Powell Frith: The People's Painter exhibition, in honour of the bicentenary of his birth.

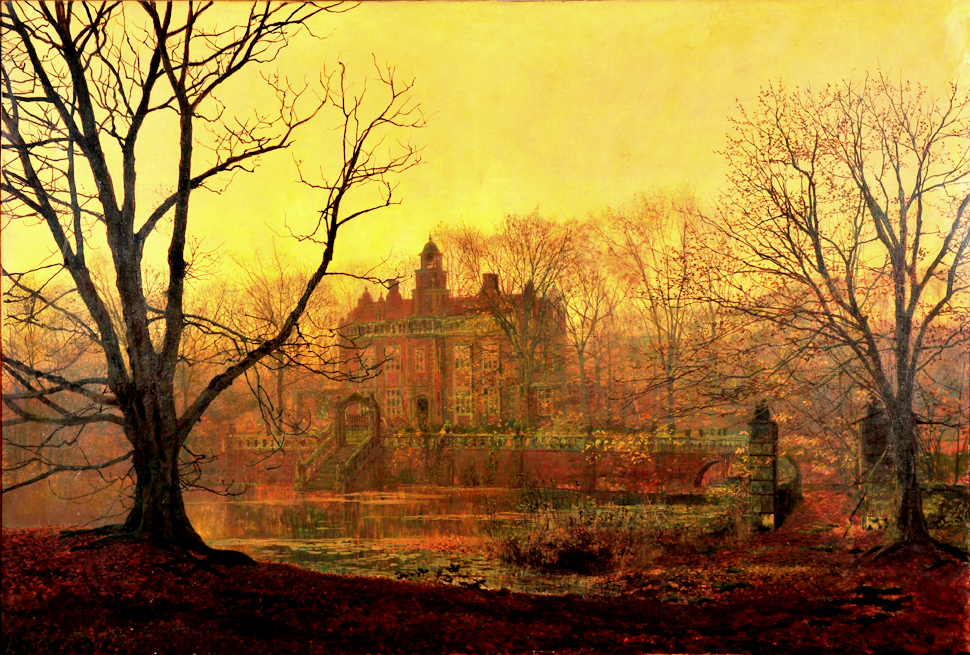
In the Gloaming by Atkinson Grimshaw, 1878

In February 2020 the gallery opened its exhibition, Turner: Northern Exposure. On display were some of J. M. W. Turner's paintings of Yorkshire, and two of his sketchbooks, all relating to his tour of the area in 1797. Paintings of Yorkshire by contemporary artists Anna Lilleengen, Katherine Holmes, Debbie Loane, Emerson Mayes and Ed Kluz were hung alongside those by Turner. Also hung beside the Turners were works by John Atkinson Grimshaw.

In 2020 and 2021, the gallery organised online exhibitions calling for submissions for React2: Art Created Through Covid-19 and React2, Our Planet, Our Home. The first was a response to the COVID-19 pandemic, which had made real-life exhibitions difficult. The second went live in October 2021, and was about climate change.

Between May and September 2022, The Mercer showed Celebration: British Abstract Painting, which featured numerous artists, including Gary Wragg, Douglas Abercrombie, Francis Davison, Patrick Heron, Albert Irvin, Mali Morris, Gillian Ayres, John Edwards, John Hoyland, Patrick Jones, John McLean and Fred Pollock. Reviewer Graham Chalmers said: "Celebration is a simply stunning collection of nearly 60 paintings by 12 different British Abstract artists - several on a heroic scale". In September 2022, The Mercer launched Open Exhibition, a biennial show, featuring for the first time all-Yorkshire artists besides the previously prioritised Harrogate artists. The exhibition featured ceramics, sculpture, paintings and drawings, including works by the musician Candie Payne. The exhibition closed in January 2023.

Between April and July 2023 the gallery presented Artist Rooms, a touring exhibition featuring the Yorkshire-born artist Martin Creed, who filled the main gallery of the Mercer with over a thousand balls of different sizes. Between 2023 and 2024, Kate Bentley had a solo exhibition of paintings at The Mercer.

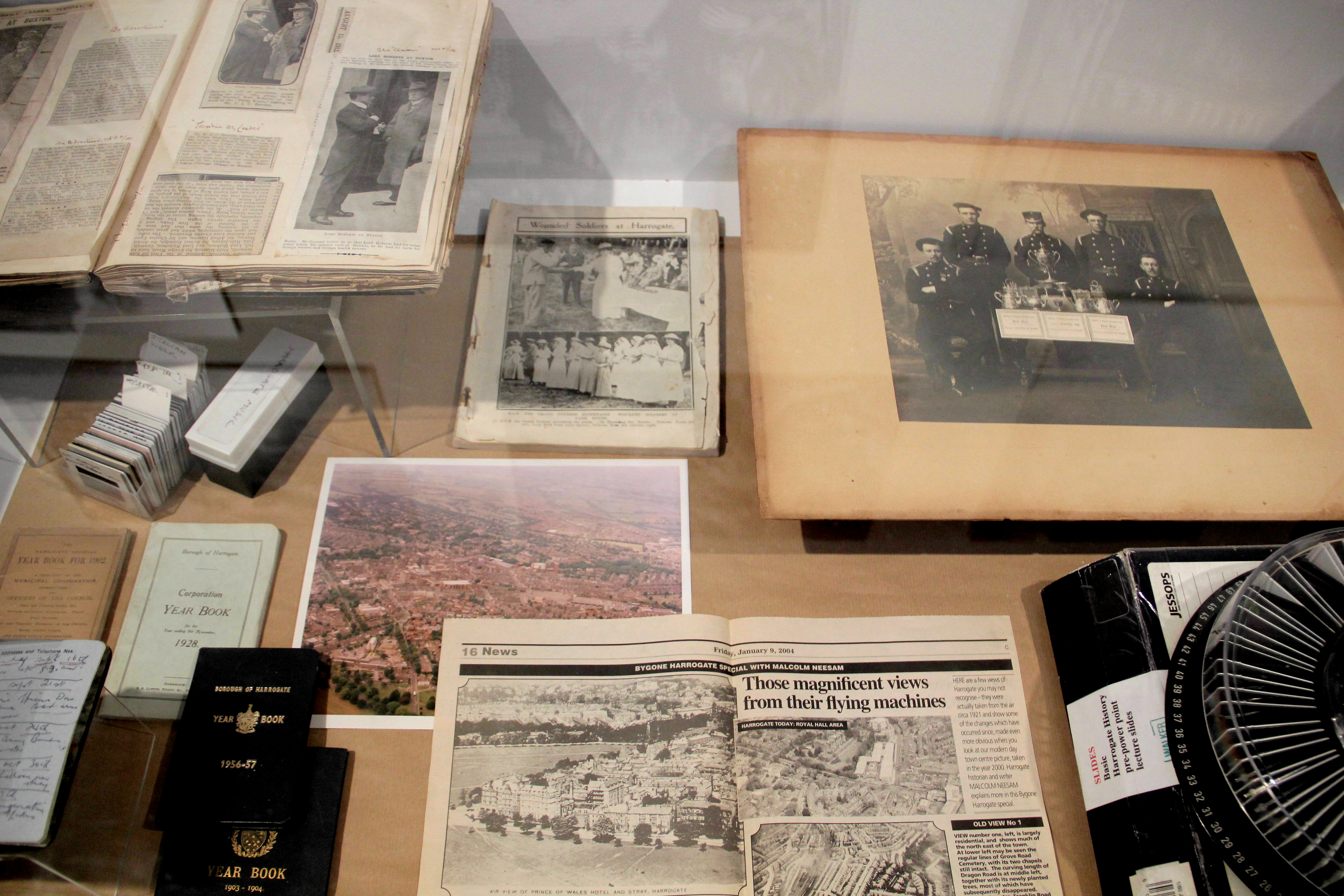
Walker Neesam Archive display, 2024 (detail)

Between March and August 2024, The Mercer curated a display showing Harrogate's Historian. A first look at the Walker Neesam Archive. This revealed examples from the archive of local historian Malcolm Neesam, who died in 2022 and bequeathed his collection to The Mercer. Between May and September 2024, the gallery featured artist David Remfry's pencil and watercolour portraits of people and dogs in its We Think the World of You exhibition. At the same time it was showing the drawings and silhouettes of a newly rediscovered early-20th-century female artist, in its Eva Leigh Walker exhibition. In 2024 The Mercer advertised that it was to show the New Light Prize exhibition 2023–2024, between October 2024 and January 2025. This is a touring biennial prize exhibition, established in 2010 to celebrate and promote the visual arts in the North of England.

=== Collection ===
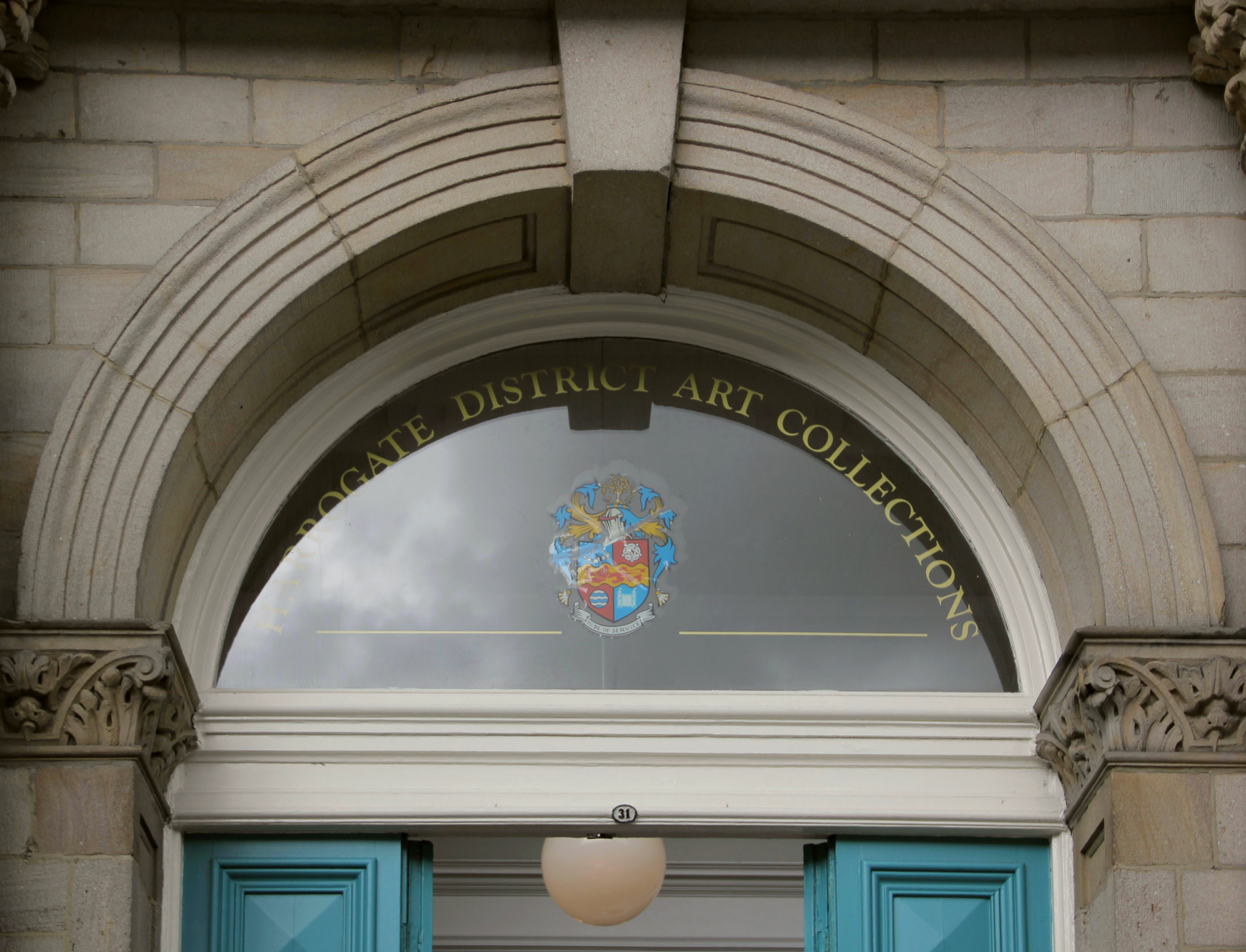
Fanlight above the entrance, naming the art collection

By the time the Mercer Art Gallery opened in Swan Road in 1991, its collection already numbered at least 1,000 works, and had been accumulated over some time. For example, in 1904 the Holroyd bequest gave Harrogate Corporation the works of Thomas Holroyd, plus Holroyd's art collection including sculptures by W. J. S. Webber. Some of Webber's busts remain in the collection, along with a few of Holroyd's paintings, but Holroyd's heavily-carved, wooden photographic props and Webber's heroic marble sculpture Warrior with Wounded Youth are missing, the latter last seen in Harrogate Library before 1930. The Warrior sculpture was last recorded with Sloan's auctioneers in 1998, and then for sale again in Miami. However the 1,000 items inherited by The Mercer still include the Kent Collection of Antiquities, which Harrogate Council received as a donation in 1968.

The full name of The Mercer's holdings is the "Harrogate District Fine Art Collection", although it is named "Harrogate District Art Collections" over the door. The gallery now owns around two thousand works. They are mainly British 19th- to 21st-century art, and in recent years more photography and later works have been added. The Contemporary Art Society has funded a number of works in The Mercer's collection, including a set of Paintings of Literary Women by Sarah Pickstone. The gallery loans out some artworks to local establishments, such as the Royal Hall, the Royal Baths, and The Harrogate Club. In 2011 The Mercer lent two Atkinson Grimshaw paintings to the Guildhall Art Gallery in London. In 2022 the gallery lent some items for The Art of Colour, a free, non-commercial exhibition held by Tennants auctioneers in Leyburn.

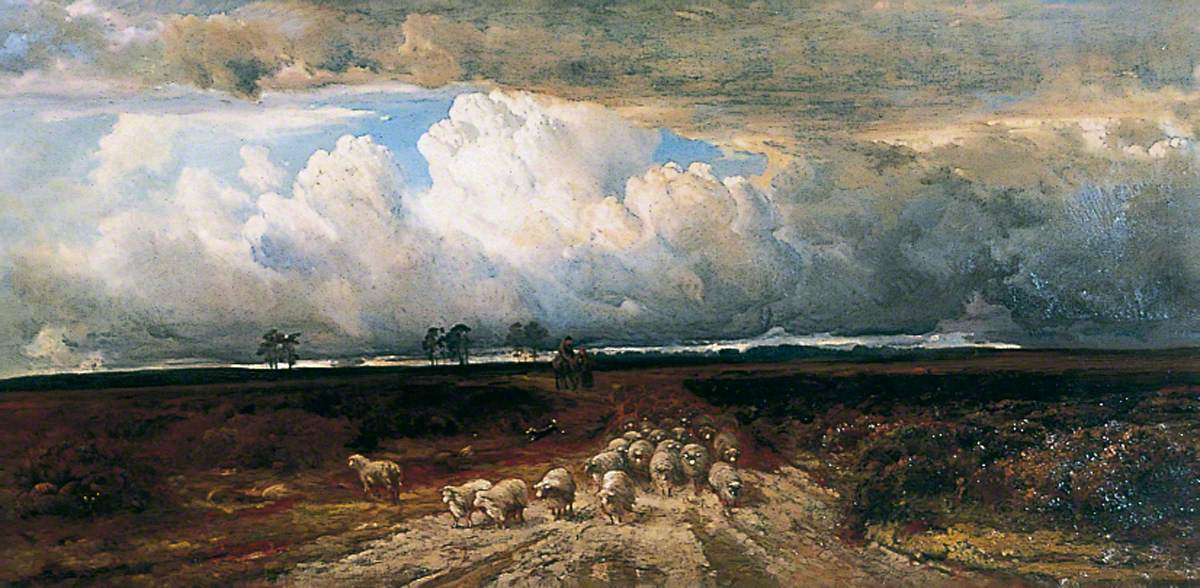
Driving Home the Flock by Bernard Walter Evans

The present collection includes works by: John Adams-Acton, Herbert Washington Addison, Nathaniel Hughes John Baird, Benjamin Barker, Thomas Barker, Wright Barker, William Roxby Beverly, R.W. Brown, Vlaho Bukovac, Augustus Wall Callcott, Joseph Clark, Edward John Cobbett, Thomas Sidney Cooper, Reinier Craeyvanger, Augustus Leopold Egg, Bernard Walter Evans, Emily Eyres, William Powell Frith, P. Garrett, Louis Ginnett, John Atkinson Grimshaw, John Frederick Herring, Thomas Holroyd, Edward Atkinson Hornel, Willis Richard Edwin Hudson, Robert Kirkland Jamieson, Wilfred Jenkins, Hermann Kern, John Buxton Knight, Edward Ladell, John Lavery, H. Lewis,. James Thomas Linnell, Arthur Lowe, Lowes Dalbiac Luard, Ernest Stephen Lumsden, Bernard Meninsky, Henry Moore, Paul Nash, Patrick Nasmyth, John Nesbitt, Albert Julius Olsson, Henry Perlee Parker, Emily Murray Paterson, John Pearson, William Bruce Ellis Ranken, John Nicholas Rhodes, Pieter Rijs, Robert Ernest Roe, Felix Schlesinger, Wilhelm Heinrich Schlesinger, Marck Senior, William Shackleton, Walter Sickert, Joseph Silcock, Frank Spenlove-Spenlove, George Blackie Sticks Joseph Thors, Charles Towne, Franz Richard Unterberger, Hendrik Verschuring, Edward Wadsworth, George Frederic Watts, William John Seward Webber, William Tatton Winter, Christopher Wood, and Philips Wouwerman.

== Gallery building ==
=== History ===
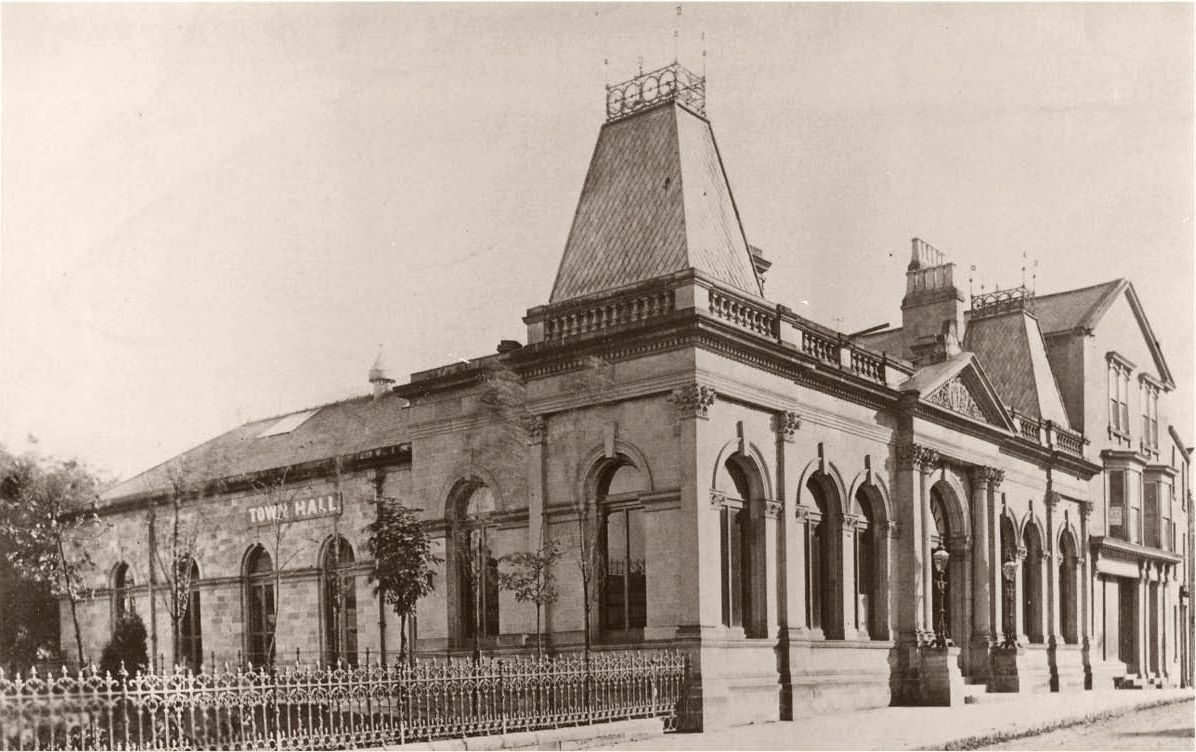
The Old Town Hall, in 1890

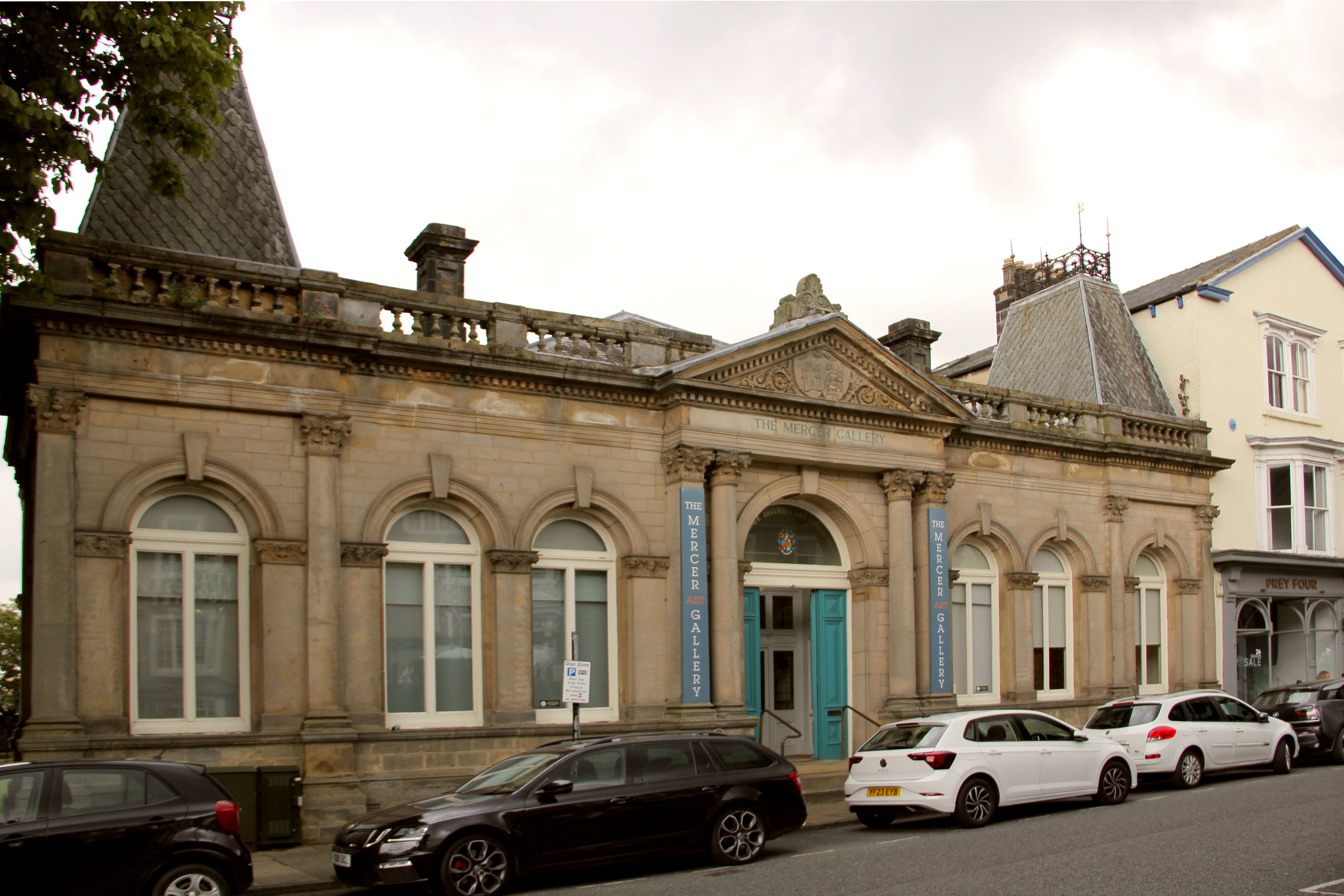
Western façade, in 2024

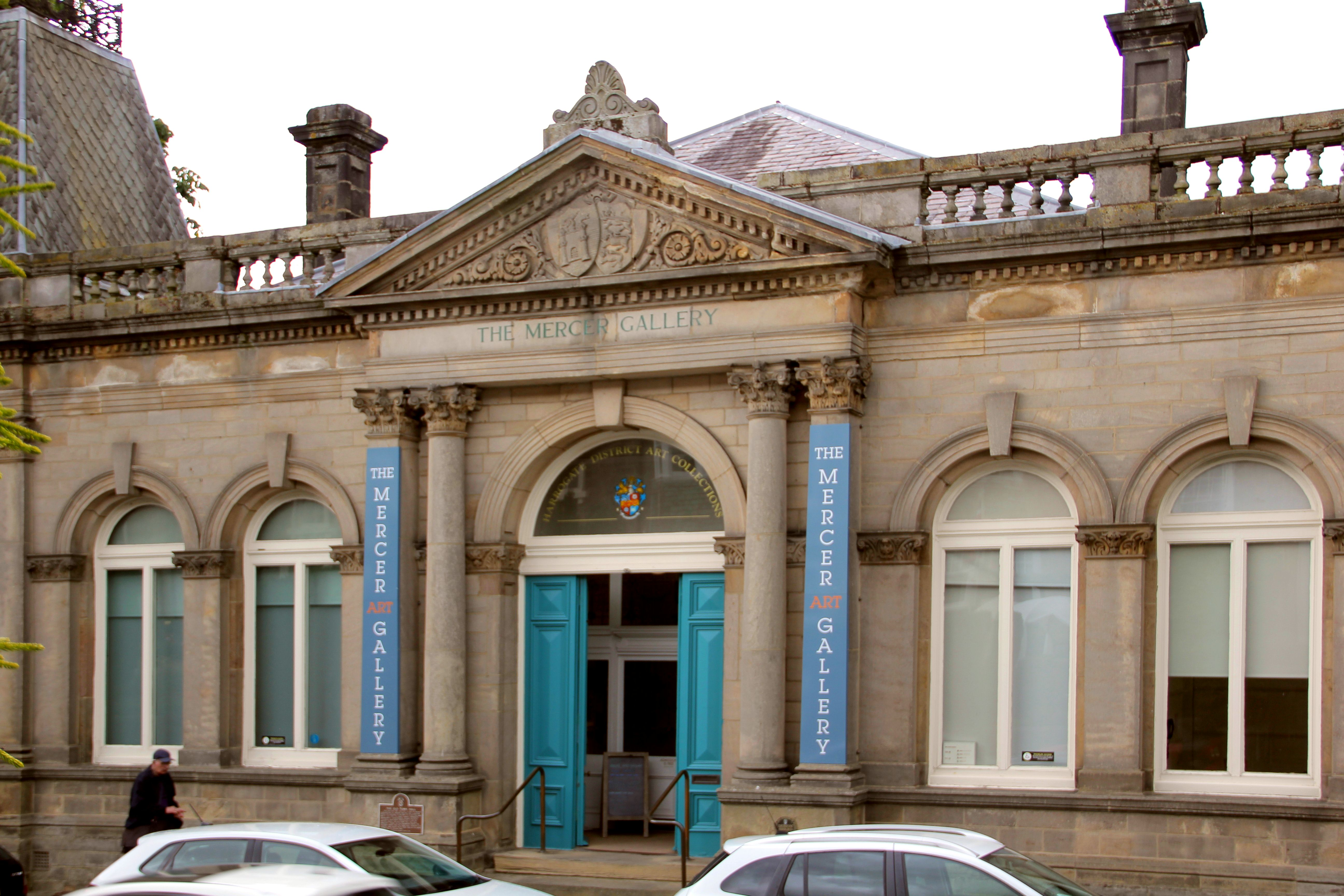
Portico, in 2024

The building was originally designed as the Promenade Rooms. According to historian Malcolm Neesam, "it was paid for by a group of doctors who realised that if patients extended their visits at Harrogate to enjoy the entertainments provided, the medical profession would surely benefit".

Since its days as the Promenade Rooms, the building has been known variously as the Victoria Reading Rooms and library (from 1839). the Assembly Rooms, the Old Town Hall, the Old Town Hall Theatre (1882–1990), and the Mercer Gallery (from 1991). At one point it was the housing benefits office.

The Harrogate Amateur Minstrels set up a theatre in the Old Town Hall in 1882. Oscar Wilde and Lily Langtree appeared there. The theatre continued until 1900, when the Grand Opera House superseded it in High Harrogate. Between 1900 and 1991, the building was subject to various uses by Harrogate Council, for example the spa's Mechano-Therapeutic Department, and later the office of the borough treasurer.

From 1991, the building has been inhabited by the Mercer Art Gallery. In 2011, during the gallery's 20th anniversary, the building underwent refurbishment and redecoration. It now has two main spaces for exhibitions: the main gallery in the old hall, and the north gallery, which is actually in the north-west wing. Because the land slopes downwards from the west front of the building to the eastern back end of the hall, there is storage space under the hall and under the adjoining old house. In 1991 the hall's basement space was offered by Harrogate Council for use as a restaurant, but that tenancy no longer exists.

=== Structure ===
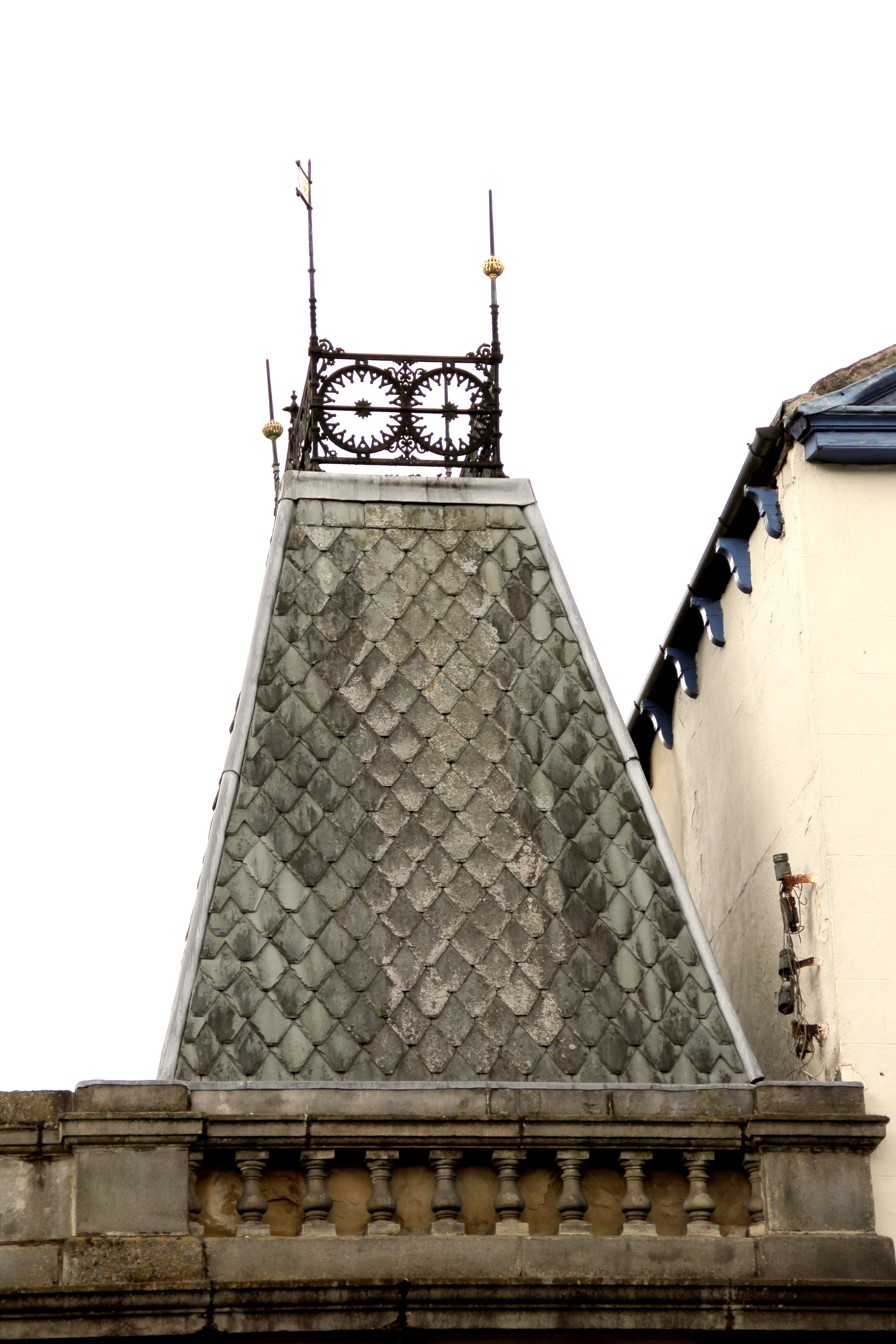
Roof pavilion, in 2024

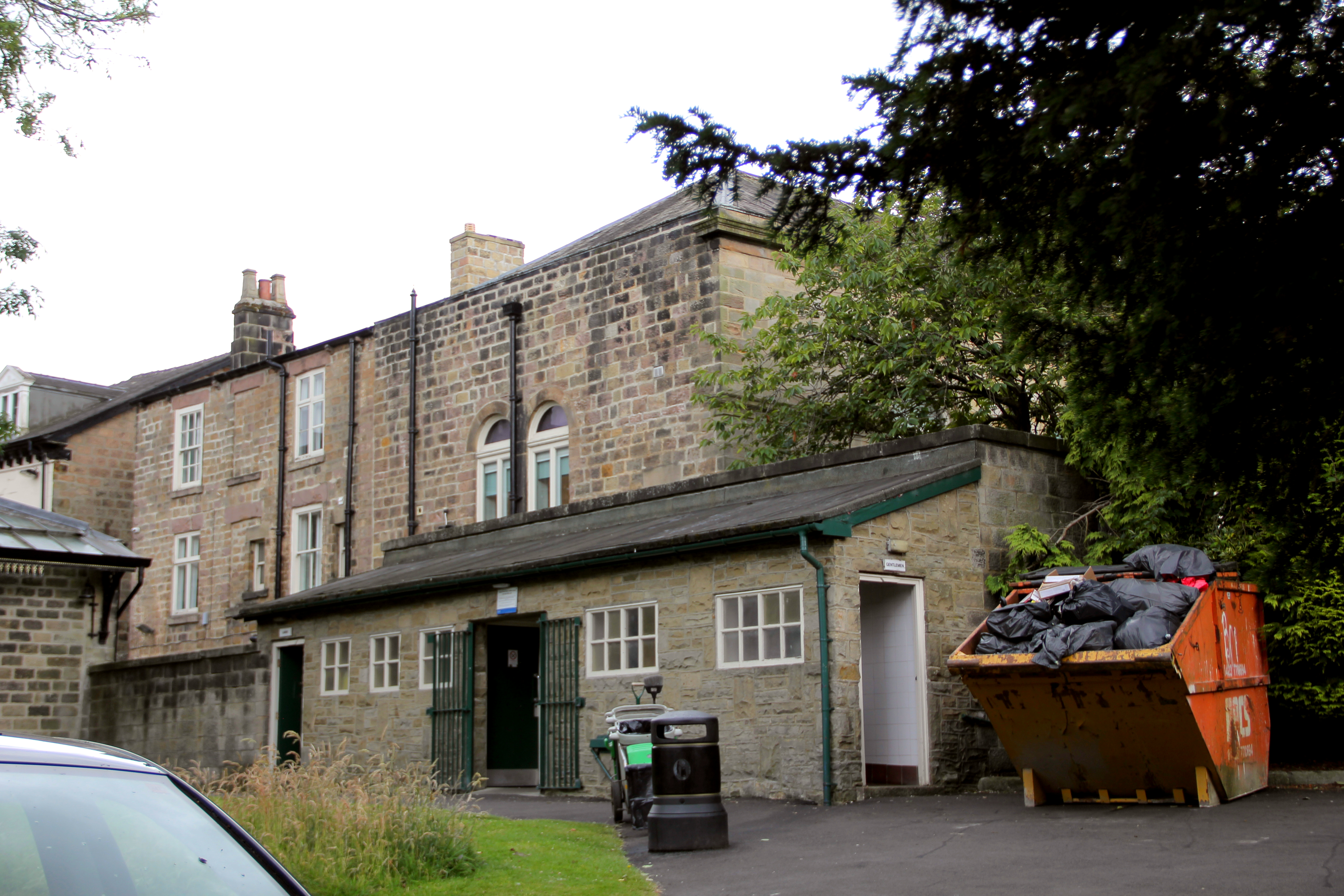
East end of the building, in 2024

This is a Grade II listed building. The building has a "handsome Italian Renaissance stone frontage", a symmetrical arrangement of five bays with round-arched windows and a projecting entrance bay in the centre. The entrance is a Corinthian portico, with a tympanum above, carrying the borough arms, and the doorway has a fanlight within its arch. This western façade on Swan Road was added, along with a general rebuild, between 1874 and 1876 by architect Arthur Hiscoe. (Note: English Heritage incorrectly names the 1870s architect of the rebuild of the Mercer Art Gallery as J. Hiscox.) The entrance is "flanked by attached columns and a handsome entablature enriched with symbols of the locality". It has a slated, hipped roof and a parapet with balustrades. Two high pavilions, "with steep ashlar fishtail slate roofs of French type with ornamental cast iron crestings", were designed by Hiscoe. The pavilions have "Corinthian pilasters carrying continuous entablature". Incorporated with the back of the building, and forming a south-east wing attached to the back of the main hall, is an old, three-storey house. It dates from the early 19th-century, and is constructed of squared, coursed gritstone rubble, with three sash windows and a door.

Hiscoe's interior refurbishment included an internal hall with coffered ceiling, and two new rooms either side of the front door. English Heritage now describes the hall as a "5-bay assembly room with coved cornice and arched windows"; the coffered ceiling is now gone.

== See also ==
- Listed buildings in Harrogate (Low Harrogate Ward)
