= David Bates (English artist) =

English artist

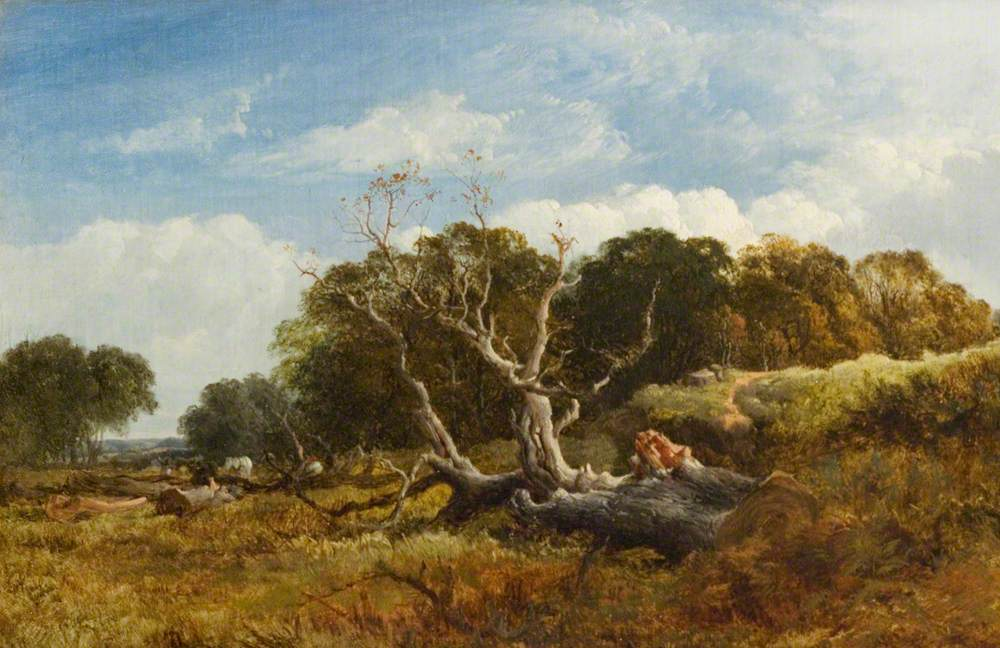
The Fallen Tree (1860)

David Bates (1840 – 1921) was an English landscape artist who painted in oils and watercolour.

Bates was born in Cambridge and from 1855 worked as a porcelain painter at the Royal Worcester porcelain works in Worcester - where he came to specialise in painting flowers. He left his employment there in 1880 to become a full-time professional painter.

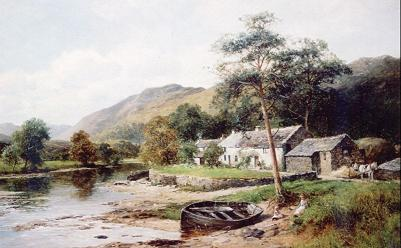
At the head of Derwent Water (1898)

Bates was an "open-air" rural landscape artist, painting in the Midlands, Scotland and Wales, and abroad in Switzerland and Egypt. His work shows the influence of Benjamin Williams Leader, Joseph Thors and Samuel Henry Baker, and Bates is associated in style with the Birmingham School of artists.

Bates exhibited many works at the Royal Academy, Grosvenor Gallery, Royal Society of British Artists and the New Watercolour Society in London, and at the Royal Birmingham Society of Artists. His works are currently on display in Liverpool museum, Worcester City Art Gallery & Museum, and several other art galleries.

His son, John Noel Bates (fl. 1870–1927), who adopted the professional name John Bates Noel, was also a notable landscape painter.

== Notes ==
One source indicates his date of birth may be 1843.
