= Victorian Turkish baths, Harrogate =

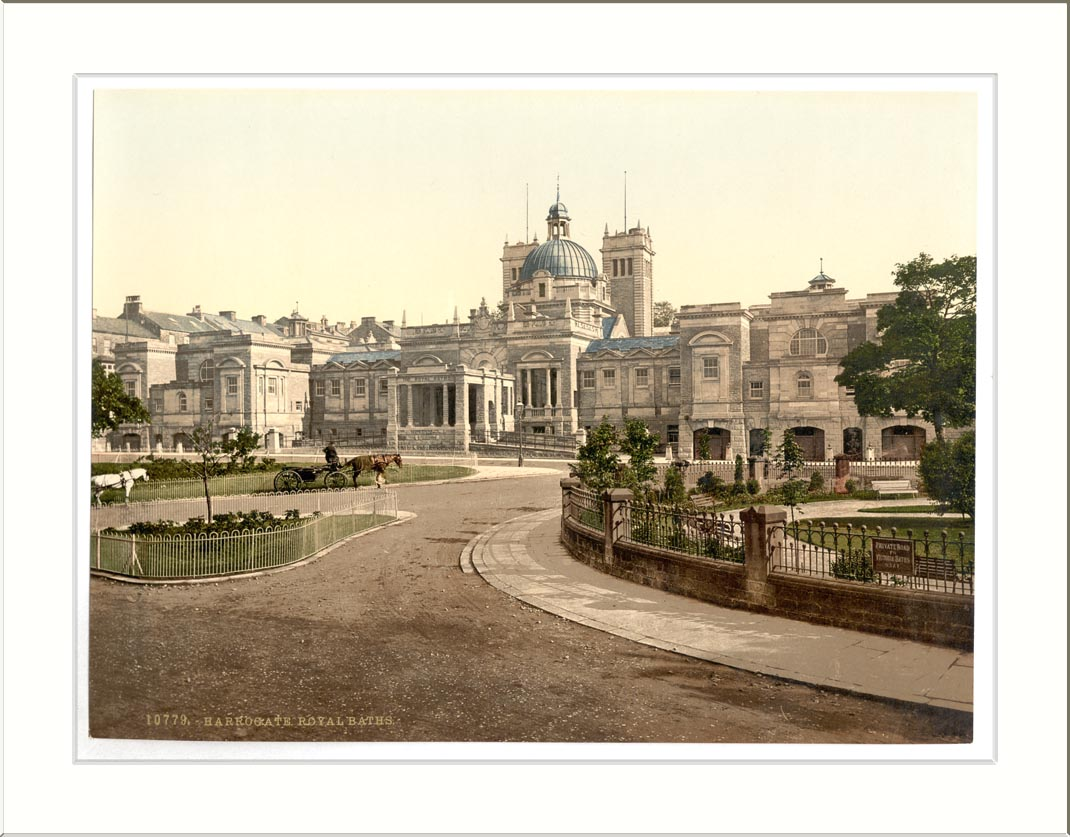
Original entrance to the Turkish baths was through the Royal Baths, Crescent Road

The Victorian Turkish baths in Parliament Street, Harrogate, England, opened in 1897 as part of the Royal Baths, and with their entrance originally in Crescent Road. The baths replaced those which had been added to the "Montpelier Gardens Baths" some time in the late 1870s. The new Turkish baths are still open, but the remaining parts of the Royal Baths are now used for other purposes. After major refurbishment at the beginning of the twenty-first-century, these baths are generally considered to be the most historically complete fully operational Victorian Turkish baths still in use.

== Background ==
Harrogate became England's first spa when a mineral water well was discovered in 1571, yet until the 1841 Harrogate Improvement Act, it remained 'undeveloped, semi-rural and informal'. Between the act and the town's incorporation in 1884, the town and its spa facilities developed rapidly.

In 1878, when the Old Swan Hotel was converted into "The Harrogate Hydro", it included the town's first Victorian Turkish bath. Other hydros and hotels quickly followed suit, but the Improvement Commissioners omitted them from their 1871 "Victoria Baths", the largest in the town. In 1877 there was a proposal that its under-used swimming pool be converted into Turkish baths, but this was unsuccessful. The Improvement Commissioners finally approved the town's Corporation installing them in the Montpelier Baths towards the end of the 1870, though they were soon closed for alterations.

By the mid-1880s the Corporation found that its baths were not keeping up with the growing competition and in 1887 they sent its Surveyor across the Channel to find out what facilities were being provided by some of the major spas in Europe. As a result they decided to build a completely new baths establishment, to be called the Royal Baths, and held an international competition adjudicated by the well-known Leeds-based Scottish architect, George Corson.

The competition was won by Messrs Baggallay and Bristowe of London, beating twenty-five other competitors. The new baths, with a few economy instigated omissions, were to be built on a site still occupied by existing baths, including the Turkish baths within the Corporation's Montpelier Gardens site. So the Montpellier Baths were demolished in two stages, the original Turkish baths remaining in operation until the new ones were ready for use. The foundation stone of the Royal Baths was laid by the Mayor, Charles Fortune on 25 April 1894, with much ceremony. The Baths cost around £120,000 and were officially opened by HRH the Duke of Cambridge on 23 July 1897.

== The Turkish baths ==
Shortly after the baths opened, Cyril Baggallay described his company's design in a lecture on 15 September at the Sanitary Congress, Leeds. His description of the Turkish baths was a masterpiece of understatement:

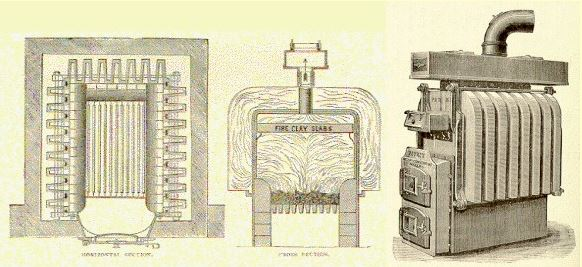
Three views of Crumblehulme's Convoluted Stove, also labelled Whitaker's or, most often, Constantine's Convoluted stove.

The south-east corner of the site is occupied by a Turkish bath, about which I do not know that there is much I could say to interest you, unless I were to describe the oriental appointments and decoration, which are rather more luxurious than is quite usual. It accommodates about twenty-two persons, and care has been taken to provide a good supply of fresh air, which is heated in a Crumblehulme's furnace. (Note: William Crumblehulme's works in Bolton manufactured the Convoluted Stove, virtually the nineteenth-century industry standard for heating Victorian Turkish baths. It was designed and patented by two bath owners who also lived in Bolton. The stove is most commonly labelled as Constantine's Convoluted Stove after hydropathist and Manchester baths owner, Joseph Constantine. It can also be labelled Whitaker's Convoluted Stove after its co-inventor Thomas Whitaker who owned the Turkish baths in Higher Bridge Street, Bolton.) There is also a good cold plunge. The hot rooms, lavatories, and so on, are lined with coloured glazed bricks. On the south-west is a series of special rooms, an inhalation room where people can sit about and read, or amuse themselves while inhaling the vapour, produced by a hot, mineral water fountain; a pulverisation room, fitted with little marble tables, on which are delicate instruments for spraying the eyes, nostrils, throat and ears; and a suite of massage rooms.

Pike's illustrated account of Harrogate, with no need for modesty, noted that the bathrooms in the Turkish baths 'are of solid glazed brickwork in beautiful tints and patterns' and that the floors were laid in oak parquet or 'in marble mosaic specially designed...'

The three hot rooms were maintained at temperatures of 120 °F (49 °C), 180 °F (82 °C), and 210 °F (99 °C). More than a dozen other types of bath, douche, or treatment were available, and bathers could drink from a range of different mineral waters.

The baths opened from 7.00 am till 8.00 pm on weekdays in the summer and for a shorter period in the winter. There were special times for women bathers and, unusually at the turn of the century, the baths were open on Sunday mornings. Also unusual was that while the cost of a bath from November to May was 3/- (6d more than at the old Montpellier Baths), it was raised to 3/6 from June to October. Massage charges varied according to their duration: 2/- for the first fifteen minutes, and 1/6 for each additional quarter of an hour.

The general procedure for taking a Turkish bath at the Royal Baths was little different from that in any other first class establishment, though there was rather more personal attention than one would expect to receive in Turkish baths today: wet shoes would be placed to dry if it was raining outside; towels would be spread on a seat in the first hot room after a bather's initial shower; tumblers of water would be brought; bathers would be called and taken to the shampooing area at the appropriate time; and an attendant could be summoned by a clap of the hands if anything else was needed.

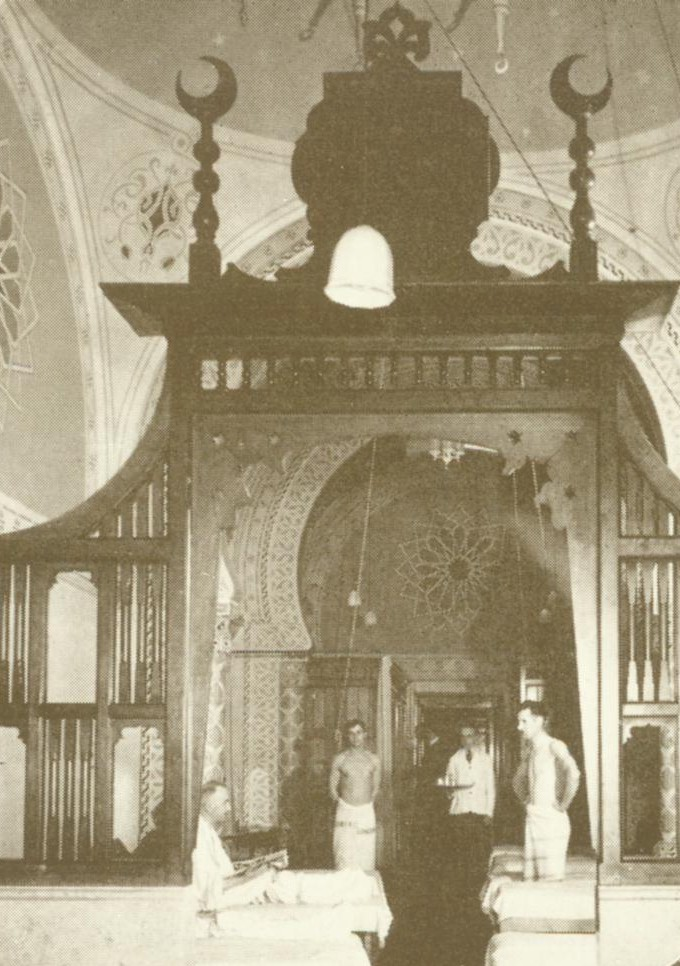
Cooling-room, c.1894

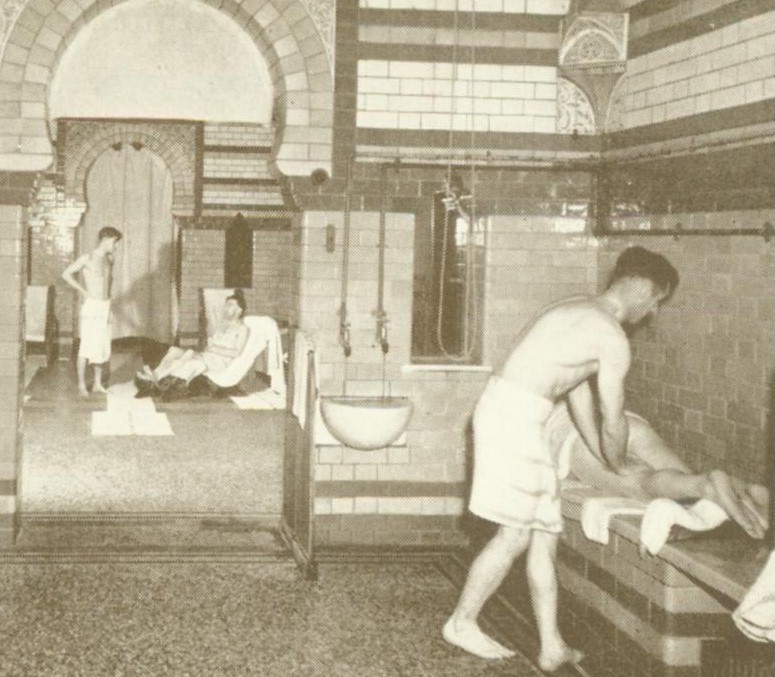
Massage and hot room c.1894

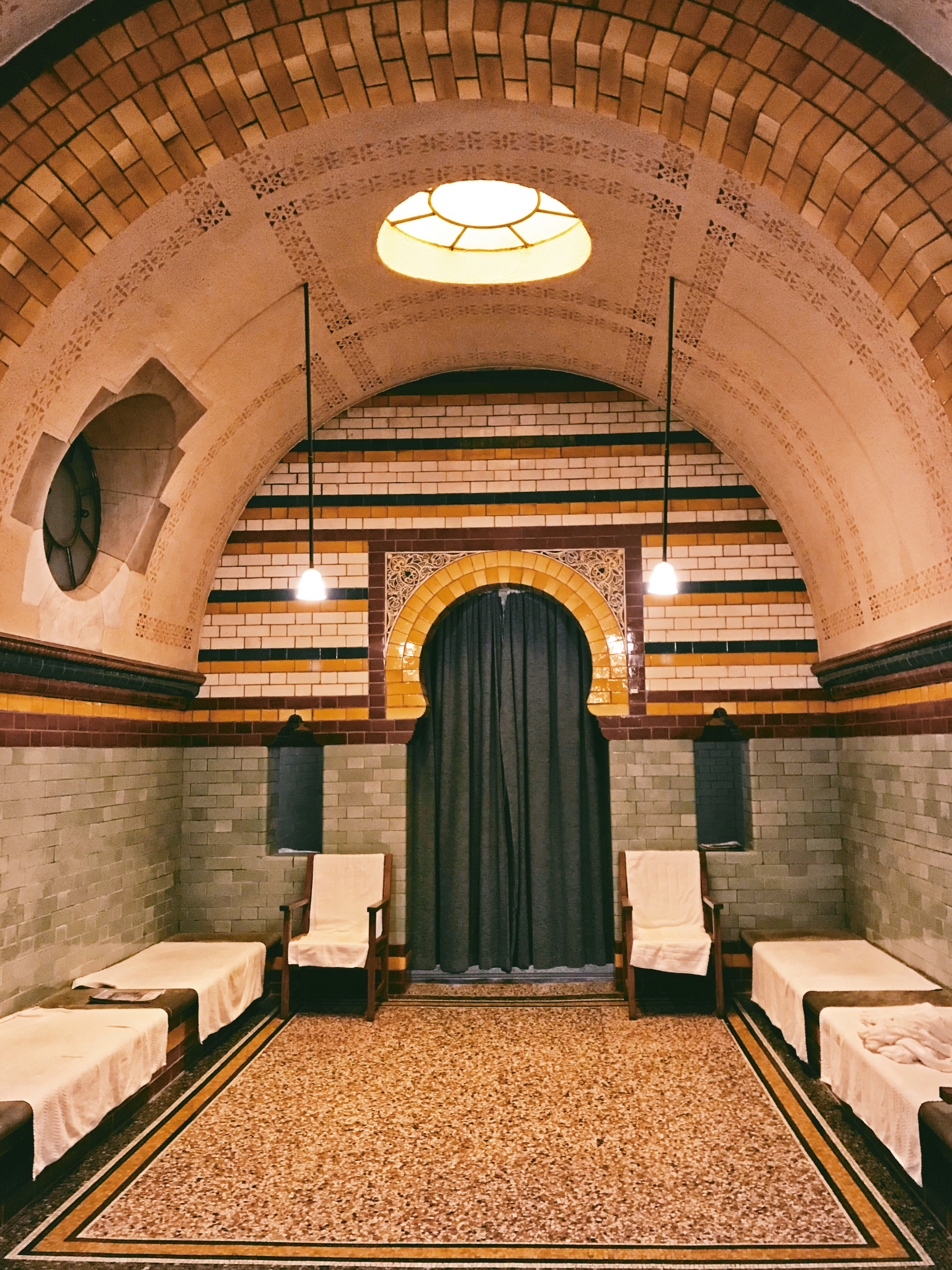
One of the hot rooms, 2018

In 1948 all voluntary hospitals, including those at spas, were brought into the NHS, even when, as at Harrogate, treatment was also provided for patients outside the immediate area. This resulted in the number of private patients falling considerably as costs were now borne by the health service. When in the late 1960s the NHS terminated its contract with the Royal Baths, an attempt was made to relaunch its services as a private facility. But this failed after only a year and, with the exception of the Turkish baths, the Royal Baths closed in 1969.

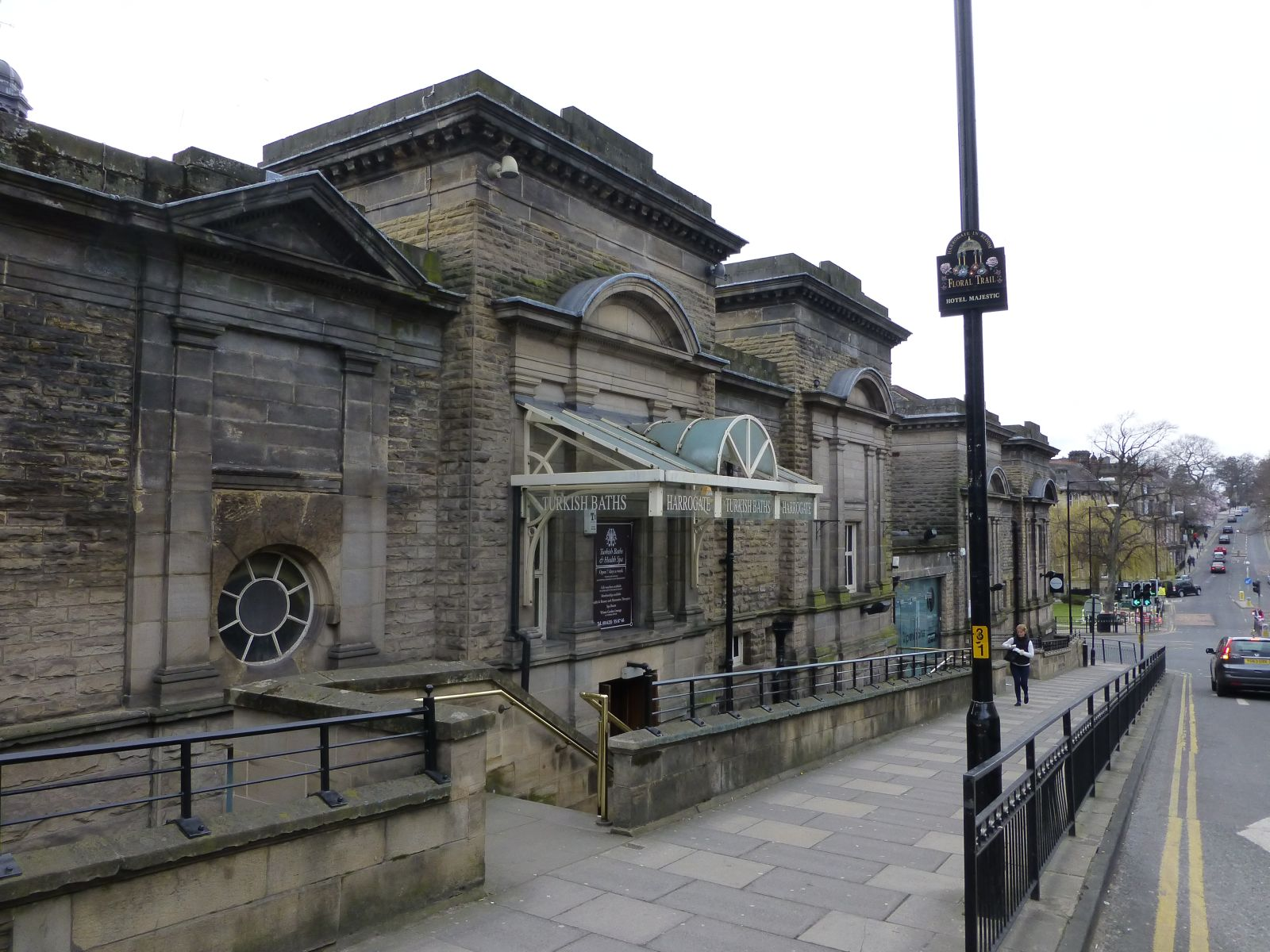
New entrance to Harrogate's Victorian Turkish Baths, 2002

Soon after the centenary of the Turkish baths, plans were made to undertake a major refurbishment as part of a general refurbishment of the Royal Baths building and its services. The first stage was completed on 4 March 2002 and included creating a new entrance to the Turkish baths off Parliament Street, adding seven treatment rooms, a spa room and a lift to the first floor. A covered atrium was also created from a previously unused courtyard which now provides an area where bathers can obtain light refreshments. It also provides a link between the treatment rooms, which can now be accessed without disturbing people using the Turkish baths.

The second stage of the programme, involving the restoration, to its original state of decoration, of the interior of the Turkish bath area itself, was completed during the latter part of 2003 and the first half of 2004.
