= John Buxton Knight =

English painter (1843–1908)

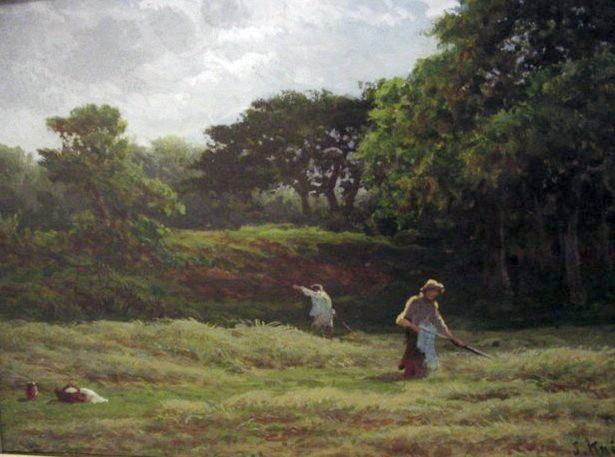
Gathering Hay (1893)

John William Buxton Knight RBA (1843 – 2 January 1908), English landscape painter, was born in Sevenoaks, Kent.

Originally a schoolmaster, he later became a painter by trade. In 1861 he had his first picture hung at the Royal Academy. He was primarily an open-air painter, and often went on sketching tours in England. He died at Dover on 2 January 1908.

The Chantrey trustees bought Knight's "December's Bareness Everywhere" for the nation in February 1908. Many of his pictures had passed into the collection of Mr Iceton of Putney (including "White Walls of Old England" and "Hereford Cathedral"), Mr Walter Briggs of Burley in Wharfedale (especially "Pinner"), and Mr SM Phillips of Wrotham (especially two watercolours of Richmond Bridge).

John William Buxton Knight was an English landscape painter who was seen as unconventional and spirited.

Born in Sevenoaks, Kent to William Knight (1810 – 1878; artist and teacher of art), ‘Buxton Knight’ began his art studies at an early age, although not in any formal and systematic manner, but by working in the open air and observing nature. Knole Park in Sevenoaks was popular with many notable artists, who Buxton Knight made acquaintance with, helping inform his future path that included: "a high position amongst the great exponents of English landscape…. which Constable and Crome would have been the first to recognise."

At the age of 22 Buxton Knight went as a student into the Academy schools on the advice of Sir Edwin Henry Landseer, and was there for two years. Prior to these formal studies he was already an exhibiting painter, having contributed his first canvas to the Academy at the age of 18 in 1861. He continued to exhibit at the Academy throughout his career and until the end of his life, with a total of 72 paintings. His last exhibition was in 1907 and subsequent to his death the following year, one of his two paintings exhibited in 1907, Old December Bareness Everywhere, was acquired by the Chantrey Bequest and bequeathed to the Tate for the benefit of the Nation.

Despite exhibiting such a large number of paintings at the Royal Academy throughout his lifetime, Buxton Knight was never admitted as an Associate or an Academician, despite having been put forward numerous times. A year after his death, E Barrington Nash wrote: "I am informed that Mr Knight’s name has lately been placed upon the list of candidates for the Royal Academy Associateship, but surely, with such great masterly works as ‘Dover’, ‘White Walls’, ‘Littlehampton’, ‘Hop-picking’, ‘Poole’, ‘Richmond Park’, (White Lodge), and many others en evidence before us, it is a matter of national disgrace that he has not been admitted a full-fledged R.A. long ago."

He was thought of as a great and varied landscape painter. He was also known for living a largely nomadic lifestyle where he painted what he saw in nature.

Within Sir Alfred Munnings's autobiography there is a story of a bet that he had with the Director of Leeds City Art Gallery, whether Buxton Knight had painted ‘Ingleborough Hall, Yorkshire’ in the open air. Munnings spoke to a retired postman in the neighbouring village of Clapham, Yorkshire, who confirmed that he passed Buxton Knight daily, painting outside. The postman once took Buxton Knight a letter, which he opened there, saying it brought him bad news as the Royal Academy had not elected him as Associate. Munnings comments that it was "a story of the dashed hopes of one of our finest landscape-painters; a story reflecting little credit upon members of the Academy."

Within Ann Galbally's book "A Remarkable Friendship – Vincent Van Gogh and John Peter Russell", there is mention that "…Buxton Knight another friend of Russell and [Tom] Roberts, and known to Edward Combes, became something of a mentor to Roberts, Russell and other visiting Australian students, including E Phillips Fox. An interpreter of the cool, tonal landscape, tranquil and slightly melancholy at times, with a preference for autumnal scenes and twilight tones.... he became a foundation member of the New English Art Club in 1888. Combes nominated him for membership of the Art Society of New South Wales, where he exhibited in 1882 and 1883, years that Combes was president. One of his March 1883 exhibits, ‘Halcyon Days by Murmuring Stream’ was acquired by the Art Gallery of New South Wales, along with another, ‘Deserted’, when Combes was President of Trustees. Knight returned the compliment by painting and exhibiting at the Royal Academy ‘La Peruse, Botany Bay. After Edward Combes’. Knight kept in touch with Russell during his Paris years and with Roberts when he returned to Melbourne, even becoming the subject of a request for an introduction from Roberts by the young Charles Conder in 1890."

An obituary in the Examiner on 15 February 1908 remarked of Buxton Knight’s passing as follows: "Death of a great artist. One of the greatest modern British landscape painters passed away recently, though his death and the loss caused by it to the art of his country have remained practically unnoticed. There are many connoisseurs who hold the late Mr Buxton Knight to be the equal, if not the superior, of the very leaders of modern landscape painting in Great Britain, though his work, like that of Arthur Melville or J Charles, was not very well known to the large public while the artist himself was still among the living. Mr Buxton Knight, who first exhibited at the Royal Academy in 1861, excelled chiefly in his strong virile oil paintings of the English countryside, which were always remarkable for their firmness of handling and the sense of structure, of the solidity, of all objects."

Within a review of an "Art Exhibition of English Paintings" on 2 January 1928, the quality of Buxton Knight was pronounced when describing an exhibited painting of his: "The character of ‘Near Chertsey’, by the late J Buxton Knight, is best described by saying that we should like to see it hung between a Constable and a Sisley – with a Monet to complete the sequence – as marking a definite stage in the logical development of Impressionism."

== Galleries and Collections of J W Buxton Knight's Paintings ==
Art Gallery of Ballarat, Victoria

Art Gallery NSW, Sydney

Atkinson Art Gallery Collection

Bolton Museum and Art Gallery

Bradford Museums & Gallery

Burton Art Gallery & Museum

Bury Art Museum

Cartwright Hall Art Gallery

Craven Museum & Gallery

Dublin City Gallery

Gallery Oldham

Hackney Museum

Kirklees Museums & Galleries

Laing Art Gallery

Leeds Art Gallery

Manchester Art Gallery

Museu de Arte do Rio Grande do Sul, Brazil

Museums Sheffield

National Gallery Victoria, Melbourne

National Trust, Standen

Southampton City Art Gallery

Stockport Heritage Services

Tate

The Mercer Art Gallery

Towner

UCL Art Museum

Art Gallery of South Australia, Adelaide
