= William Tatton Winter =

Landscape with Trees, River and Boatman, watercolour, Victoria and Albert Museum

The Marsh Mill, 1901, oil on canvas, Mercer Art Gallery

William Tatton Winter (1855-1928) was an English landscape artist, mostly in watercolour but also in oils and printmaking. He generally signed his work Tatton Winter, and was often known as this. He was a prolific and well known painter in the decades either side of 1900. Though his paintings show a variety of landscape subjects, many show a style he developed of windswept scenes on heaths or commons, often with small travelling figures, leafless trees, sheep and often a windmill. These are reminiscent of the landscapes of Corot, if with rather worse weather.

Born in Lancashire, he was based in Surrey in later life. His surname at birth was Winterbottom, which he shortened to Winter at the start of his career, to avoid confusion with another northern artist. He usually signs his paintings, but typically they are not dated, though when there is a date it is often after 1900. He also sometimes used a studio stamp, both on prints and paintings.

Landscape with Windmill

He exhibited frequently at the Royal Academy, with 32 paintings, in 20 of their exhibitions between 1891 and 1925. He also exhibited 294 works at the Royal Society of British Artists ("RBA"), to which he was elected in 1896, 43 at the Royal Institute of Painters in Water Colours ("RI"), and 274 at the Walker Art Gallery in Liverpool, as well as the Paris Salon, in Munich and other venues.

He also produced print versions of some paintings (all were probably based on original paintings), which after 1900 were usually in colour. As well as scenes in his familiar landscape style, some were more conventional townscapes, with sets of views of the famous cathedral cities of Canterbury, Winchester and Salisbury.

== Life ==
He was one of six Winterbottom children born in Ashton-under-Lyne, Lancashire (now in Greater Manchester). His childhood was far from uneventful. A nurse abducted him and he was only rescued as the pair were about to board a ship for Australia at Liverpool. His father had family connections with America and went there in the 1860s, and was killed fighting for the Union side in the American Civil War. It was then a struggle for his mother to raise and educate her children, which she did by owning a second-hand clothing shop or stall in the Market Hall in Ashton.

William left school early and worked at various jobs, but was always keen to develop his art, which some employers helped and encouraged him to do. He took evening classes at the Manchester Academy. When Ford Madox Brown was painting in The Manchester Murals in Manchester Town Hall, which he began in 1879, he gave Winter advice and encouragement, and Winter was able to meet John Ruskin and William Holman Hunt. Eventually he was able to travel to the Continent and study at the Antwerp Academy under the Belgian painter Charles Verlat (some years before Vincent van Gogh's brief and fractious period there in 1886).

He lived in Harpur Hill, in Derbyshire but not far from Manchester, and seems to have formed his windswept landscape style there. He first visited Carshalton in Surrey in 1883; it was then a rural village, but with an easy railway connection to London. He settled there and remained for 15 years, before moving to Reigate in 1897, where he lived until his death. He married Edith Constance Fox in 1886, and they had five children.

One son, Cecil Tatton-Winter (1895-1954) was an architect and amateur artist, remaining in Reigate, where he is buried next to his parents in Reigate Cemetery.

== Paintings ==
He exhibited in England from 1884, and his windswept landscape style was attractive to critics and buyers, so in 1895 the Daily News praised his "expressive transcripts of rainy and windy weather in the country" In 1898 the Ipswich Journal described him as a "member of the impressionist school" in reviewing two of his paintings in an exhibition there. It is often said that Queen Victoria boosted his career by buying one or more paintings at his first showing at the RBA, but the only work of his now recorded by the Royal Collection is the miniature for the Doll's House, discussed below. Other paintings may have been given as presents.

Print of Stonehenge, from the Salisbury set, 1920s

A one-man show at the Continental Gallery in London in 1902 was given a good review in The Pall Mall Gazette. It included views of Bruges and Brittany, these "tasteful as well as vivid", as well as, predominantly, Surrey, described as "sympathetic, intimate and beautiful". They were critical of some of his small figures, and noted that at any distance above a yard away his oils were hard to distinguish from watercolours or pastels. In 1925 The Connoisseur praised his "attractive atmospheric style and delicate perception of colour, typically French in feeling with a faint suggestion of Watteau and Corot."

He was one of the artists invited to contribute to Queen Mary's Dolls' House around 1923, and Windmill against yellow sky, a 1.5 inch x 1 inch watercolour picture of the Reigate Heath Windmill (already out of use as a windmill, a very common subject of Winter's), remains in the Royal Collection in the library of the doll's house.

He bequeathed at least 14 paintings of the Reigate area to the local council, now Reigate and Banstead Borough Council; some are hung in the town hall, and reproductions can be bought. Adrian Vincent noted that "his work has tended to be underestimated", and he is rather thinly represented in museum collections. The supposed national collection of watercolours in the Victoria and Albert Museum has only a single example, and the British Museum has neither paintings nor prints.

== Printmaking ==
Print, 1920s

Winter produced a number of prints in colour, described at the time by terms such as "coloured engraving" or "coloured etching", but more strictly they are aquatints, mezzotints or colour lithographs. The colour was always printed; the age of hand-colouring was over. Some of these reproduced typical bleak heath scenes, but others were more conventional townscape views, with rather sunnier weather; he also painted such views in watercolour. In the style of the time, they were signed in the plate, and below the image in pencil, but not numbered; some were also blind stamped. Some, especially those printed posthumously, are signed in pencil by "Dr David Donald", who created the printing plates from Winter's paintings. He was a surgeon as well as a printmaker who produced prints of his own compositions, especially of North African scenes. A set of 15 views of Canterbury was published by "The Museum Galleries" in 55 Short's Gardens, Drury Lane, London in December 1927. This was a gallery that sold many of his watercolours also in the 1920s, and gave him a one-man show in 1923; they were active from 1922 to 1929, and also published colour mezzotints of portraits, some decades old, of many distinguished Victorians.

A further set of 11 views in and around Salisbury was produced by the Museum Galleries, including one of Stonehenge. A set of 8 of Winchester, was advertised in 1930, by which point Winter was dead. There were also prints of Continental cities; one of Tangier Harbour may be the most distant from his usual beat.

Prints

Salisbury Cathedral from across the river - a famous view painted by John Constable and others

Salisbury Market, with the portico of the Salisbury Guildhall

The Square, Winchester, looking north-ish

The Cross, Winchester - the "City Cross" or Buttercross

River View with Amesbury Church, near Salisbury

River with Cattle, 1927, from the Canterbury set?

Winchester, the City Bridge, on High Street/Bridge Street. The triangular-profile building behind it is the City Mill.

Prior's Gate, Winchester, seen from St Swithun Street
