= Eva Leigh (artist) =

English artist (1895–1981)

- Self-portrait of Eva Leigh, 1920s
- Born: Eva Mary Walker; 18 October 1895; Undercliffe, Bradford, West Yorkshire, England
- Died: 9 August 1981 (aged 85); Knaresborough, North Yorkshire, England
- Known for: Portrait drawings and silhouettes

Eva Mary Walker (18 October 1895 – 9 August 1981), known professionally as Eva Leigh, was an English portrait and silhouette artist in Harrogate, North Yorkshire. An exhibition of her portraits was shown at the Mercer Art Gallery, Harrogate, from May to September 2024, using examples of her work from the gallery's collection.

== Background ==
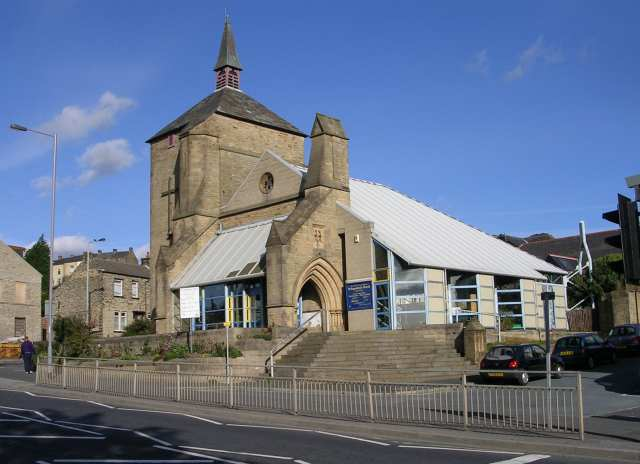
St Augustine's Church, where Leigh was baptised (now much altered)

Leigh was born into a working-class Anglican family based in the West Yorkshire industrial districts of Bradford and Leeds. Her paternal great grandfather was tobacconist Joseph Walker. (Note: Joseph Walker (born Holbeck circa 1796).) Her paternal grandfather James Walker was a drysalter, living in Woodhouse, Leeds. (Note: James Walker (Leeds 24 February 1839 – Leeds July 1902). GRO index:Deaths Sep 1902 Walker James 63 Leeds 9b 261.) In 1862, in Leeds, he married Mary Rebecca Leigh, the daughter of dentist Samuel George Leigh. (Note: Mary Rebecca Walker née Leigh (Oundle 22 October 1828 – Hunslet 1915). Leigh's paternal grandmother. GRO index: Marriages Jun 1862 Leigh Mary Rebecca Leeds 9b 358. Deaths Mar 1915 Walker Mary R. 86 Hunslet 9b 764.) The eldest of their five children was Samuel Leigh Walker.

Leigh was born in Bradford as Eva Mary Walker, (Note: Eva Mary Walker, aka Eva Leigh (Bradford 18 October 1895 – Harrogate 9 August 1981). GRO index: Births Dec 1895 Walker Eva Mary Bradford, Yorkshire 9b 43. Deaths Sep 1981 Walker, Eva Leigh - October 1897 Claro 2 1823.) the eldest child of Samuel Leigh Walker, (Note: Samuel Leigh Walker (Leeds 1863 – Bradford 17 January 1926) GRO index: Births Sep 1863 Walker Samuel Leigh Leeds 9b 413. Deaths Mar 1926 Walker Samuel L. 62 Bradford 9b 173.) a buyer for the woollen trade, and his wife Florence Ada Walker née Tennant. Walker and Tennant were married on 5 January 1895 at All Hallows Church, 24 Regent Terrace, Leeds. (Note: Florence Walker née Tennant (Leeds 1874 – Bradford 1935). GRO index: Births Mar 1874 Tennant Florence Ada Leeds 9b 521. Marriages Mar 1895 Tennant Florence Ada and Walker Samuel Leigh Leeds 9b 397. Deaths Dec 1935 Walker Florence A. 62 Bradford 9b 181.) Leigh was baptised at St Augustine's Church, Bradford, on 29 August 1900. She had three brothers named Richard Walter, Joseph Charles and Frederick Ernest, of whom Richard was a draughtsman in the aviation industry. As a child she lived in Undercliffe, in Wightman Street, near the Otley Road, Bradford. According to historian Fiona Young and the University of Bradford lecturer Colin Neville, she was trained at Bradford School of Art just before the First World War, and before she reached her 20th birthday. She never married, and died in 1981 at Scotton Banks Hospital, Harrogate, although her residence was still noted as The Studio, Grosvenor Buildings, Harrogate. She was cremated at Stonefall Cemetery, Harrogate. Since the rediscovery of the artist and some confusion over her name, Leigh has sometimes been called "Eva Leigh Walker".

== Career ==
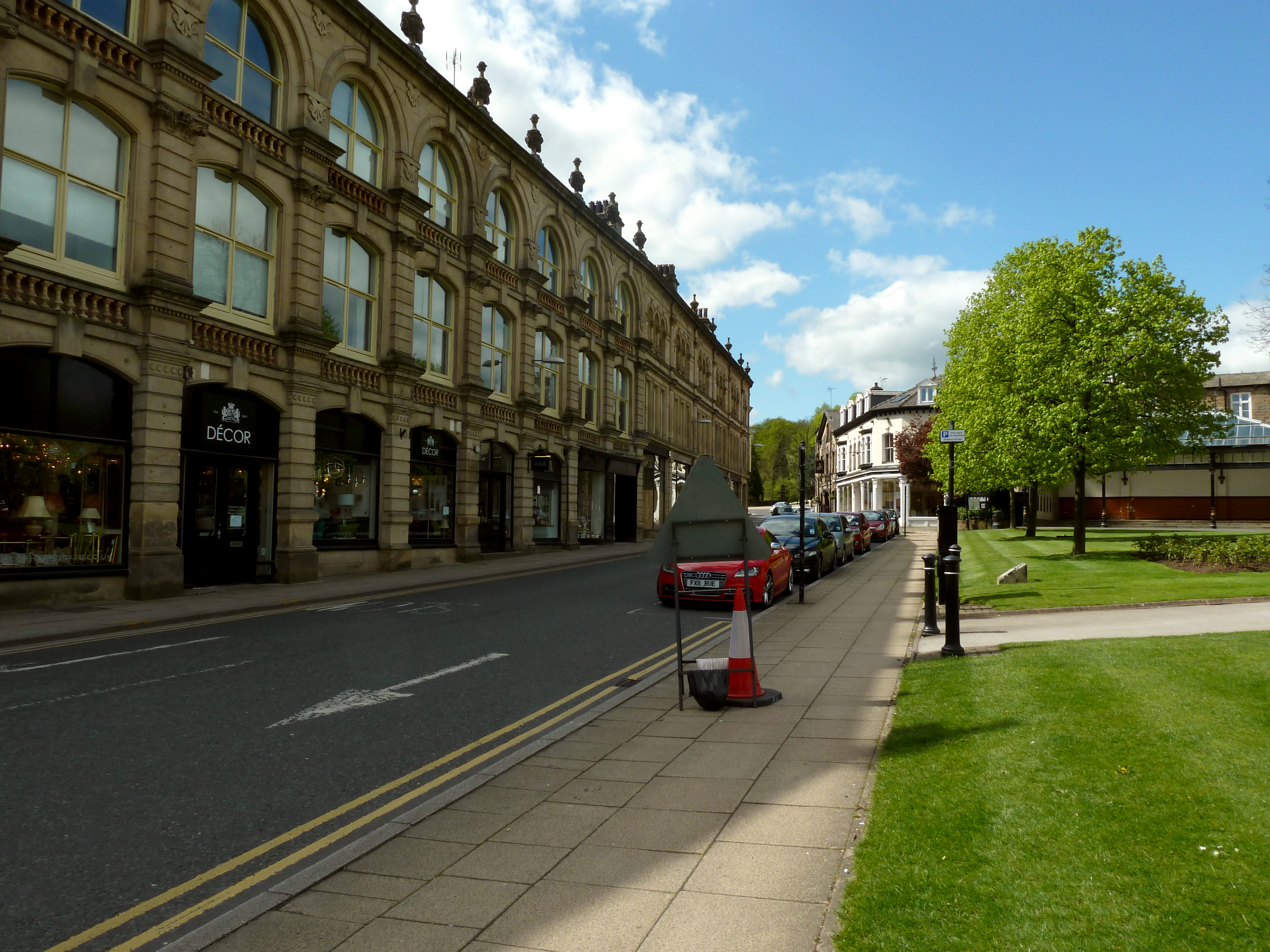
Crescent Road, Harrogate, the location of Leigh's studio

Throughout her 60-year career as an artist, Leigh used the maiden name of her paternal grandmother, Mary Rebecca Walker née Leigh. Leigh was a portrait and silhouette artist in Harrogate, North Yorkshire. The 1921 Census finds Leigh in Harrogate, describing herself as an artist. Her studio, a "tiny flat up many stairs ... cluttered and chaotic", named Silhouette, was located at 1 Grosvenor Buildings, in Crescent Road, Harrogate, above the Grosvenor Galleries. There she created portraits in the form of silhouettes, paintings, pastel and pencil. Her silhouettes were different from the traditional cut paper form; they were India ink drawings. According to Fiona Young, the silhouette work "was meticulous and demanding and [Leigh] was known to suffer from eye strain from time to time".

Although not starving in a garret, Leigh had "few financial reserves" according to her family, so she used cheap paper, and re-used it on occasion. According to Fiona Young, "her financial position was always somewhat precarious ... within her family she had the reputation for being permanently broke and was always borrowing money".

Contemporaneously with the artists Luigi Russolo, Piet Mondrian and Wassily Kandinsky, Leigh followed the Theosophy movement alongside her own lifelong interest in Hinduism and Buddhism. One of Leigh's portrait subjects was Hodgson Alfred Smith, (Note: Hodgson Alfred Smith (Stepney 1848 – Knaresborough 1935) GRO index: Births Jun 1848 Smith Hodgson Alfred Stepney II 530. Deaths Dec 1935 Smith Hodgson A. 87 Knaresbro' 9a 120. President of Harrogate Theosophy Lodge.) the president of Harrogate Theosophy Lodge, where Leigh was once invited to address a meeting. She had a Hindu teacher, Professor Hari Prasad Shastri who, according to Fiona Young, asked her to "start a circle for the study of oriental philosophy", and she was also interested in the paranormal, and "dabbled in astrology". The musician and artist of Yorkshire and Glasgow, Herbert Bannister Whone, (Note: Herbert Bannister Whone, born George Herbert Whone (Bingley 14 June 1925 – 16 May 2011), musician, painter and photographer. GRO index: Births Sep 1925 Whone George H. Mother, Stead. Keighley 9a 246. See: Not Just Hockney: Whone, Herbert Bannister and Inglis, Anne (3 August 2011). "Herbert Whone obituary". The Guardian..) collected her work during her later years. Whone shared with Young the challenge of spontaneous sketching, that is, the technique of sketching unaware sitters. Leigh once drew the entire Hallé Orchestra in that way.

Leigh's portrait commissions included Princess Victoria, sister of King George V. Colin Neville states that she also painted or silhouetted Caroline Ingilby of Ripley Castle and Sir John Barbirolli; On 27 September 2024 the Mercer Art Gallery posted on Instagram that Leigh had executed a work named Portrait of actor Jimmy Forbes. (Note: Portrait of Jimmy Forbes: This was possibly a portrait, in character, of the comedian and actor Richard Hearne, who played Jimmy Forbes in the 1936 film, Millions.) Fiona Young (2024) contains a reproduction of a portrait by Leigh of Kathleen Rutherford. Leigh's main customer base was the large number of visitors to the spa town of Harrogate, plus the town's residents and their children, whose "angelic faces are delicately captured in pastel and pencil", as described by Fiona Young. Besides the portraits, she created studies of trees, landscapes and flowers.

== Exhibitions ==
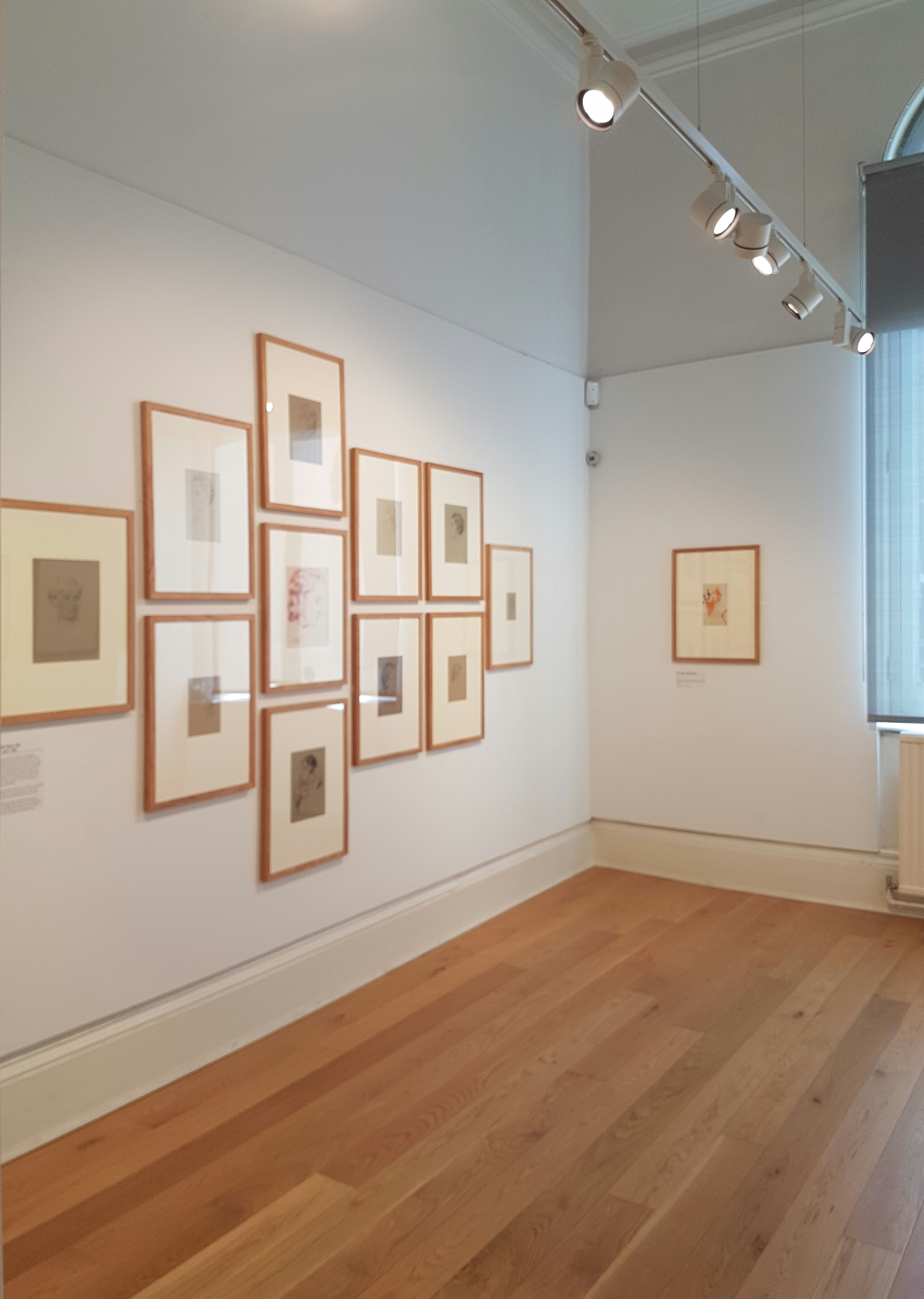
Part of the Mercer Gallery exhibition, 2024

An exhibition of Leigh's portraits was shown at the Mercer Art Gallery, Harrogate, from May to September 2024, using examples of her work from the gallery's collection, together with works by Leigh from the former collection of Herbert Bannister Whone. Colin Neville asserts that she also exhibited at the Royal Academy Summer Exhibitions on an unknown date. The art dealer Worthpoint has claimed that one of Leigh's 1920s framed silhouettes has the provenance of a museum exhibition label affixed to the back.

== Collections and rediscovery ==
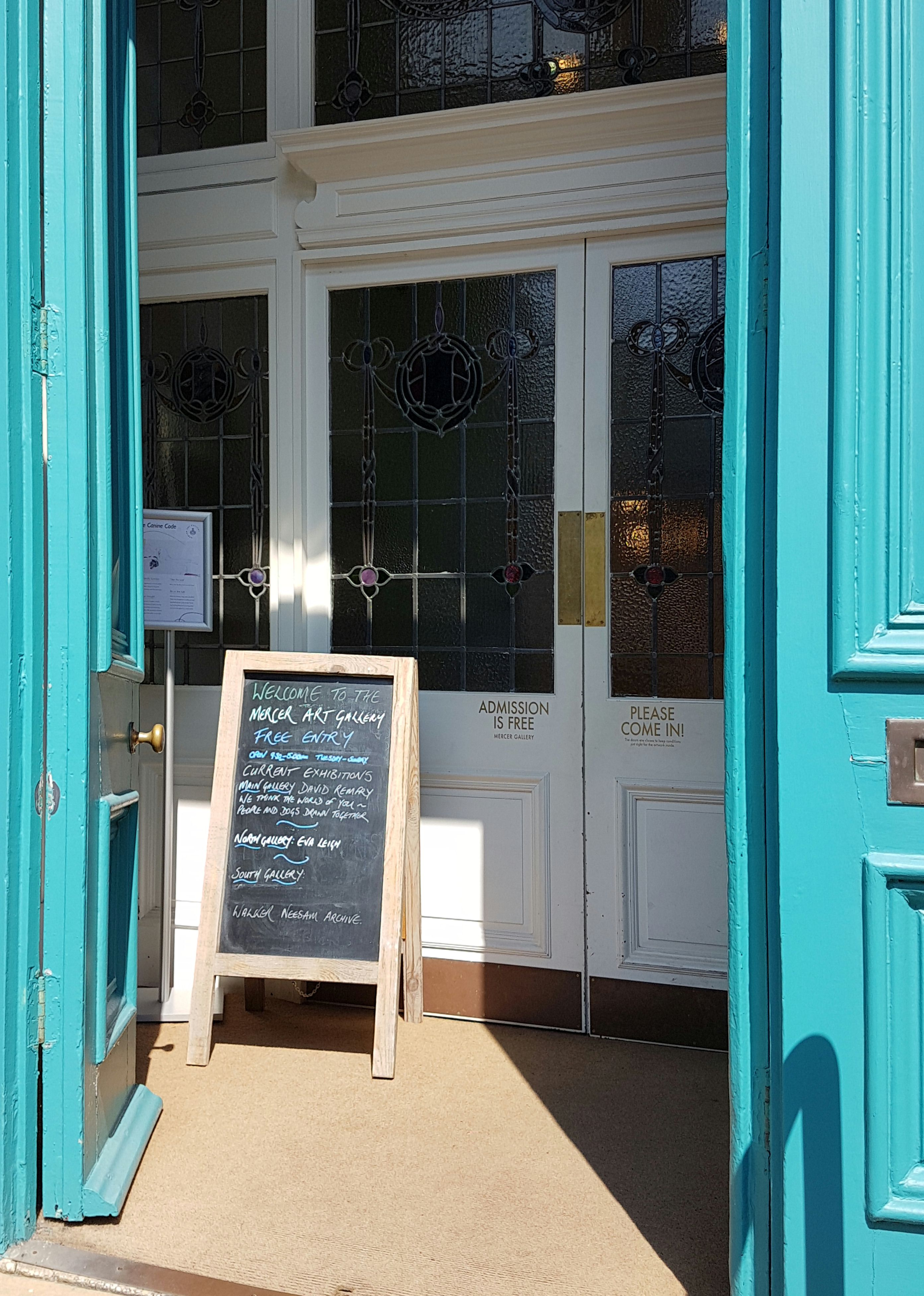
Mercer Art Gallery advertisement

In her later years, Leigh's work was largely forgotten by the public. After she died, the family of Herbert Bannister Whone donated part of his collection of her work to the Mercer Art Gallery, but she still remained forgotten until 2023, when staff at the gallery rediscovered her works while conducting an inventory of the gallery's collections. The standard of the work impressed the staff, who could not discover who Eva Leigh was. According to Tom King, chair of the Friends of the Mercer Gallery, "They were entranced by these delicate studies, many still unmounted and never having been exhibited. I too was charmed".

A considerable amount of research was carried out on the subject of Leigh by Fiona Young, of Harrogate, who then wrote a booklet called Finding Eva Leigh, and gave a lecture on the artist's career at Harrogate Library on 26 June 2024. In summer 2024, the Friends of the Mercer Art Gallery funded an exhibition of her work at the gallery, thus finally bringing Leigh's work fully into the public arena. In July 2025 The Arts Society used Leigh's exhibition as one of their foci for sixth form arts students, who were on a week-long work placement there. Among other educational tasks, the students were asked to write down their responses to the displayed works, and ultimately to make an informal presentation of what they had learned.
