= Henri-Guillaume Schlesinger =

French portrait and genre painter

- Born: Wilhelm Heinrich Schlesinger; August 6, 1814; Frankfurt am Main, German Confederation
- Died: February 21, 1893 (aged 78); Neuilly-sur-Seine, France
- Education: Academy of Fine Arts Vienna
- Occupation: Painter
- Known for: Portrait and genre painting (especially depictions of young women)

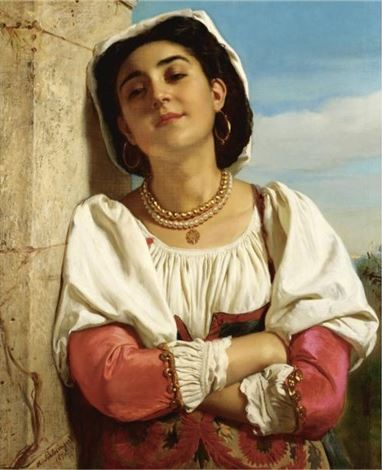
An Italian beauty

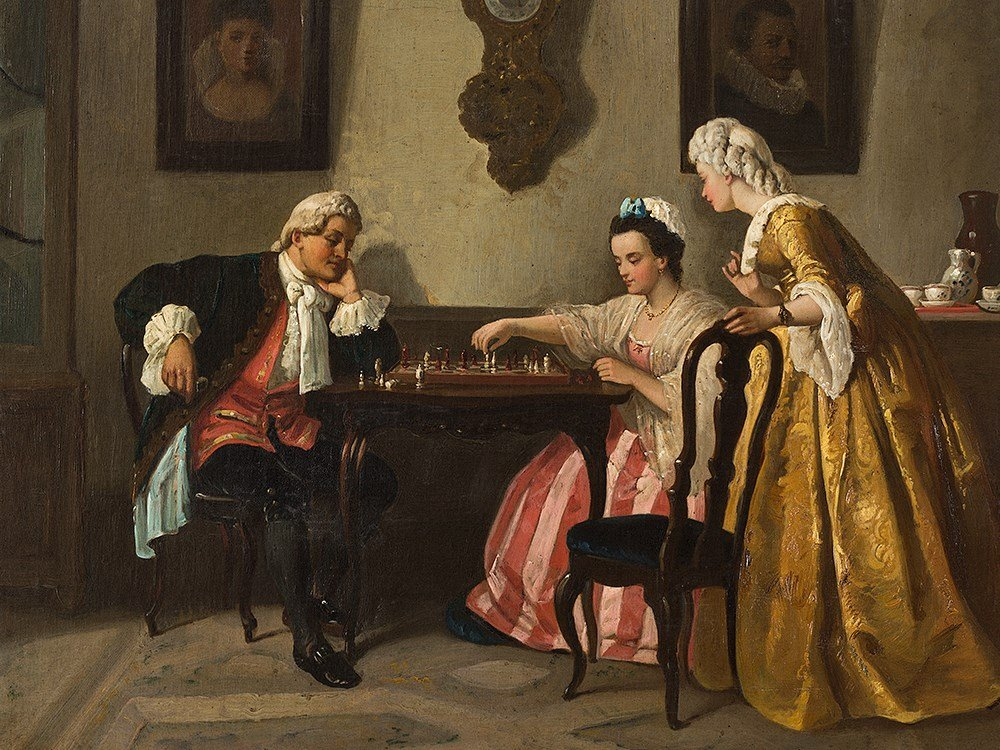
The chess players

Henri-Guillaume Schlesinger, originally Wilhelm Heinrich Schlesinger (6 August 1814, in Frankfurt am Main – 21 February 1893, in Neuilly-sur-Seine) was a French portrait and genre painter of German birth. He was especially known for his lively and sensitive depictions of young women.

== Biography ==
He studied painting at the Academy of Fine Arts, Vienna, and was originally active in that city. He then moved to Paris, where he participated in the Salon from 1840 to 1889 and received two medals.

During a visit to Istanbul in 1837, he was commissioned to do several official paintings of Sultan Mahmud II, including a large equestrian portrait and one of the Sultan wearing Western-style clothing, which is now on display at the Topkapi Palace Museum. One was donated to King Louis-Philippe by Mustafa Reşid Pasha, who was then serving as Ambassador to France, and may now be seen at Versailles.

His painting "The Five Senses" was purchased by Empress Eugénie in 1865. The following year, he was named a Chevalier in the Legion of Honor and became a French citizen in 1870, just before the outbreak of the Franco-Prussian War. During the war and the subsequent Commune, he lived in London.

In addition to oil paintings, he was a watercolorist and painted miniatures on ivory.

== Works ==
Image	Title	Date	Size	Notes	Collection
	Portrait of a young lady	1832			Private collection
	Portrait of the art dealer Dominik Artaria	1836	76.5 x 60.5 cm		Unknown
	Bust portrait of a Viennese middle-class woman	1836	76.5 x 60.5 cm		Vienna, Belvedere
	Equestrian portrait of Sultan Mahmud II	1837			Private collection
	Portrait of a woman	1838			
	Portrait of Sultan Mahmud II	1839			Private collection
	Portrait of the writer Louis Lurine	1844			
	Blind man's buff	1844			Private collection
	Young women singing and playing the lute	1844			Private collection
	Young peasant couple	1845	42.9 x 33 cm		Private collection
	A harem interior	1846	74 x 93 cm		Private collection
	A dreamy look	1852			Private collection
	Courtly scene with a maid	1859			Private collection
	Two curious girls on the stairs before a Mediterranean landscape	1860 circa	112 x 87 cm		Private collection
	The stolen child	1861			
	Touch; the five senses	1865 circa	115.5 x 89.5 cm	Exhibited at the 1865 salon, and acquired by Napoleon III	Private collection
	Taste; the five senses	1865 circa	115.5 x 89.5 cm	Exhibited at the 1865 salon, and acquired by Napoleon III	Private collection
	Hearing; the five senses	1865 circa	115.5 x 89.5 cm	Exhibited at the 1865 salon, and acquired by Napoleon III	Private collection
	Smell; the five senses	1865 circa	115.5 x 89.5 cm	Exhibited at the 1865 salon, and acquired by Napoleon III	Private collection
	Sight; the five senses	1865 circa	115.5 x 89.5 cm	Exhibited at the 1865 salon, and acquired by Napoleon III	Private collection
	Lost in thought	1868	73 x 59.7 cm		Private collection
	Alone at the atelier	1868	125.7 x 108 cm		Philadelphia, Museum of Art
	An Egyptian girl preparing for the bath	1869	90 x 117.5 cm		Private collection
	An Italian maiden	1870	51 x 35 cm		Private collection
	An Italian beauty	1870	72.5 x 60 cm	Even if the painting is titled A Spanish beauty, if you see the artwork above has the same clothes, so is quite more likely an Italian one.	Private collection
	Girl with lovebirds	1876			Harrogate, Mercer Art Gallery
	A beautiful frame	1879 circa			
	The reprimand	1879			Private collection
	The young artist	1884			Private collection
	Girl with a mandolin	1887	107 x 63.5 cm		Private collection
	Girl with dead bird	1890	86 x 74 cm		Vienna, Kunsthistorisches Museum
	Fair in the Pyrenees		31.2 x 42.7 cm		United Kingdom, Royal Collection
	Young dancer with tambourine				Private collection
	Chess players				Private collection
	A ride				Private collection
	Turkish Woman and Chibouk				Private collection
	Welcome change		49 x 66 cm	The painting is only attributed	Private collection
