= Royal Baths, Harrogate =

Grade II listed building in Harrogate, England

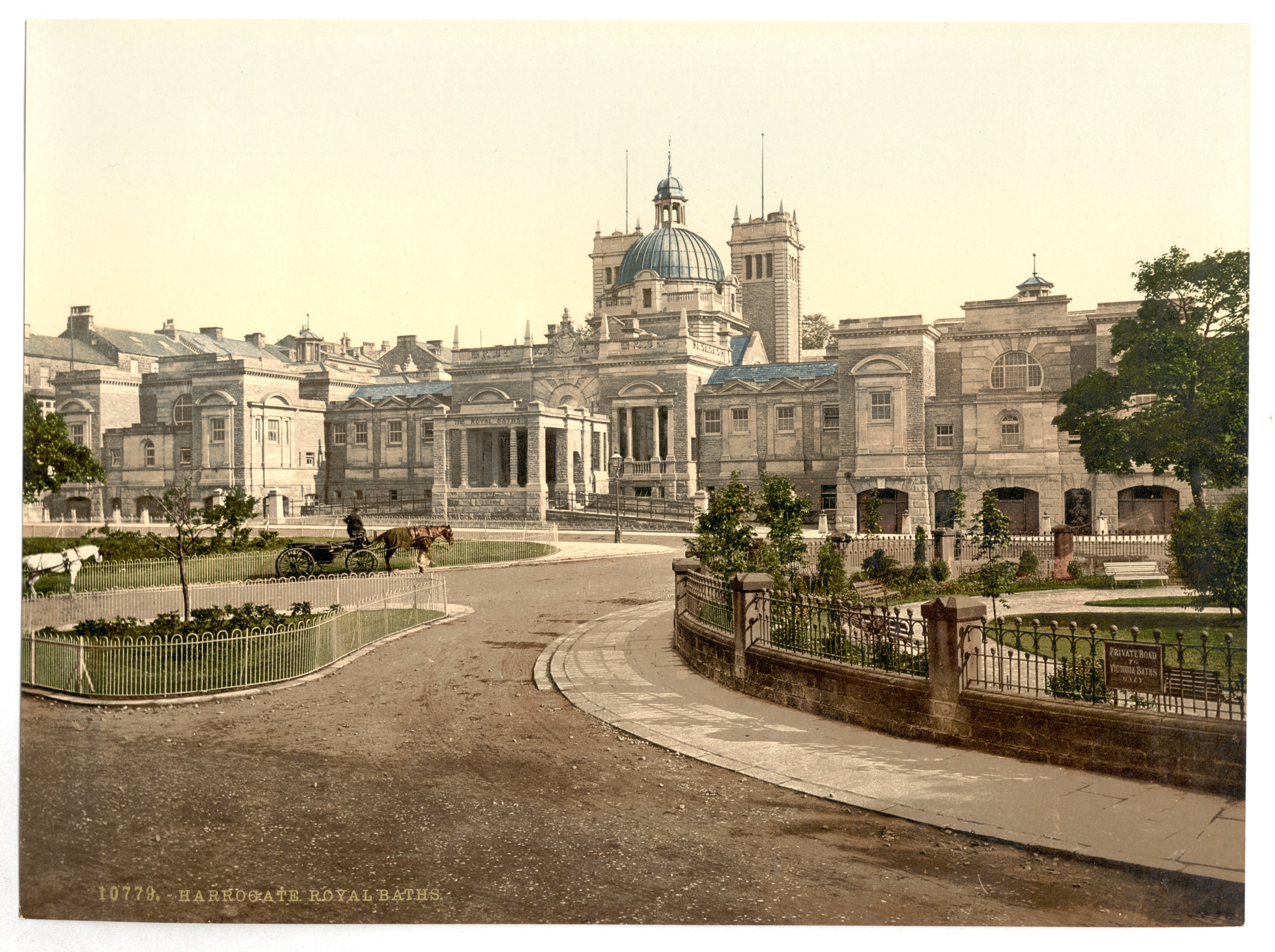
- The Royal Baths c. 1900

General information
- Type: Baths and wash houses in Britain; Victorian Turkish baths
- Location: Harrogate, North Yorkshire, Crescent Road, England
- Coordinates: 53.99434°N 1.54434°W
- Opened: 1897
- Operator: Brimhams Active

Design and construction
- Architecture firm: Baggallay and Bristowe
- Designations: Grade II Listed

Other information
- Facilities: steam room, hot rooms, massage slabs, plunge pool

Website
- www.turkishbathsharrogate.co.uk

Royal Baths, Harrogate is a Grade II listed building in Harrogate, England, which housed a hydrotherapy centre established by the Corporation of Harrogate in 1897 as part of its vision to make Harrogate the Nation's Spa Town. The Royal Baths continued in full operation through to 1969, winding down fairly rapidly after losing a National Health Service contract in that year. In contemporary times its Victorian Turkish baths continue to be operated, the rest of the building being used as a restaurant and tourism information centre.

== History ==
Harrogate had been a spa town since the late 16th century, when William Slingsby promoted the drinking of water from Tewit Well, based on his travels to Germany and exposure to its culture of mineral waters. In the 1840s, a vogue for hydrotherapy developed in the UK arising out of the writings and lectures of Richard Tappin Claridge; hydrotherapy hotels were established in a number of towns, notably Buxton in the Peak District in 1842, and Ben Rhydding in West Yorkshire in 1844–46. A number of unsuccessful attempts to introduce hydrotherapy in Harrogate were made in the 1860s. In 1878 the Swan Hydropathic (later called Harrogate Hydropathic) was established; and later the Cairn Hydro and the Harlow Manor Hydro.

The corporation of Harrogate, in furtherance of a vision for the town set out by Richard Ellis took it on itself to fund the establishment of a public hydro, to be the "equal if not superior to any of the kind in existence", spending £120,000 on baths to a design by the London firm of Baggallay and Bristowe, winners of the design competition ahead of 25 others. The Turkish baths in the interior have been described as a "glazed brick Nirvana with Moorish-style arches, columns and screens, terrazzo floors and walls of colourful brickwork". They were completely refurbished and restored during 2004 and 2006, and remain today as the only still operational Victorian Turkish baths in England to have been built during Queen Victoria's reign.

Harrogate's improvement commissioners, who had bought up all of the spa facilities in Low Harrogate from 1868 onwards, positioned the Royal Baths as the central spa facility in the town, replacing all existing facilities with the exception of the Royal Pump Room which was retained as the centre for drinking Harrogate's waters.

The Royal baths were built on the site of the old Montpellier baths and declared open by the Duke of Cambridge on 23 July 1897. Water was pumped to the baths from a number of different springs and treatments were offered for conditions, including rheumatism, arthritis and sciatica. The range of facilities offered included, according to Richard Metcalfe:

The Harrogate Special Combination with shower, wave ascending, descending, and spinal douches; the Harrogate Massage Douche, improved Vapour Baths, local Vapour Baths, local Douche Baths, Needle Baths, Liver Packs, plain Water Baths, Inhalation and Pulverisation Rooms, &c. In addition to these there are Hot-air [Victorian Turkish] Baths, Electric Douches, Throat Sprays, Peat or Mud Baths, &c., Brine, "D'Arsonval High Frequency Electric Baths," Electric Light and Ozone Baths, &c., the Plombieres. Treatment for muco-membranous colitus, &c.

An indication of the scale of operation at the Royal Baths is given in Spas that heal; that in August 1898, 18,723 baths were given. A promotional piece in a 1916 edition of The Illustrated London News suggested the baths offered 80 different treatments. The Royal Baths continued as a successful venture through the inter-war period, providing around 90,000 treatments per year. From 1946 to 1969, National Health Service interest in the Royal Baths as a treatment centre saw demand rise to as high as 150,000 treatments per year. However, with the end the NHS's contract with the Royal Baths in 1969, interest in the facilities wound down, the council shifting the focus of its interest to the burgeoning conference market.

In 2023, only Harrogate's Victorian Turkish baths remain in operation as part of a health spa. Other parts of the building are occupied by a Chinese restaurant and Harrogate Tourist Information Centre.

== See also ==
- Listed buildings in Harrogate (Low Harrogate Ward)
