= Joseph Thors =

English painter

Joseph Thors (c. 1835–1920) was a Dutch landscape artist whose work was exhibited widely in England during the late 19th century.

== Life and work ==
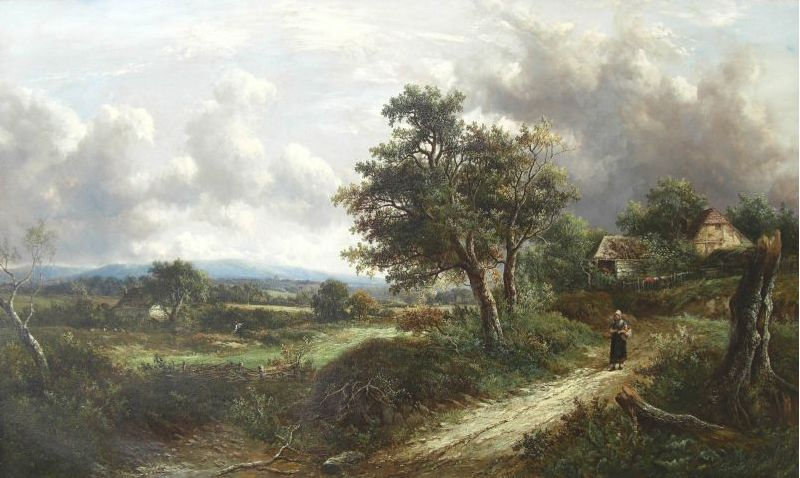
Scene near Cheltenham

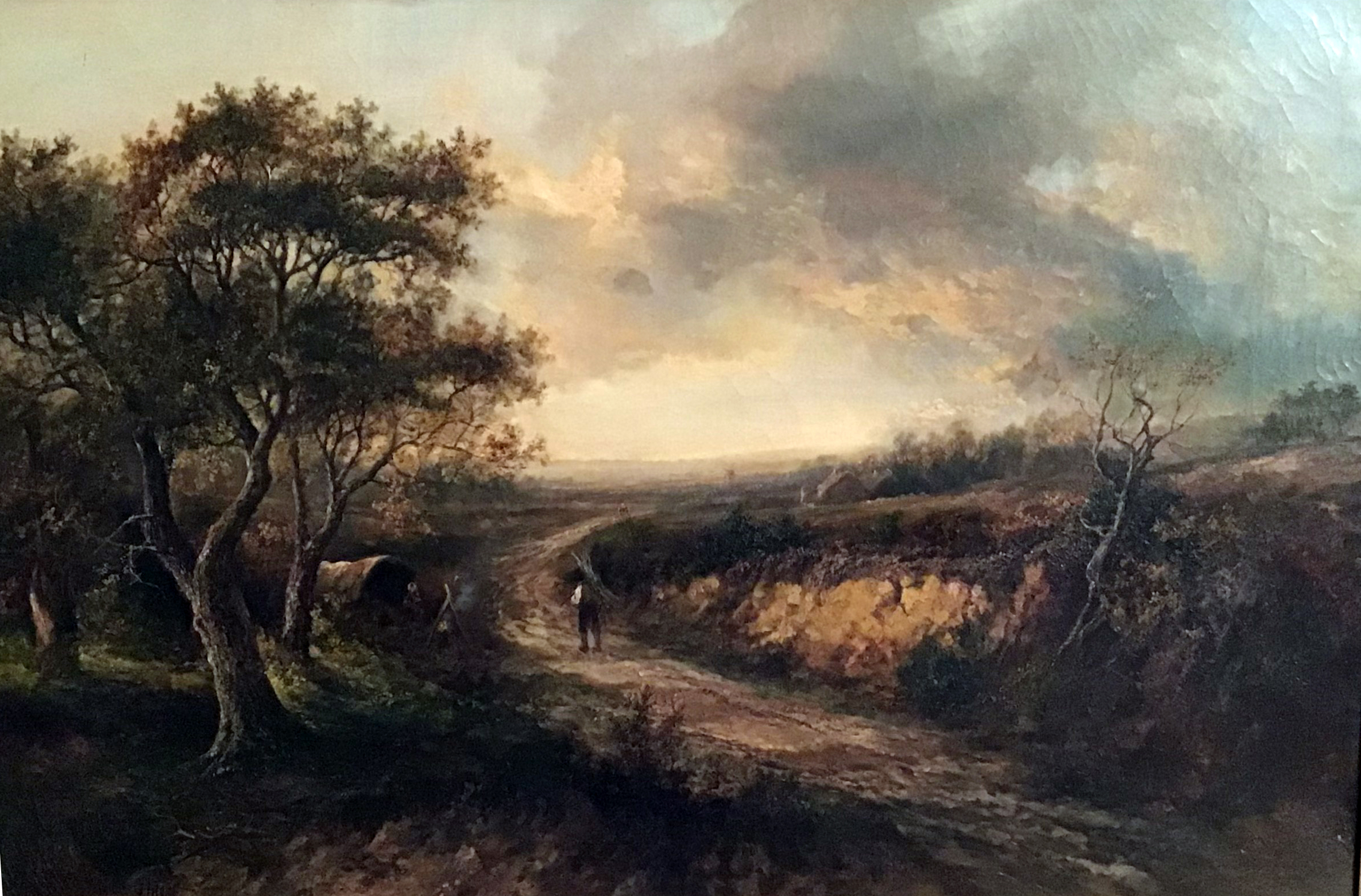
Joseph Thors, landscape in England

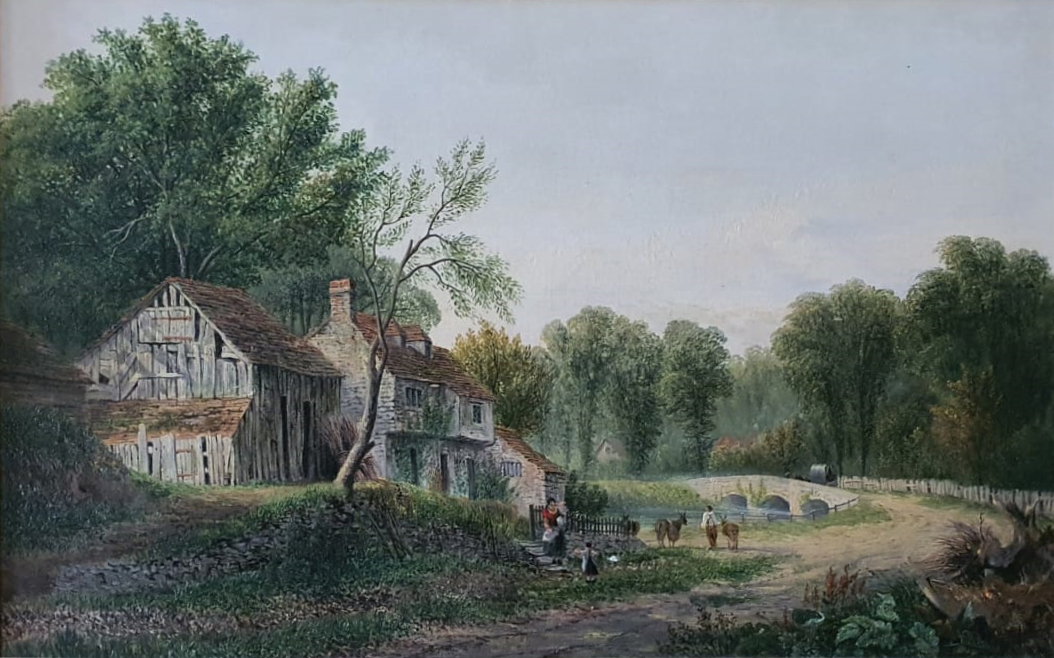
Joseph Thors, English landscape with a cottage nearby to a bridge, with people and livestock

Relatively little is known about Thors's life. He has traditionally been regarded as British, but was in fact Dutch.

Joseph Thors was born in Amsterdam in the mid 1830s. By 1861 he was lodging at 115 Great Russell Street, Finsbury, in London. In the following year, on 25 June 1862, he married Hendrina Mendelsohn, a native of Utrecht.

In 1881 the couple were living at another London address, 42 Ampthill Square, St Pancras, with their son Samuel, who was 10 years old at the time and had been born in the city. By 1911 they had moved to Islington, where they are recorded as living at 20 Huntingdon Street. By then they had had three children, one of whom had died. Both gave their place of birth as Holland, their status as residents, and their nationality as Dutch. Joseph Thors was still living in Islington when he died in late 1920 at the age of 85 years.

He was recorded as living and working in London, then Birmingham - he also travelled for a while in France. He exhibited at the Royal Academy of Arts, British Institution, and Society of British Artists in London, and was also exhibited in Birmingham between 1869 – 1900.

Thors is regarded as belonging to the Birmingham school though his style is of the Norwich school which he admired. He painted in oils, his work depicting peaceful English rustic scenes featuring landscapes, cottages, people and animals. He also painted river scenes and occasionally coastlines.

His output was prolific and there are reported to be 14 of his paintings in public collections in the United Kingdom.
