= Malcolm Neesam =

English historian and writer

- Malcom Neesam, in 1995
- Born: 28 June 1946; Harrogate, England
- Died: 28 June 2022 (aged 76); Harrogate, England
- Occupations: Historian, writer, librarian, archivist
- Years active: 1972–2022 as published author
- Notable work: – Harrogate Great Chronicle, 1332–1841 (2005) – Wells and Swells: The Golden Age of Harrogate Spa, 1842–1923 (2022)
- Awards: Freedom of the Borough of Harrogate

Malcolm George Neesam (28 June 1946 – 28 June 2022) was an English historian and writer specialising in the history of Harrogate, North Yorkshire. He was also a librarian and archivist. His major works were the first two parts of a projected trilogy on that subject: Harrogate Great Chronicle, 1332–1841 (2005) and Wells and Swells: The Golden Age of Harrogate Spa, 1842–1923 (2022). The third part was to remain unfinished when he died, although his research papers are preserved in the Walker-Neesam Archive at the Mercer Art Gallery, Harrogate.

For his services as a historian, Neesam was awarded the Freedom of the Borough of Harrogate by Harrogate Borough Council in 1996, when he was also given honorary membership of The Harrogate Club. He was involved in the inception of the Harrogate Brown Plaque Scheme, and was influential in the listing of many Harrogate buildings. He was a founder member of Harrogate Civic Society and assisted other major local organisations where their work required historical input. For thirty years he wrote the weekly "Bygone Harrogate" column in the Harrogate Advertiser, and his published works spanned a period of fifty years.

== Background ==
Malcolm George Neesam was born on 28 June 1946 in a nursing home on Ripon Road, Harrogate, West Riding of Yorkshire. His father worked in a shoe-sole factory. His mother's maiden name was Craggs. (Note: GRO: Births Sep 1946 Neesam Malcolm G. Craggs Knaresbro' 2c 118) He was a pupil at St Peter's Church of England Primary School, and Christ Church Secondary School for Boys (later amalgamated with St Aidan's Church of England High School, Harrogate). Neesam never married. He died of cancer in a Harrogate care home on his 76th birthday in 2022. After his death, Graham Chalmers of the Harrogate Advertiser described him as "Harrogate's greatest historian", and said he had made "a lifetime's contribution to Harrogate's civic life which it is difficult to over-state".

=== Personality ===
The Stray Ferret said:

Unfailingly polite, [Neesam] was nevertheless often reserved and diffident in public. He rarely talked about his private life but close friends say he had a keen sense of humour, which could border on the macabre at times, and was an excellent cook.

The Harrogate Advertiser said:

Deeply committed to the idea of civic pride, generous in his time and supportive of numerous good works in the community over the years, there has scarcely been a signal major public project in Harrogate in recent decades where Malcolm's extensive knowledge of the town's past has not fed into plans for the future in a positive fashion to the benefit of everyone who lives here. More than merely a brilliant historian, Malcolm Neesam throughout his life represented what it means to be a citizen of his town and of his nation in the best possible way with modesty and respect.

Former chairman of Harrogate Civic Society, Henry Pankhurst, said:

[Neesam] was always very well dressed, very precise in language and correct in an old fashioned way. He was immensely gifted and also had an extremely good memory, which proved to be of value as a historian. He was self-sufficient and determined but always appreciative of his friendships and any help he received from anyone.

== Career ==
=== Employee ===
Neesam served three years as a Harrogate Central Library assistant. He then trained and qualified as an archivist and librarian at the University of Leeds. He spent over four years in Hereford setting up a library service for children, then was employed as one of the Duchy of Lancaster's archivists in Northwood, Hillingdon, London. After that he moved back to Harrogate and commuted to York, where he was the York city music librarian until 1974, the year when local government and its employees were reorganised. However the reorganisation made him county music and audiovisiual librarian, overseeing new administration and the development of media from vinyl through cassette tape to compact discs. From 1996 he was arranging vacations for visiting Americans, for the firm Alumni Holidays.

=== Historian ===
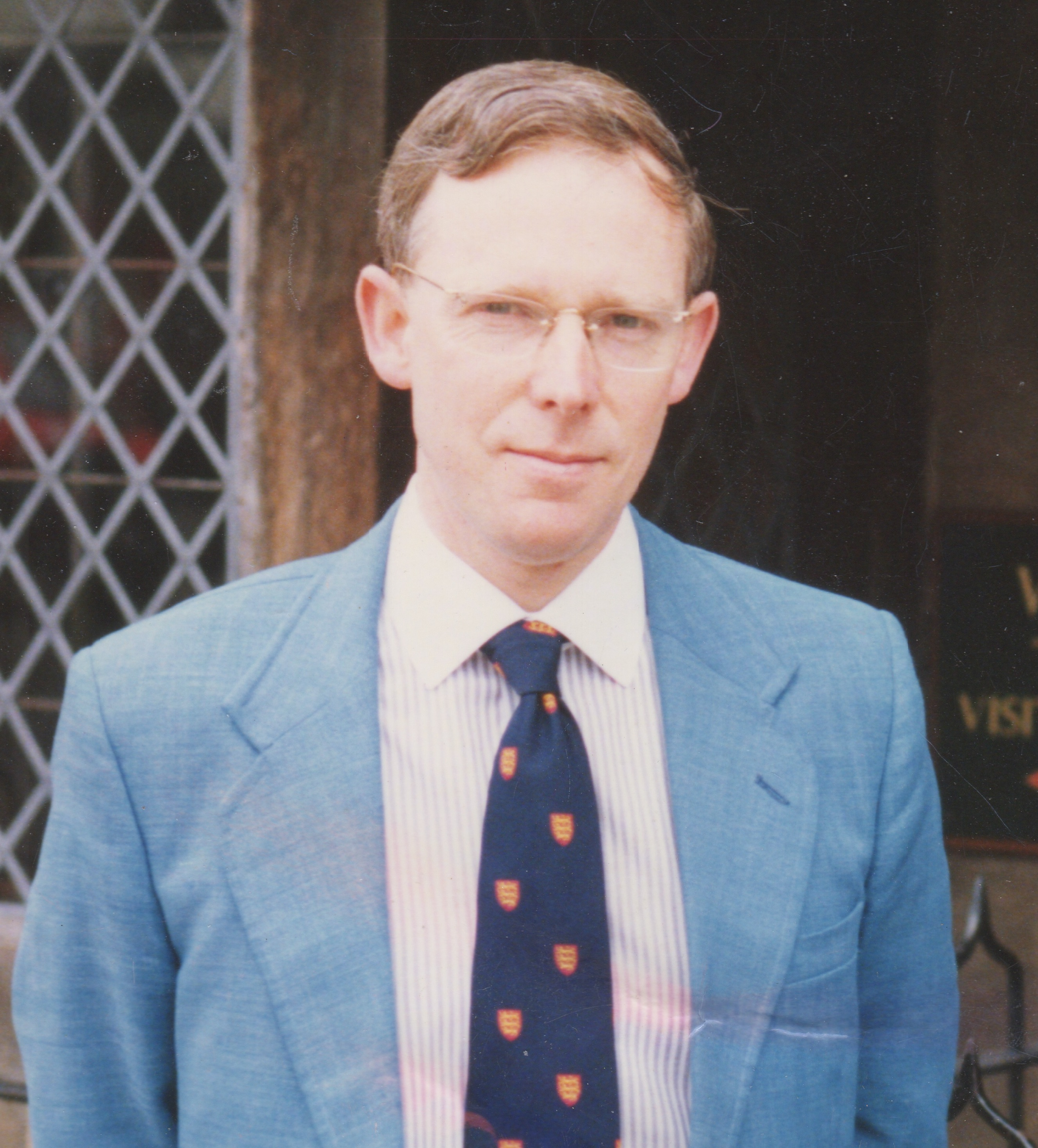
Malcolm Neesam in Stratford-upon-Avon, in August1988

Neesam's literary life began when as a schoolboy he wrote stories. In 1972 he was asked by the Library Association to edit the 16-page booklet Into Space, a "guide to children's sci-fi", which was distributed throughout the libraries of England. While still an employee in York, Neesam was also serving as a tour guide there. With Alumni Holidays he gave lectures on the local environment, literature and architecture. He became a full-time historical author in 2006, and in due course he was termed "chronicler of our town" by Harrogate MP Andrew Jones. As a member of the Harrogate Society, he received requests to write local company histories, and to assist with the creation of commemorative plaques in the town. Neesam wrote a "weekly column in the Harrogate Advertiser running for 30 years on every aspect of the town's heritage".

Neesam's life's work as a historian was his projected trilogy of works on the history of Harrogate. It took him forty years of research and preparation to finally produce the first part in 2005: his weighty 448-page Harrogate Great Chronicle, 1332–1841. The second part was a two-volume set, of 684 and 598 pages respectively. In 2022, when he published it as Wells and Swells: The Golden Age of Harrogate Spa, 1842–1923, The Harrogate Club named its dining room after him. When he died, he was still engaged upon the uncompleted third part, which was intended to encompass Harrogate's history from 1923 onwards. Neesam said of his concentration on Harrogate history: "Some writers can turn to anything. I can only write about things that interest me".

Besides writing, Neesam's historical work included involvement with the listing of various Harrogate buildings, and in the establishment of a conservation area there – the first one in the town. He was also in at the inception of the Harrogate Brown Plaque scheme, when he took part in designing Harrogate's first brown plaque, dedicated to Tewit Well, in 1971. He was still unveiling them in 2022, when the 89th one was installed in honour of The Harrogate Club.

== Institutions and honours ==
=== Honours ===
Neesam was made an honorary member of The Harrogate Club in May 1996, when he was given Freedom of the Borough "for his services as a historian", and "in recognition of his eminence as a local historian and for the help and advice he had given to the Council on a range of matters for many years", by Harrogate Borough Council.

=== Harrogate Civic Society ===
In 1970 or 1971 Neesam was a founder member of Harrogate Civic Society, then known as the Harrogate Society. Harrogate trader William Woods said:

It was Malcolm Neesam, Walter Davey and myself started Harrogate Civic Society in 1970 standing outside Woods [shop] when we urgently felt the need for a conservation society to primarily stop the five phase traffic management scheme with the last phase including a fly over passing close to the Majestic Hotel.

=== Other organisations ===
Neesam was associated with the organisation Friends of Valley Gardens, and helped lead the reopening ceremony of the restored Old Magnesia Well Pump Room on 6 October 2015 when it was about to become an information and education centre. He was also associated with the Friends of the Mercer Art Gallery, and gave a talk to that association in 2017, about "Harrogate's connection with the Russian Imperial Family". He was vice president of Harrogate International Festivals, which asked him in 2016 to write the history of its music festival on the occasion of its 50th anniversary, and the finale of the 2022 music festival was dedicated to Neesam. He was involved with Harrogate Theatre and Harrogate Dramatic Society, and assisted in the creation of a new play about Samson Fox: The Man who Captured Sunlight, which was premiered after his death, on 23 September 2022.

== Walker-Neesam Archive ==
As of 2022, Neesam's "vast collection of papers and photo library" which "took up an entire room at his home" was to be deposited in the Mercer Art Gallery, Harrogate, as part of the Walker-Neesam Archive. That archive also includes the papers and historical research of Harold Walker, a former editor of the Harrogate Herald.

== Publications ==
Note: some of Neesam's earlier publications were credited on the title page to "M.G. Neesam".

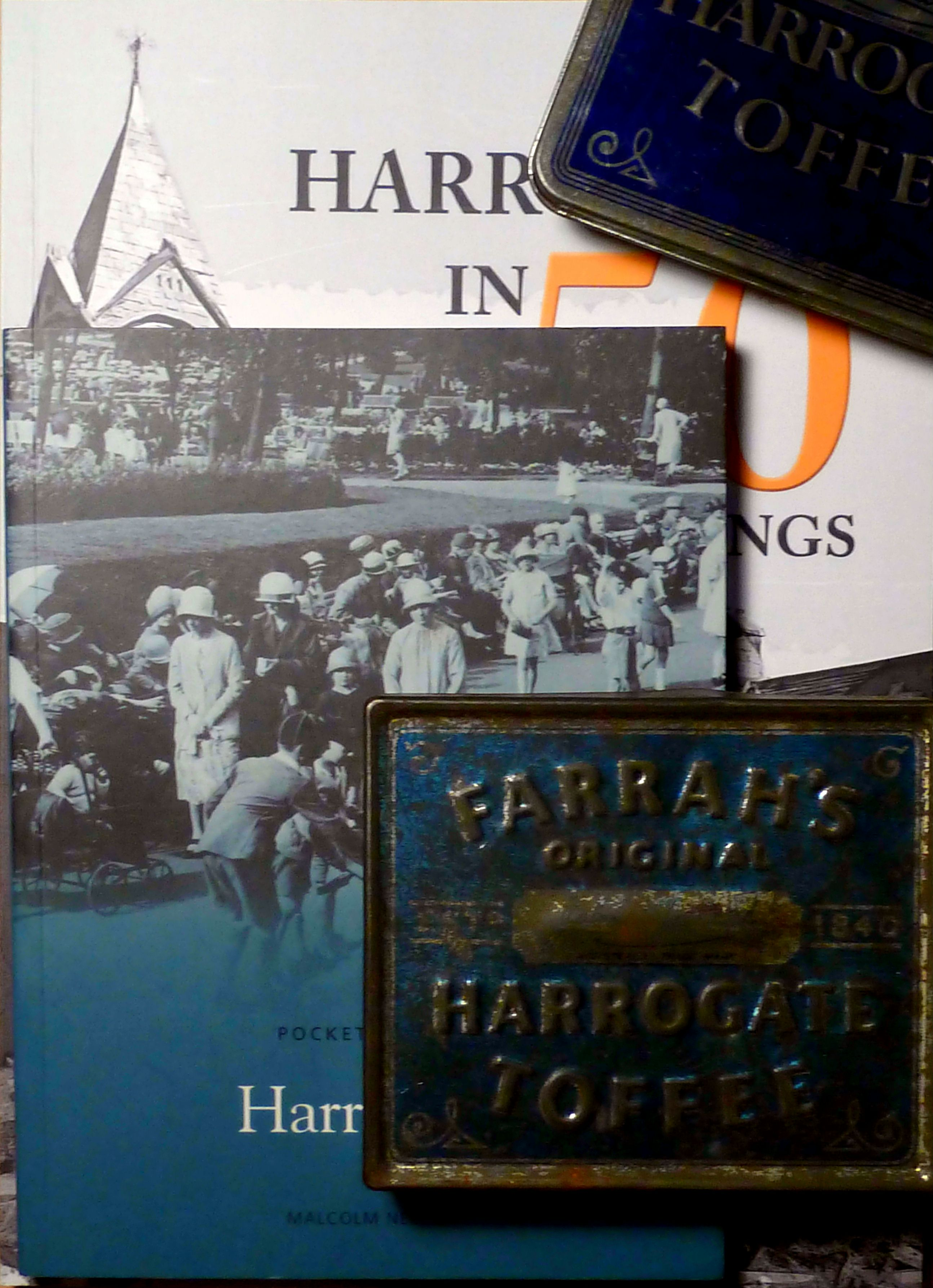
Two books by Neesam, with vintage John Farrah toffee tins as paperweights

=== Books and pamphlets ===
- Neesam, Malcolm, ed. (1972). Into Space. United Kingdom: Library Association, Youth Libraries Group. ISBN 9780853651161.
- Neesam, Malcolm, ed. (1977). Yearbook: 1977: Into Space. UK: Library Association. ISBN 9780853653097.
- Neesam, Malcolm, ed. (1986). Thorpe's Illustrated Guide to Harrogate of 1886. ISBN 9780948742040. "New edition of 1886 edition by Thorpe"
- Neesam, Malcolm (1989). Exclusively Harrogate. Dalesman Publishing Co Ltd. ISBN 978-1870071413.
- Neesam, Malcolm (1992). Harrogate in Old Picture Postcards. Europese Bibliotheek. ISBN 978-9028823525.
- Neesam, Malcolm (1993). Ogden 1893-1993. 100 Years. A short history of a family business. Ogden. ISBN 978-0951096932. (The ISBN is a 2013 reprint)
- Neesam, Malcolm (1995). Harrogate (Archive Photographs). The History Press; UK. ISBN 978-0752401546.
- Neesam, Malcolm (1999). Harrogate (Landmark City Guides). Landmark Publishing Ltd. ISBN 978-1901522556.
- Neesam, Malcolm, ed. (1999). Bygone Harrogate. Harrogate: Harrogate Advertiser. ISBN 9781859831557.
- Neesam, Malcolm (2000). Hotel Majestic. Paramount Hotels. ISBN 978-0953786107.
- Neesam, Malcolm (2001). Harrogate (Tempus History & Guide): A History of the English Spa from the Earliest Times to the Present. The History Press. ISBN 978-0752422343.
- Neesam, Malcolm (2003). Harrogate Grammar School: A Centennial History. Manor House Publishing. ISBN 978-0951096956.
- Neesam, Malcolm (2005). Walk Around Historic Harrogate. Salisbury, UK: Frith Book Company. ISBN 9781845676513.
- Neesam, Malcolm (2005). Harrogate Great Chronicle, 1332-1841. Carnegie Publishing Ltd. ISBN 978-1859361450.
- Neesam, Malcolm (2005). Harrogate (Pocket Images). The History Press Ltd. ISBN 978-1845881498.
- Neesam, Malcolm; Earl, John; Quin, Stuart (2008). Kursaal: A History of Harrogate's Royal Hall. Harrogate: Harrogate International Centre. ISBN 978-0955895302.
- Neesam, Malcolm (2010). Harrogate (Landmark Visitor Guide). Landmark Publishing Ltd. ISBN 9781843064282.
- Neesam, Malcolm; Butterworth, Christopher; Raworths Law Firm (2012). Raworths: 125 Years of a Harrogate Law Firm. ISBN 978-0951096925.
- Neesam, Malcolm (2013). Ogden Harrogate: 1893-2013: 120 Years - a History of a Family Business. ISBN 9780951096932.
- Neesam, Malcolm (2017). Music Over the Waters. Harrogate, UK: Manor Place Press and the Harrogate International Festival.
- Neesam, Malcolm (2018). Harrogate in 50 Buildings. Amberley Publishing. ISBN 978-1445681115.
- Neesam, Malcolm (2019). A-Z of Harrogate: Places-People-History. Amberley Publishing. ISBN 978-1445696560.
- Neesam, Malcolm (2022). Wells and Swells: The Golden Age of Harrogate Spa, 1842–1923. Carnegie Publishing Ltd. ISBN 978-1859362389.

=== Selected articles ===
- Neesam, Malcolm (30 September 2005). "Bygone Harrogate". Harrogate Advertiser. aeden.plus.com.
- Neesam, Malcolm (20 December 2012). "Father Christmas and the Old Magnesia Well at the Valley Gardens" (PDF). Harrogate Advertiser. friendsofvalleygard.ipage.com.
- Neesam, Malcolm (undated). "The Stray at Bogs Field – Bygone Harrogate" (PDF). Harrogate Advertiser. friendsofvalleygard.ipage.com.
- Neesam, Malcolm (undated) (4 January 2019). "History of the Crown Hotel, Harrogate". Yorkshire Magazine.

=== Reviews ===
- "[Neesam wrote] a series of mammoth books charting [Harrogate's] story from the 1500s to the present day. Painstakingly researched down to the smallest detail, the result of all Malcolm's incredible work is not only important to anyone who cares about Harrogate's past but it also throws new light on Britain's as a whole, in particular, the evolution of British society, economy and culture during the most crucial years of the Victorian era. Admirably, Mr Neesam had kept on working on the final volume of his monumental story of the town even during the toughest of times. It now lies unfinished. As recently as April [2022], he had unveiled the second volume in the mammoth series – Wells & Swells: The Golden Age of Harrogate Spa 1842–1923. An epic 1,600 pages long and typically full of painstaking detail, the massive book arrived 17 years after the publication of the opening volume, Harrogate Great Chronicle, 1332–1841".Graham Chalmers, Harrogate Advertiser 28 June 2022.

== Events ==
Between 28 October and 4 November 2023, Harrogate Central Library hosted an art exhibition called "The Public Library, the People's University", dedicated to Malcolm Neesam. Local artist Matt Wyatt, who contributed 40 works to the exhibition, said, "The show is dedicated to Malcom Neesam with his portrait and written tribute on display".
