= The Harrogate Club =

Private members' club in North Yorkshire, England

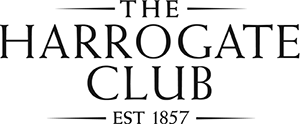

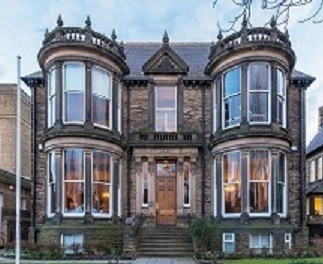
- Club house at 36 Victoria Avenue

- North Yorkshire
- Founded at: The Gascoigne's Hotel, Harrogate (1857), then Victoria Avenue, Harrogate (1886)
- Type: Originally: Gentlemen's club. Today: Social club for both sexes.
- Coordinates: 53.9914°N 1.5332°W
- Website: www.harrogateclub.co.uk

The Harrogate Club is a private members' club, open to men and women, based in Harrogate, North Yorkshire, England. Founded in 1857, it is located on Victoria Avenue, Harrogate.

== History ==
The club was founded at the Gascoigne's Hotel, Harrogate in 1857 by a group of professional men. In 1885 the Club's Committee, with funds raised from the members, decided to construct a Club House, at an ultimate cost of £3,000 (equivalent to £337,132 in 2025). The Pateley Bridge and Nidderdale Herald reported that plans were approved by Harrogate Borough Council on 2 April 1885, and the Borough Surveyor certified the building on 17 April 1886, however the architect's name was not given. Since the plans were later found in possession of the architectural firm which was in the 1880s owned by architect Arthur Bown (1851–1916), (Note: Births Mar 1851 Bown Arthur Knaresboro XXIII 434. Deaths Sep 1916 Bown Arthur 64 Knaresbro 9a 108.) of Harrogate, it has been concluded that Bown designed the building. The purpose-built Club House was opened on 25 March 1886 at 36 Victoria Avenue, Harrogate and has remained the Club's home ever since.

The Club appointed its first female president, Fiona Movley MBE and its first female honorary secretary, Catherine Wormald on 23 April 2024.

== Artefacts on display in the club house ==
The Club displays a number of marble busts and paintings from the Mercer Art Gallery under a 2016 agreement with Harrogate Borough Council, and other artefacts, which are shown to the public regularly as part of tours provided for Heritage Open Days.

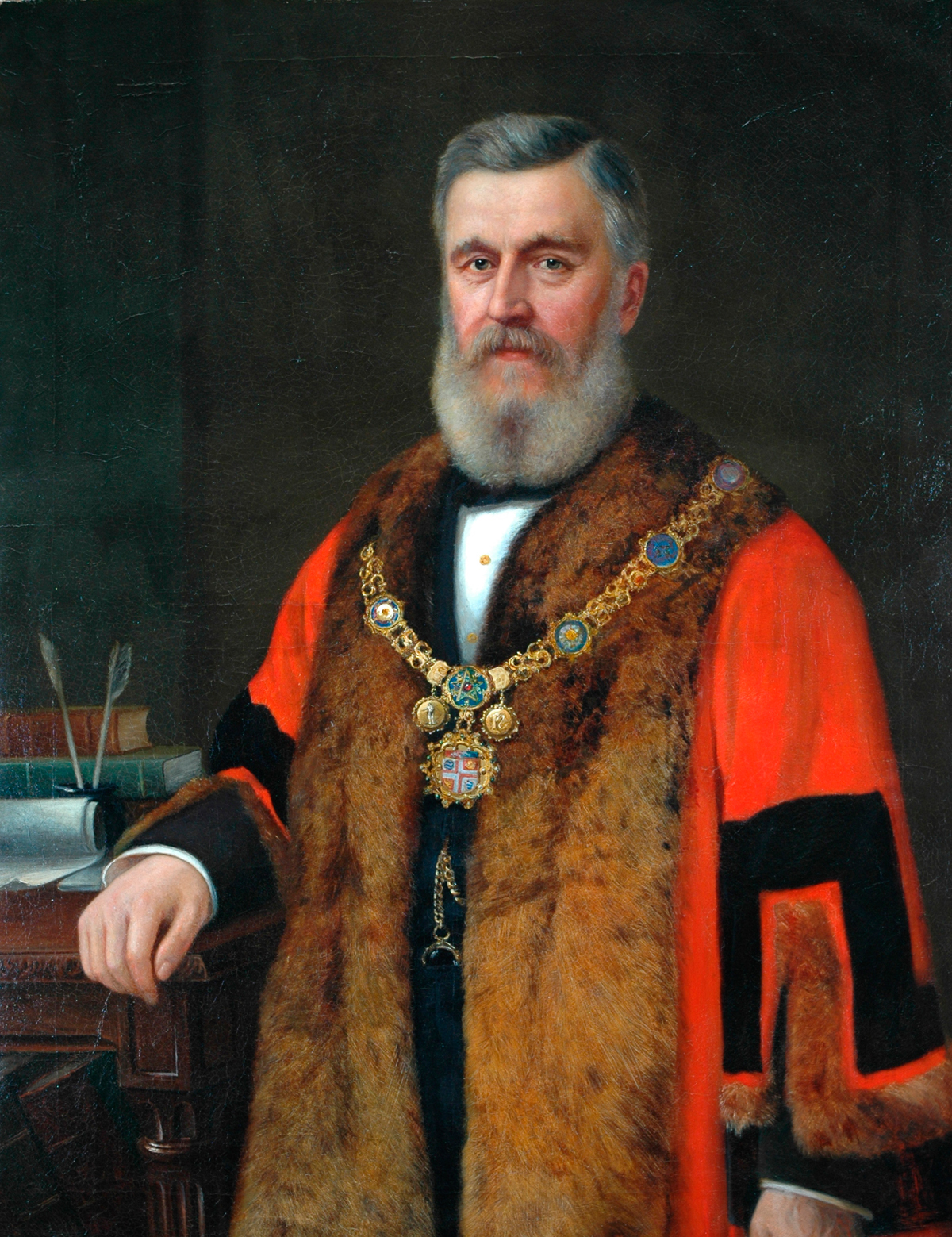
Mayor Richard Ellis by Thomas Holroyd, c. 1887

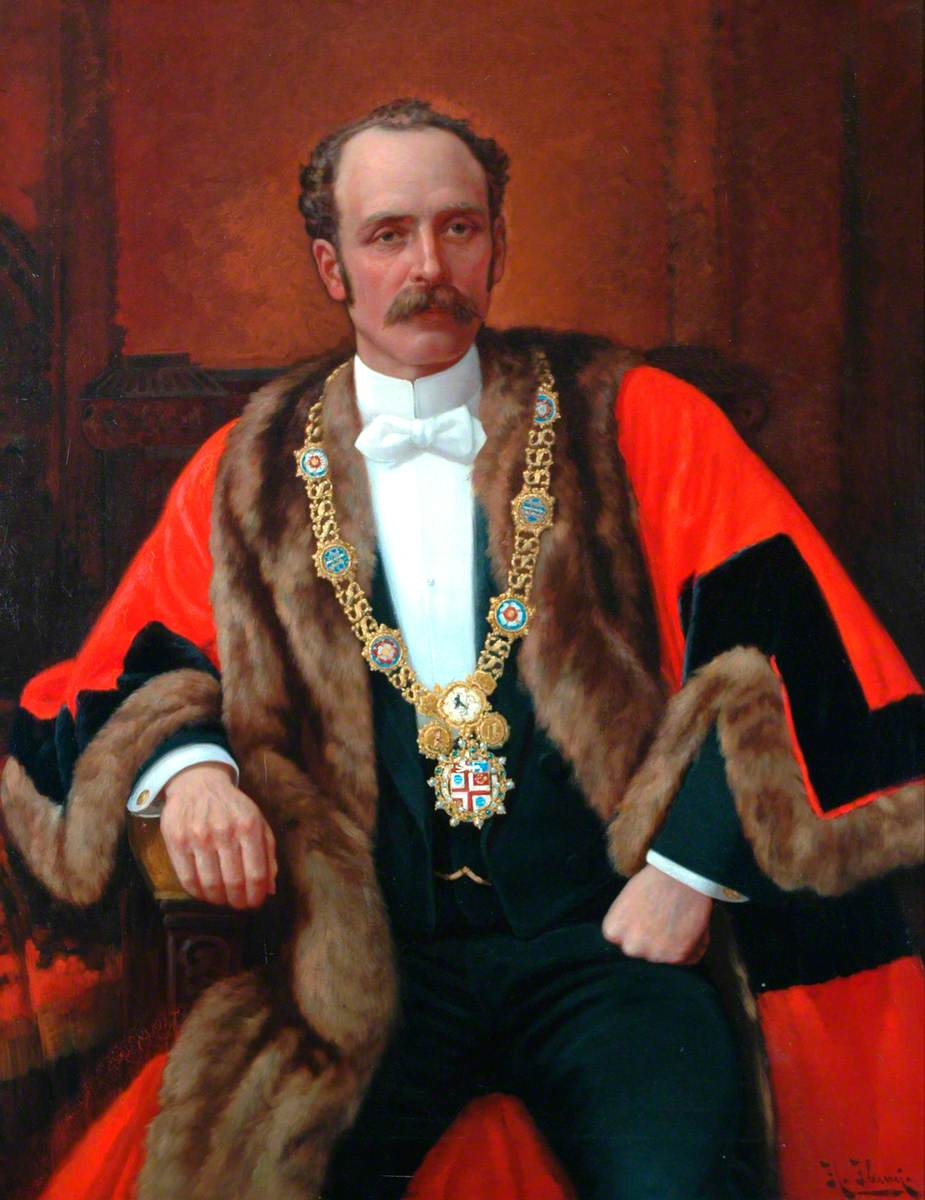
Alderman David Simpson by H. Lewis, 1900

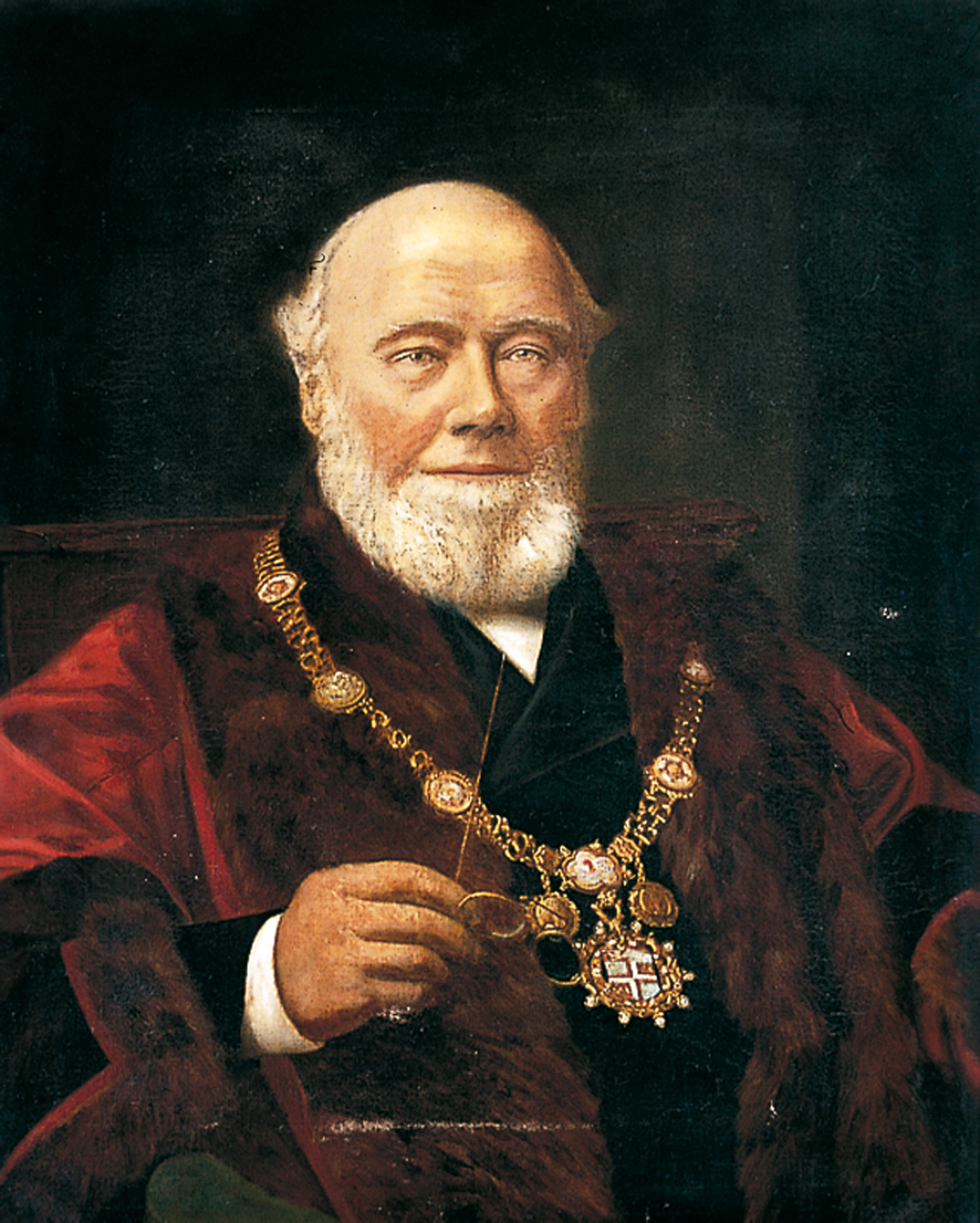
Alderman James Simpson by Thomas Holroyd, 1896

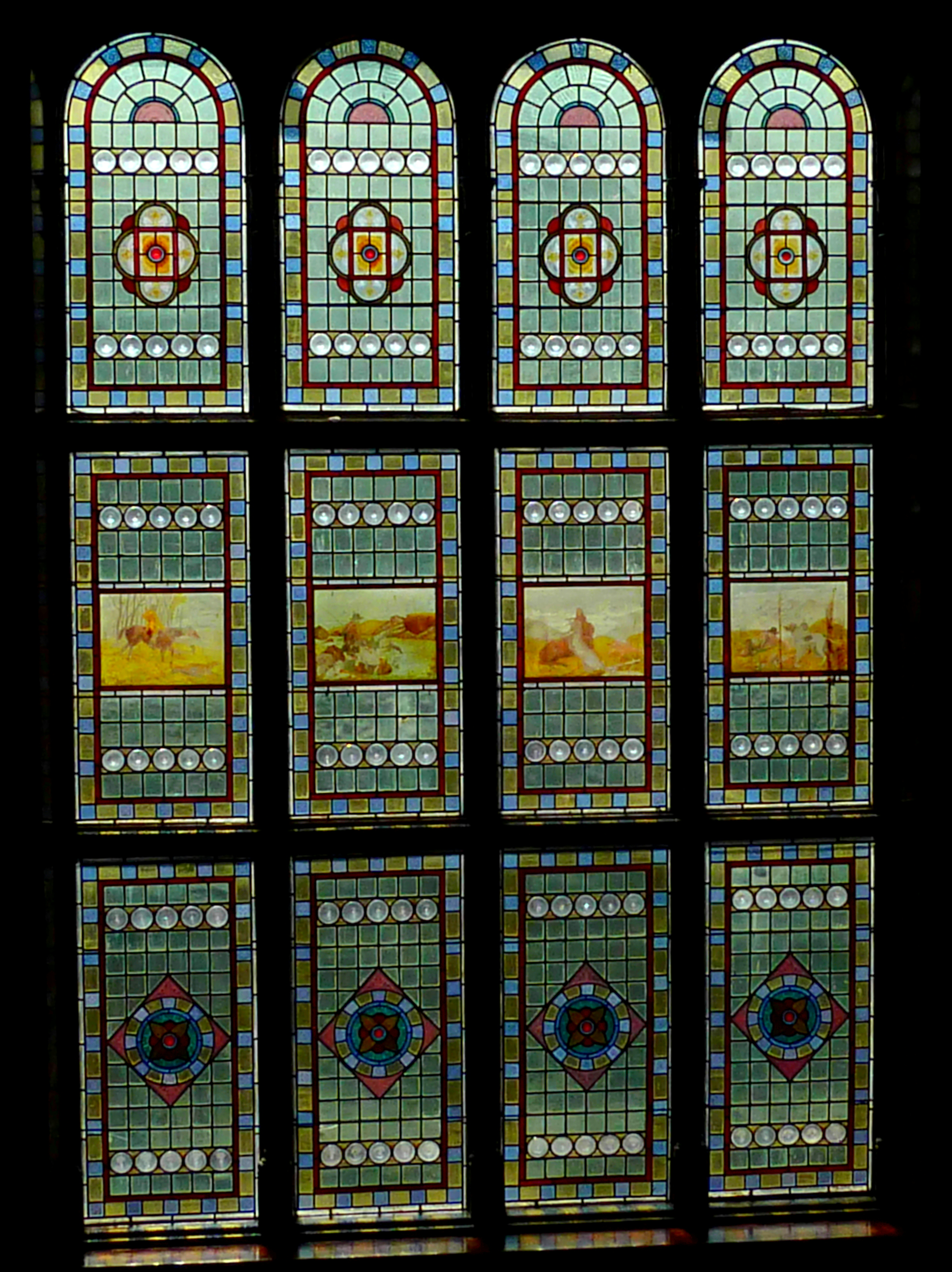
Stained-glass stairwell window

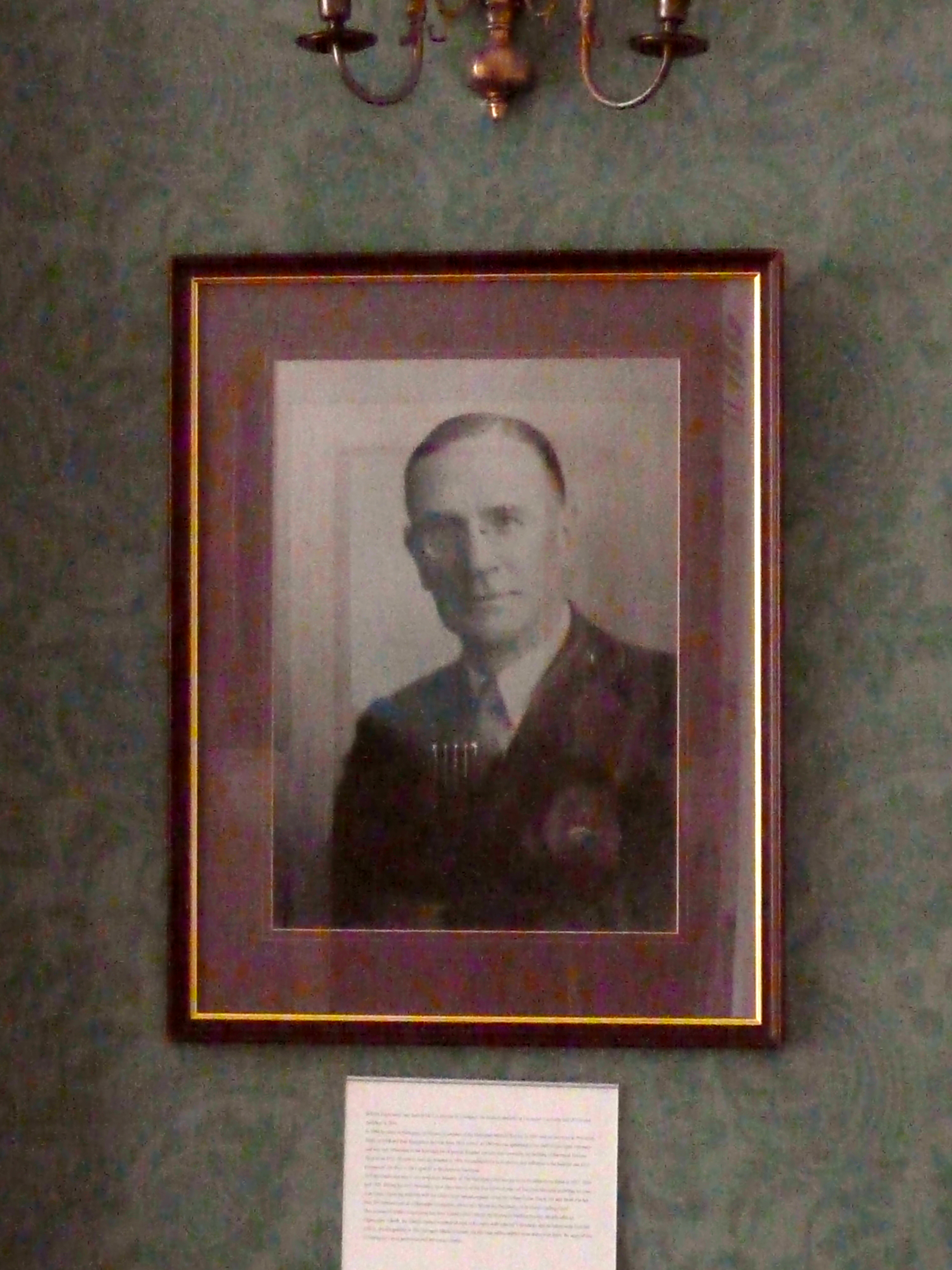
Wilfrid Edgecombe, past president of the club, 1920s

== Membership ==
Membership is open to both men and women. Membership categories include, full membership, country membership and young members' membership. In return for an annual fee members are entitled to a number of benefits including the ability to entertain friends and guests, attendance at a programme of social events and admission to selected reciprocal clubs.

Notable former members of The Harrogate Club include, Titus Salt, English industrialist and philanthropist; Samson Fox, Engineer, Industrialist and philanthropist; Cuthbert Broderick, British architect, as well as Ferdinand de Rothschild. The late Harrogate historian and writer Malcolm Neesam (d.2022) was an honorary member from the 1990s, and the club's dining room has been named after him: The Malcolm Neesam Dining Room.

=== Reciprocal arrangements with other clubs ===
The Harrogate Club has reciprocal arrangements with a number of clubs worldwide including the Sloane Club and the National Liberal Club in London, the Bath and County Club, the Liverpool Athenaeum, The New Club and The Royal Scots Club in Edinburgh, The Sociedad Bilbaina in Spain, the Union International Club in Frankfurt, The Brisbane Club in Australia, The National Club in Toronto, Canada, The Cape Town Club and Rand Club in South Africa, The University Club of Chicago and The University Club of San Francisco.

=== Visitors ===
Notable visitors to The Club include Scottish physician and author, Sir Arthur Conan Doyle. The magazine Great British Life has suggested that J. R. R. Tolkien may have been a visitor to the club.

== The Harrogate Club in popular culture ==
In September 2011 The Club appeared in an episode of Who Do You Think You Are featuring Emilia Fox, the great, great granddaughter of past member Samson Fox.
