= Harrogate District Hospital =

Hospital in North Yorkshire, England

- Harrogate and District NHS Foundation Trust
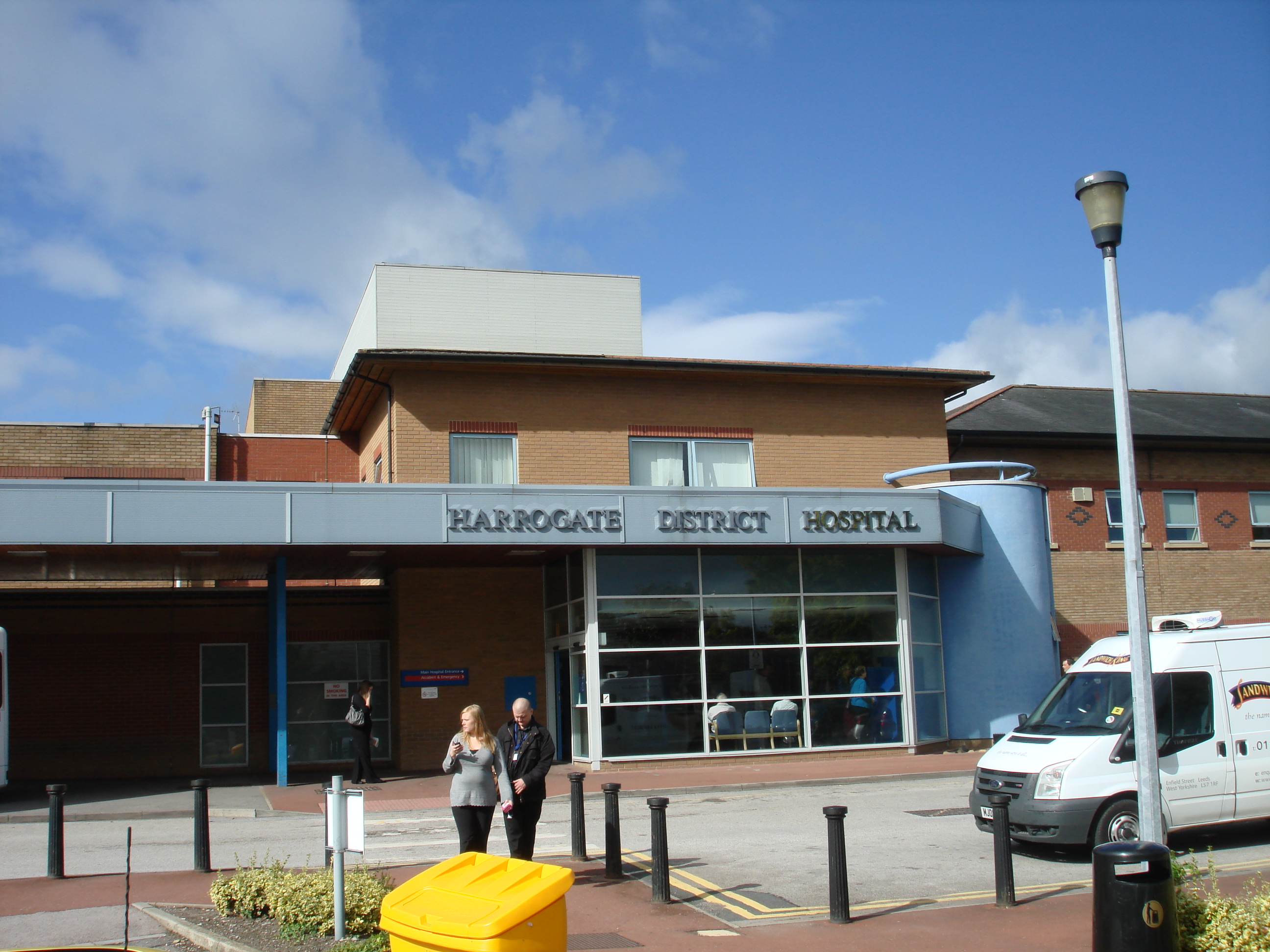
- Harrogate District Hospital

- Shown in North Yorkshire

Geography
- Location: Lancaster Park Road, Harrogate, HG2 7SX, North Yorkshire, England
- Coordinates: 53.99365°N 1.51766°W

Organisation
- Care system: NHS
- Type: District General

Services
- Emergency department: Yes - Trauma Unit

History
- Founded: 1975

Links
- Website: http://www.hdft.nhs.uk
- Lists: Hospitals in England

Harrogate District Hospital is an acute general hospital in Harrogate, North Yorkshire, England. It is managed by Harrogate and District NHS Foundation Trust.

== History ==
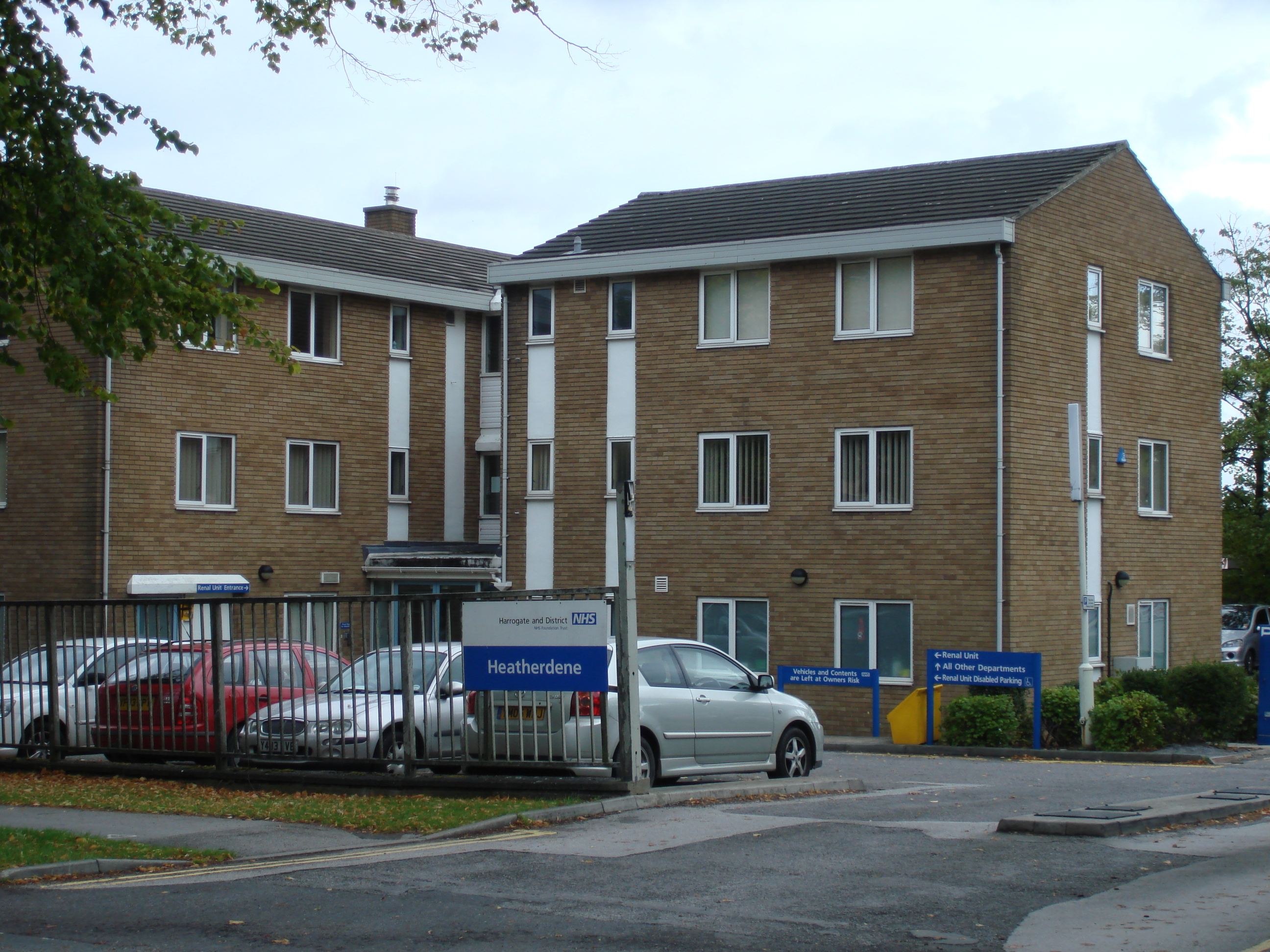
Heatherdene, home of the renal unit, the occupational health unit, the IT department and the GUM clinic

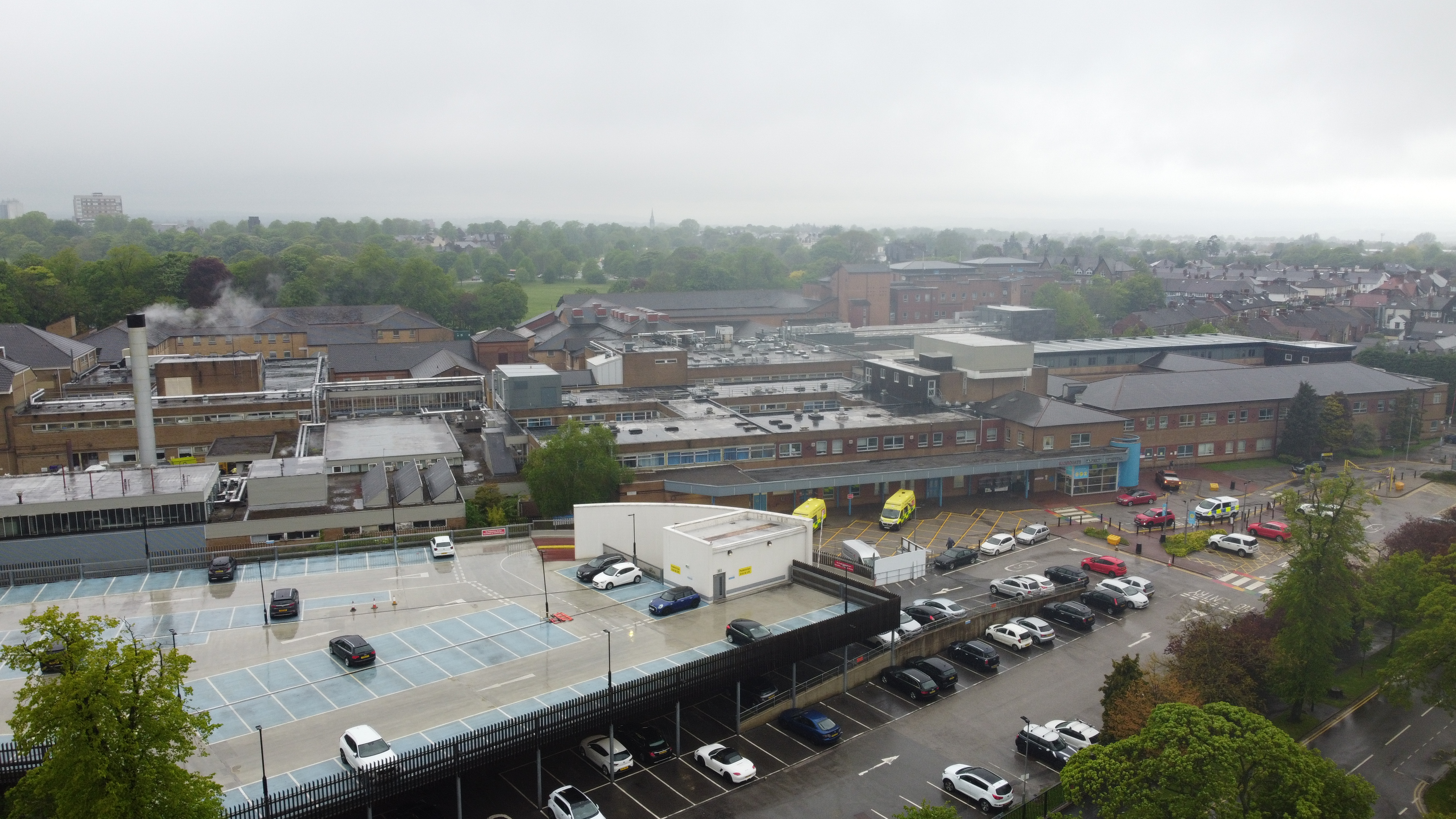
Aerial view of the hospital

The hospital has its origins in the Harrogate General Hospital on Knaresborough Road which was co-founded by Wilfrid Edgecombe who headed the building committee, and completed in 1932. It joined the National Health Service in 1948.

In the 1970s work began to build a modern replacement facility on Lancaster Park Road. The first phase, which consisted of an accident and emergency department, some laboratories and a few wards, was opened by Princess Margaret in January 1975. The second phase – which also accommodated services transferring from the Royal Baths Hospital and the Scotton Hospital as well as several smaller hospitals in the area – was fully completed in 1998. The Queen and the Duke of Edinburgh visited the site later that year to celebrate the completion of the hospital and to conduct the official opening of the Strayside wing.

The Sir Robert Ogden Macmillan Cancer Centre was completed in 2014 and Prince Charles and the Duchess of Cornwall made an official visit to it in 2016.

== Harrogate Hospital Radio ==
The Hospital has a hospital radio station which has won several awards from the Hospital Broadcasting Association.
