= Harrogate and District NHS Foundation Trust =

NHS hospital trust

- Type: NHS hospital trust
- Established: 1 January 2005
- Hospitals: Harrogate District Hospital
- Chair: Sarah Armstrong
- Chief executive: Jonathan Coulter
- Website: www.hdft.nhs.uk

Harrogate and District NHS Foundation Trust runs Harrogate District Hospital, a NHS district general hospital in Harrogate, North Yorkshire, England. The trust was founded on 1 January 2005. It has 12,934 public and 2,322 staff members across Harrogate and District, who are actively involved in running the hospital and maintaining performance. Trust members elect a board of governors who represent the public, the staff and the stakeholder organisations. Sarah Armstrong is the chairman and Jonathan Coulter is the chief executive.

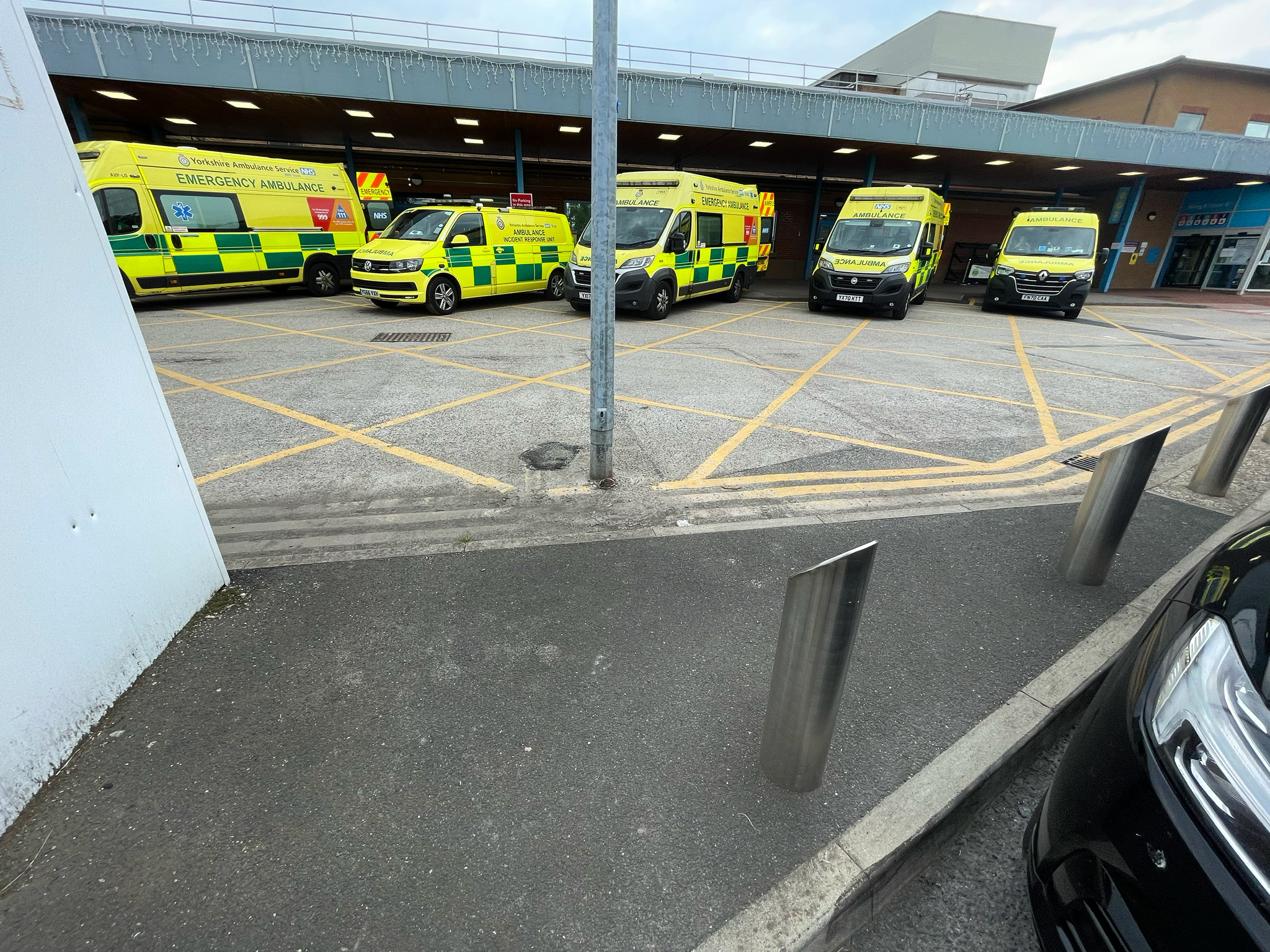
Ambulances waiting outside Harrogate Hospital

== Staffing ==
The hospital is the largest employer in Harrogate employing approximately 2500 staff. Harrogate and District NHS Foundation Trust was rated 'Double Excellent' by the Care Quality Commission for the year 2008-2009. This score covers a range of areas including safety of patients, cleanliness and waiting times. The trust received an 'Excellent' rating in the Patient Environmental Action Team (PEAT) assessment undertaken in 2010. It was named by the Health Service Journal as one of the top hundred NHS trusts to work for in 2015. At that time it had 2911 full-time equivalent staff and a sickness absence rate of 4%. 72% of staff recommend it as a place for treatment and 65% recommended it as a place to work.

In March 2015 the trust awarded a three-year contract to Comensura, based in Luton, a labour supply management specialist, for the supply of medical locums, hoping to reduce the £2.8 million spent on medical agency staff in 2013/14.

In 2017 the trust established a subsidiary company, Harrogate Healthcare Facilities Management Ltd, to which 300 estates and facilities staff were transferred. The intention was to achieve VAT benefits, as well as pay bill savings, by recruiting new staff on less expensive non-NHS contracts. VAT benefits arise because NHS trusts can only claim VAT back on a small subset of goods and services they buy. The Value Added Tax Act 1994 provides a mechanism through which NHS trusts can qualify for refunds on contracted out services.

== CQC rating ==
In November 2018 the Care Quality Commission carried out an inspection, which resulted in an overall score of 'Good' for Harrogate Hospital, it scored 'Outstanding' for caring however scored as 'Requires Improvement' for safe.

== See also ==
- List of hospitals in England
- List of NHS trusts
