= Wilfrid Edgecombe =

British physician (1871–1963)

Wilfrid Edgecombe FRCS, FRCP
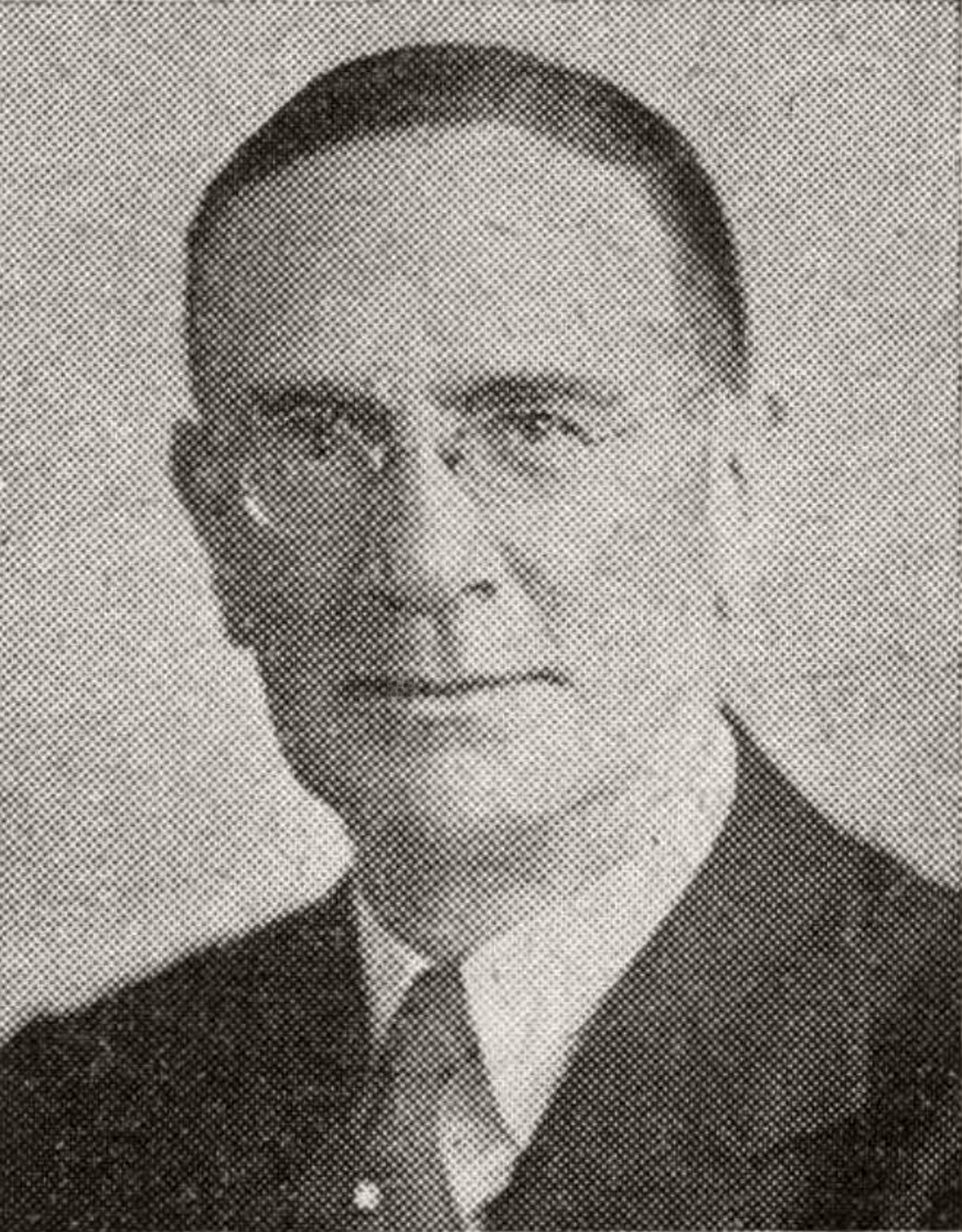
- Edgecombe in the 1920s
- Born: 2 March 1871; Huyton, Merseyside, England
- Died: 7 April 1963 (aged 92); Harrogate, West Riding of Yorkshire, England
- Education: University of Liverpool; University College London
- Occupations: Surgeon; consultant physician; general practitioner; Spa doctor; RAMC captain; writer

Signature
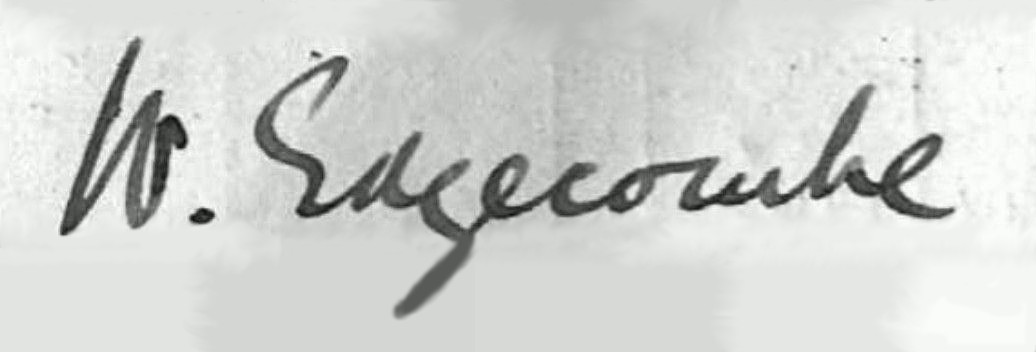

Wilfrid Edgecombe (2 March 1871 – 7 April 1963) was an English surgeon and spa physician. He was initially employed as a house doctor and surgical tutor at Liverpool Royal Infirmary, but for most of his career he was involved with the management of Harrogate Infirmary and with the founding of Harrogate District Hospital. As deputy president of that establishment, he steered its transition from a private institution to a National Health Service hospital. He travelled around Britain's medical schools, giving promotional lectures on the subject of spa treatments. Alongside Henry Simson, he attended the birth of Gerald David Lascelles, the second child of Mary, Princess Royal and Countess of Harewood, with Simson and himself receiving media exposure as the first to announce the birth. He served as a captain in the Royal Army Medical Corps during the First World War, and he served as a councillor on Harrogate Town Council.

One of thirteen children of a Huyton fruit broker, Edgecombe became a Fellow of the Royal College of Surgeons and a Fellow of the Royal College of Physicians. He was the Yorkshire branch president of the British Medical Association, president of Harrogate Medical Society, and president of the Leeds and West Riding Medico-Chirurgical Society. He was a forthright speaker who promoted British spa treatments. He published a number of journal articles and a book on medical matters including spa treatment. He wrote a history of Harrogate District Hospital, a poetry book and, towards the end of his life, a book of quotations from literature on the subject of old age. He was a keen winter sportsman, travelling annually to St. Moritz to take part in skating and curling, and he captained Harrogate Golf Club.

== Background ==
Edgecombe's immediate paternal ancestors were agricultural labourers in Devon. However some of his own generation in the family achieved professional status via education in the Merseyside area. His paternal grandfather, John Edgecombe, (Note: John Edgecombe (Modbury 5 October 1783 – Kingsbridge 1853).) was an agricultural labourer in Aveton Gifford, Devon. His father was George Edgecombe, (Note: George Edgecombe (Aveton Gifford, Devon 18 October 1829 – West Derby, 12 July 1899). GRO index: Deaths Sep 1899 Edgecombe George 69 W. Derby 8b 243. Buried in St Bartholomew's Churchyard, Roby, Merseyside.) an agricultural labourer and farm servant, born in Aveton Gifford. He then became a fruit broker in the firm Pell & Edgecombe, which was later run by his son George Wolton Edgecombe. On 14 July 1860 he married Fanny Maria Edgecombe (née Hughman). (Note: Fanny Maria (or Marrin) Edgecombe née Hughman (Yoxford c.1836 – 18 August 1905). GRO index: Marriages Sep 1860 Hughman Fanny Maria and Edgecombe George, Hampstead 1a 1054. Deaths Sep 1905 Edgecombe Fanny M. 69 W Derby 8b 189 or 1_3. She was buried in St Bartholomew's Churchyard, Roby, Merseyside.) They lived at Belle View Villa in Huyton, and the Uplands, Blundellsands, in Crosby, Merseyside, and had thirteen children. (Note: The thirteen children of George and Fanny M. Edgecombe: Edith Harriet Edgecombe (1861–1946), Janet Edgecombe (1862–1948), George Robert Edgecombe (1866–1946), Henry Herbert Edgecombe (1867–1940), Edward Chorley Edgecombe (1868–1944), Frank Wolton Edgecombe (1869–1914), Wilfrid Edgecombe (1871–1963), Helen Mary Edgecombe (1872–1961), Fanny Augusta Edgecombe (1873–1951), Arthur Edgecombe (1875–1929), Alfred Luxton Edgecombe (1877–1952), Walter Russell Edgecombe (1879–1945), Ethel Alice Edgecombe (1880–1946). GRO index: Births Jun 1861 Edgecombe Edith Harriet Hampstead 1a 544. Deaths Sep 1946 Edgecombe Edith H. 86 Newton A 7a 413. Births Sep 1862 Edgecomb Janet Hampstead 1a 503. Marriages Jun 1882 Edgecombe Janet and Potter William. West Derby 8b 607. Deaths Jun 1948 Potter Janet 85 Ross 9a 70. Births Sep 1865 Edgecombe George Robert Prescot 8b 549. Deaths Mar 1865 Edgecombe George Prescot 8b 536. Births Mar 1867 Edgecombe Henry Herbert Prescott 8b 594. Deaths Dec 1940 Edgecombe Henry H. 73 Crosby 8b 1127. Births Sep 1868 Edgecombe Edward Chorley Prescott 8b 557. Deaths Dec 1944 Edgecombe Edward C. 76 Crosby 8b 582. Births Sep 1869 Edgecombe Frank Wolton Prescott 8b 547. Deaths Dec 1914 Edgecombe Frank W. 45 W.Derby 8b 383. Births Jun 1872 Edgecombe Helen Mary Prescot 8b 604. (Married in Mexico). Deaths Sep 1961 Bennett Helen M. 89 Maidstone 5b 547. Births Mar 1874 Edgecombe Fanny Augusta W. Derby 8b 489. Marriages Dec 1901 Edgecombe Fanny Augusta and Robert Marshall Going. W. Derby 8b 495. Deaths Mar 1951 Going Fanny A. 77 Tonbridge 5b 1304. Births Sep 1875 Edgecombe Arthur W. Derby 8b 482. (Died in France, 1929). Births Sep 1877 Edgecombe Alfred W. Derby 8B 500. Deaths Dec 1952 Edgecombe Alfred L. 75 Kensington 5c 1370. Births Mar 1879 Edgecombe Walter Russell W. Derby 8b 529. Deaths Dec 1945 Edgecombe Walter R. 65 Salisbury 5a 164. Births Sep 1880 Edgecombe Ethel Alice W. Derby 8b 511. Marriages Jun 1928 Edgecumbe Ethel A. and Lines Theodore Herbert. Marylebone 1a 1392. Deaths Mar 1946 Lines Ethel A. 64 Marylebone 1a 614.)

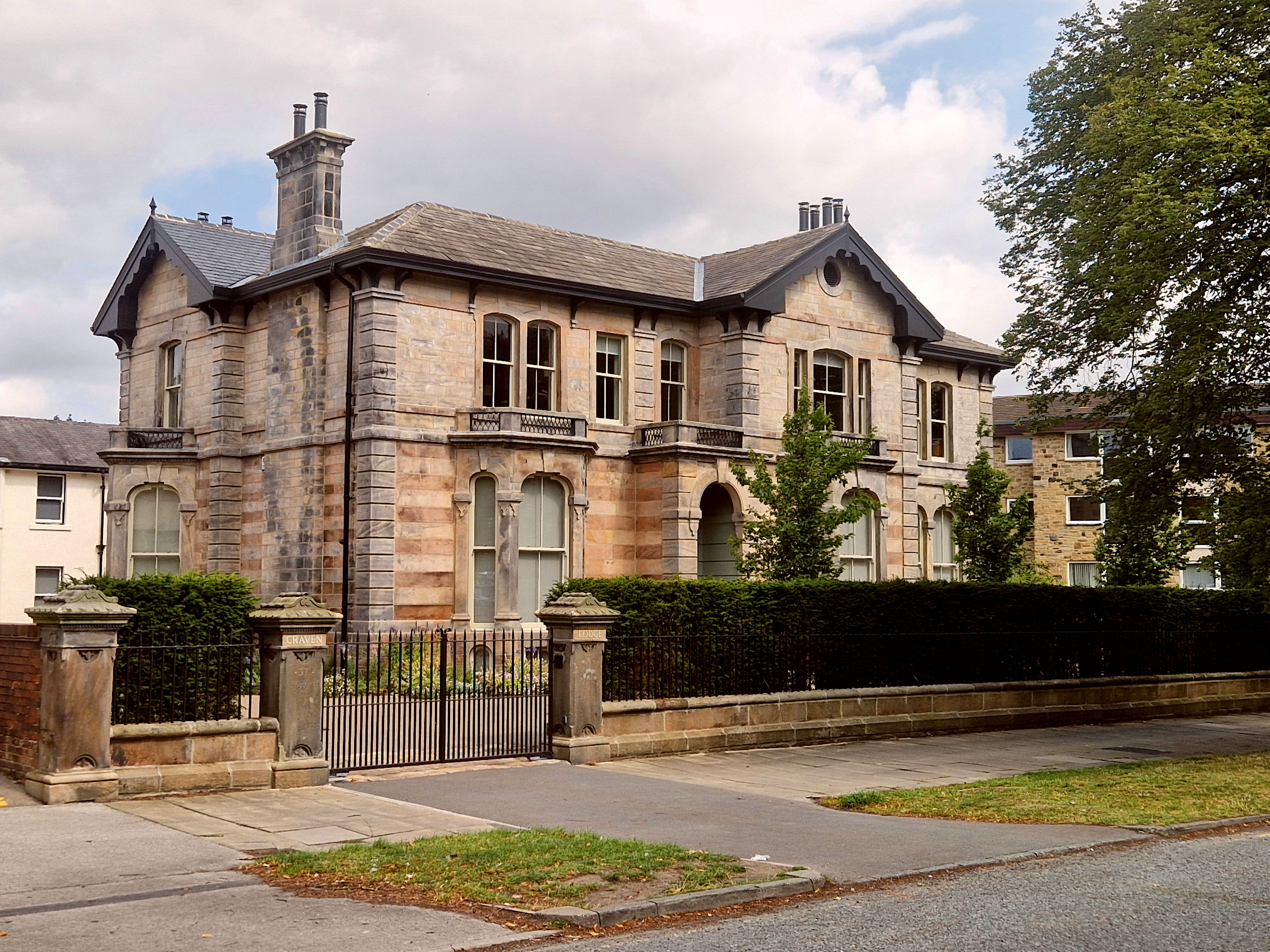
Edgecombe's villa, Craven Lodge

Edgecombe was born in Huyton in Merseyside, (Note: Wilfried Edgecombe (Huyton 2 March 1871 – Harrogate 7 April 1963). GRO index: Births Jun 1871 Edgecombe Wilfrid Prescott 8b 541. Deaths Jun 1963 Edgecombe Wilfrid 92 Claro 2C 76.) his parents' seventh child and fifth son. By 1881 he was boarding at Cambridge House School, Cambridge Road, Litherland, with his brothers Edward and Frank. In 1891 the census finds him as a medical student, at home with his parents and eight of his siblings, including his brother Edward, a solicitor, at Burbo Bank North, in Great Crosby, Merseyside.

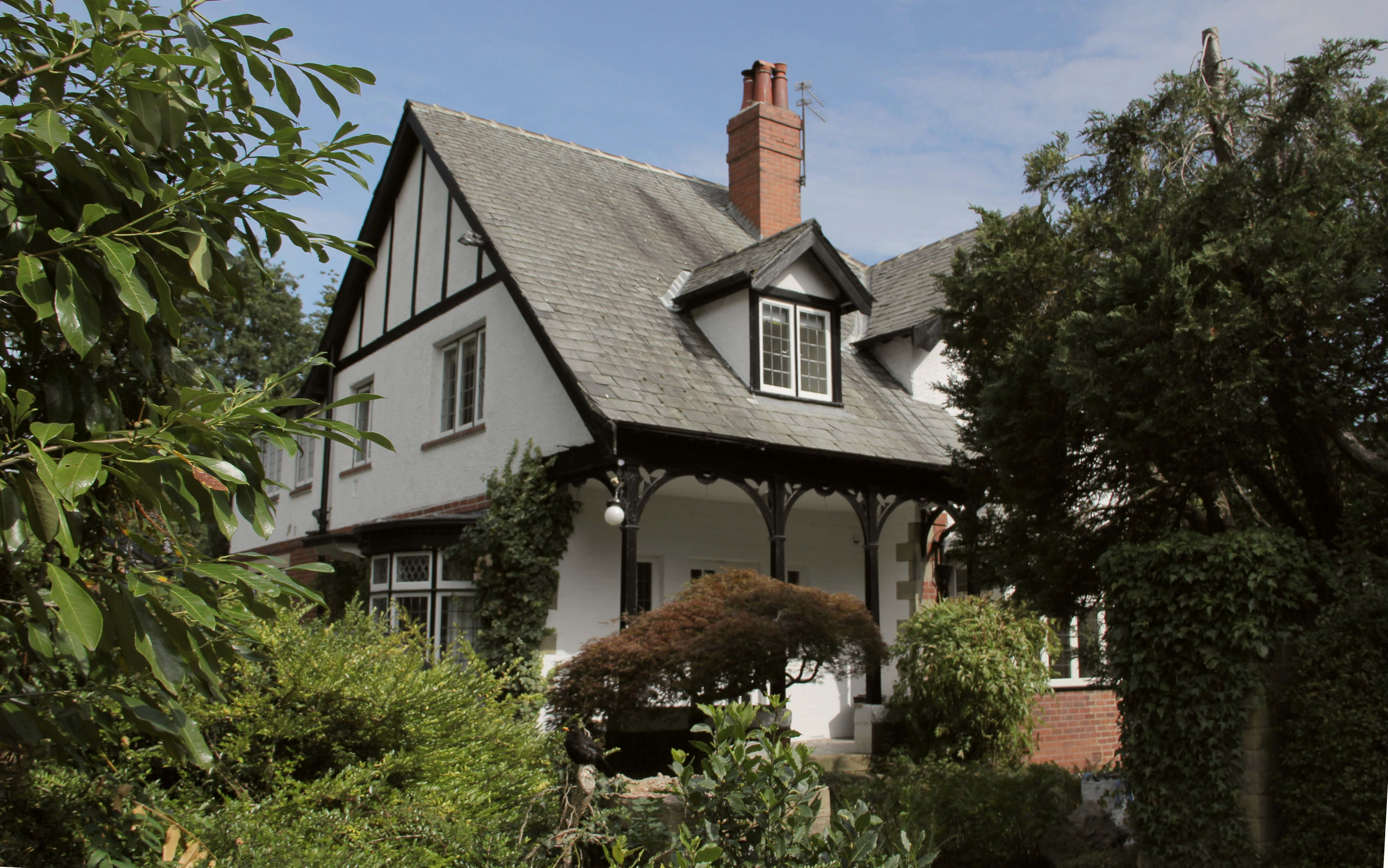
Edgecombe's home in Leadhall Lane

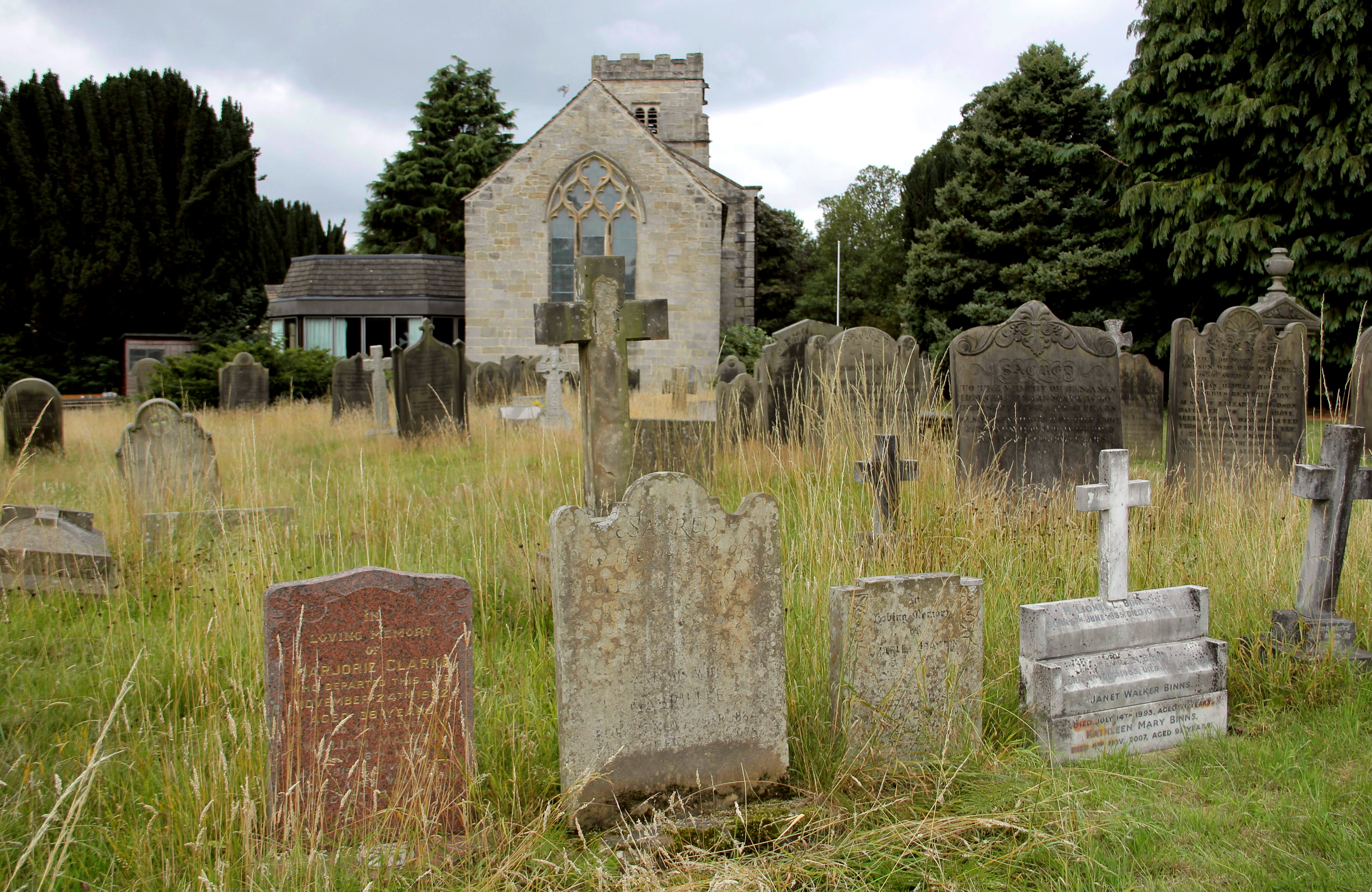
Edgecombe's gravestone (bottom centre)

Edgecombe had two daughters and two sons, by his first marriage on 13 January 1897 to Jane Swinburne of Workington, Cumberland. (Note: Jane Edgecombe née Swinburne or Swinburn (Workington 31 October 1868 – Harrogate 30 October 1939). GRO index: Births Dec 1868 Swinburn Jane Cockermouth 10b 519. Marriages Mar 1897 Edgecombe Wilfrid and Swinburne Jane, Knaresbro' 9a 127. Deaths Dec 1939 Edgecombe Jane 71 Knaresbro' 9a 349.) She was the daughter of landowner John Fawcett Swinburne. His elder daughter was doctor Dorothy Minna Edgecombe, (Note: Dorothy Minna Anning/Rutherford née Edgecombe (14 November 1898 – 1981) She married twice. GRO index: Births Dec 1898 Edgecombe Dorothy Minna Knaresbro' 9a 109. Marriages Dec 1924 Edgecombe Dorothy M. and Anning Charles Clifford Paul. Knaresbro' 9a 197. Marriages Dec 1932 Edgecombe Dorothy M. and Rutherford, Raphael Perlee James. Knaresbro 9a 209. Deaths Jun 1981 Rutherford Dorothy Minna 14 NO 1898 Sheffield 3 1376.) who had a Bachelor of Medicine, Bachelor of Surgery degree, from the University of Leeds, and whose second marriage was to doctor Raphael Perlee James Rutherford, brother of Kathleen Rutherford. His younger daughter was magistrate Joan Edgecombe, (Note: Joan Edgecombe (Harrogate 2 December 1904 – Harrogate 30 October 1987). GRO index: Births Dec 1904 Edgecombe Joan Knaresbro' 9a 108. Deaths 1987 Edgecombe Joan 02 De 1904 Claro 2 2168.) director of music at the former Belmont School, 11 Queen Parade, Harrogate, from 1928. His two sons were Paul Swinburne Edgecombe, (Note: Paul Swinburne Edgecombe (28 November 1909 – 1987). GRO index: Births Dec 1909 Edgecombe Paul Swinburne Knaresbro 9a 103.) a Royal Naval surgeon captain, and Midshipman Arthur Wilfrid Edgecombe, (Note: Arthur Wilfrid Edgecombe (Knaresborough 28 June 1901 – HMS Verulam 3 September 1919). GRO index: Births Sep 1901 Edgecombe Arthur Wilfrid Knaresbro' 9a 104. Killed in action in the Baltic Sea, 1919.) who was killed in action on HMS Verulam during the First World War. In 1901 Edgecombe and his wife Jane were living with their two-year-old daughter Dorothy and three servants at 102 Station Parade, Harrogate, and then 2 Royal Villas. Between at least 1909 and at least 1932 the family was living above Edgecombe's surgery at 17 Victoria Avenue, Harrogate, with three servants and a governess in 1911, and their two daughters and three servants in 1921. By 1932 the family was living at Craven Lodge, 101 Victoria Avenue, while possibly retaining no. 17, which held the surgery.

Edgecombe's first wife Jane died of pneumonia on 30 October 1939, at Craven Lodge. She was cremated at Harrogate Crematorium. On 18 October 1945 at St Mary's Church, Hawksworth, Leeds, he remarried to Gabrielle Helen Holgate Butler, (Note: Gabrielle Helen Holgate Edgecombe née Butler (17 November 1884 – 3 December 1975). GRO index: Marriages Dec 1945 Butler Gabrielle H.H. and Edgecombe Wilfrid, Leeds 9b 623. Deaths Dec 1975 Edgecombe Gabrielle Helen H. 17 NO 1884 Claro 2 2106.) daughter of Hugh Myddleton Butler of Kirkstall, Leeds. From 1945 they were living at 122 Leadhall Lane, Harrogate. Gabrielle outlived him.

Edgecombe died at home at Rossett Oaks, 122 Leadhall Lane, (Note: 122 Leadhall Lane, Harrogate, formerly 120 Leadhall Lane, on the corner of Leadhall Lane and Leadhall Road.) in Harrogate on 7 April 1963. He left £151,144 19s. 1d. (equivalent to £2,760,675.03 in 2025).

== Career ==
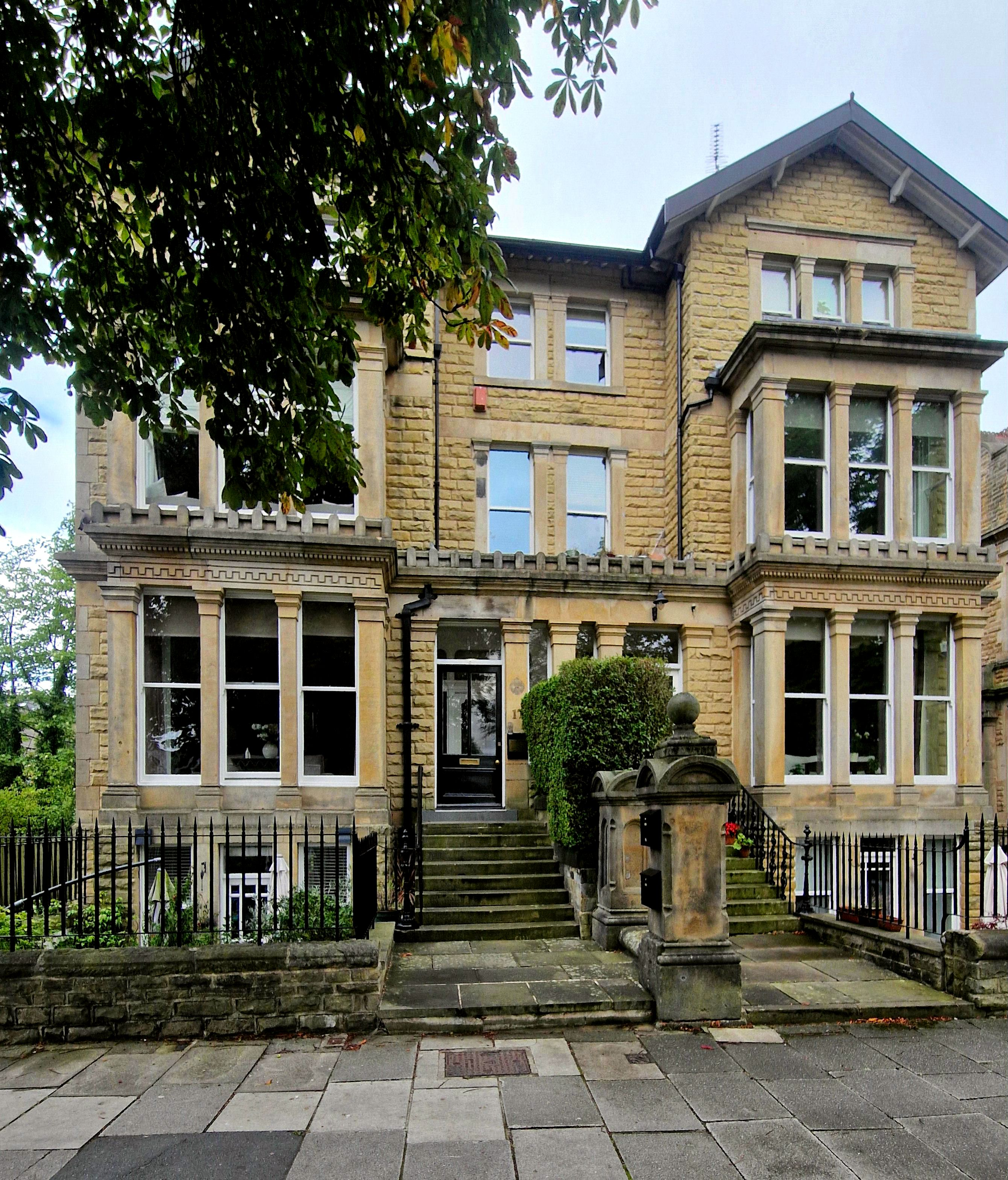
17 Victoria Avenue (left), Edgecombe's home and surgery

Edgecombe read medicine at the medical school of the University College of Liverpool, where he studied alongside John Hay. Because Liverpool University was not yet authorised to grant degrees, he then continued his studies and qualified at University College London. He received his Bachelor of Medicine, Bachelor of Surgery (MB, BS) degree in 1893, and on 9 February of that year became a Member of the Royal College of Surgeons (MRCS). The Ballymena Telegraph described him as, "the popular Harrogate practitioner, who is an authority on the water baths and climate of the Yorkshire Spa".

=== Bedside manner ===
Around 1951, inspired by Cato Maior de Senectute, Edgecombe published de Senectute. It includes a comment about his own attitude as a medical consultant towards his anxious patients.

I have been struck by the large number [of patients] who make their lives a misery to themselves and a burden to others from the habit, ingrained or acquired, of worrying unnecessarily over trifles. They lack the philosophy to realise that a large percentage of their worries are of their own making, and the remainder not worth worrying about! Worry over the past, and anxiety for the future, prevents concentration on the present. After all, the great secret of happiness in this life is just to have a little more to do in the day than one can do comfortably.

=== Infirmaries and the First World War ===
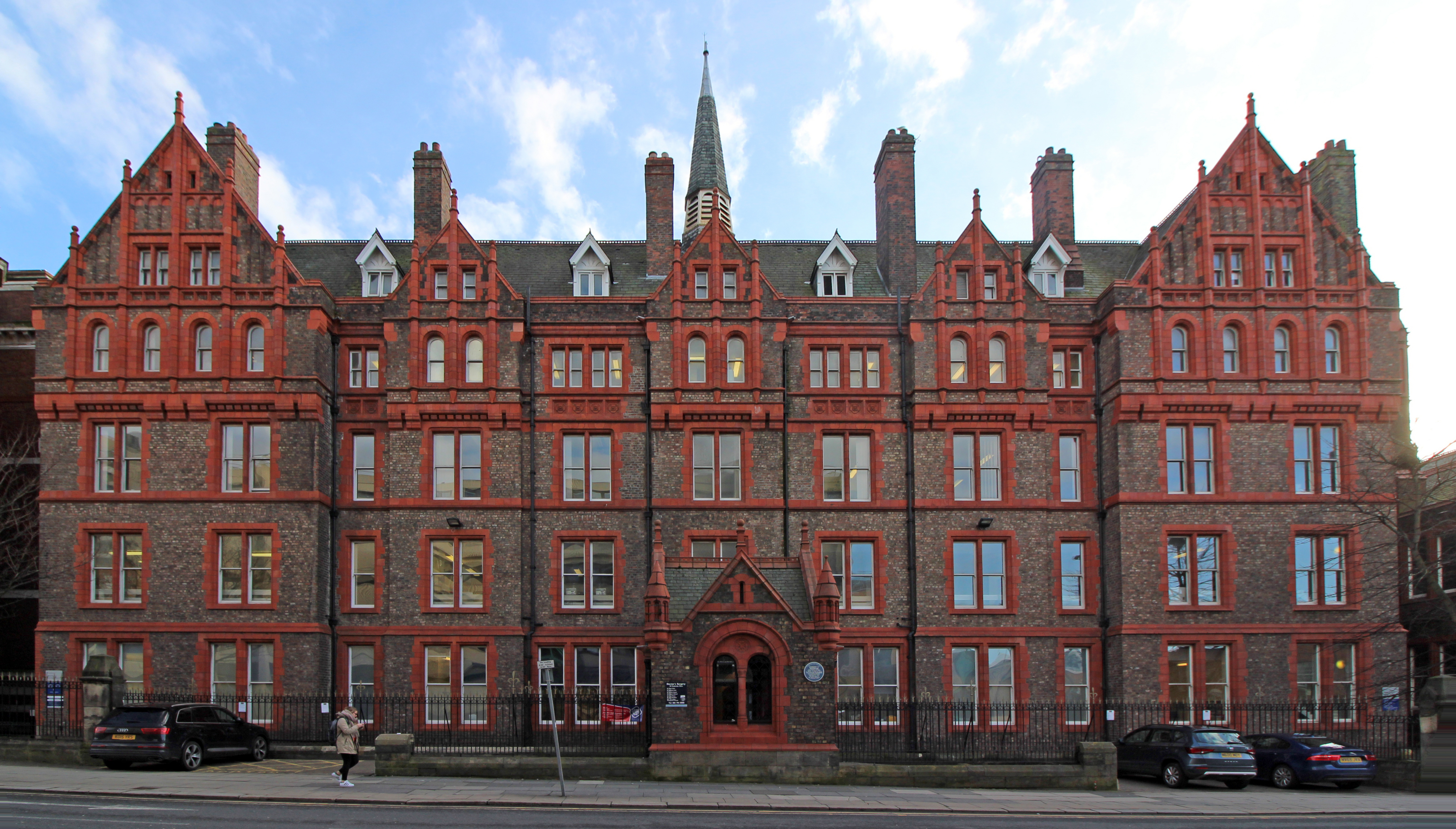
Liverpool Infirmary

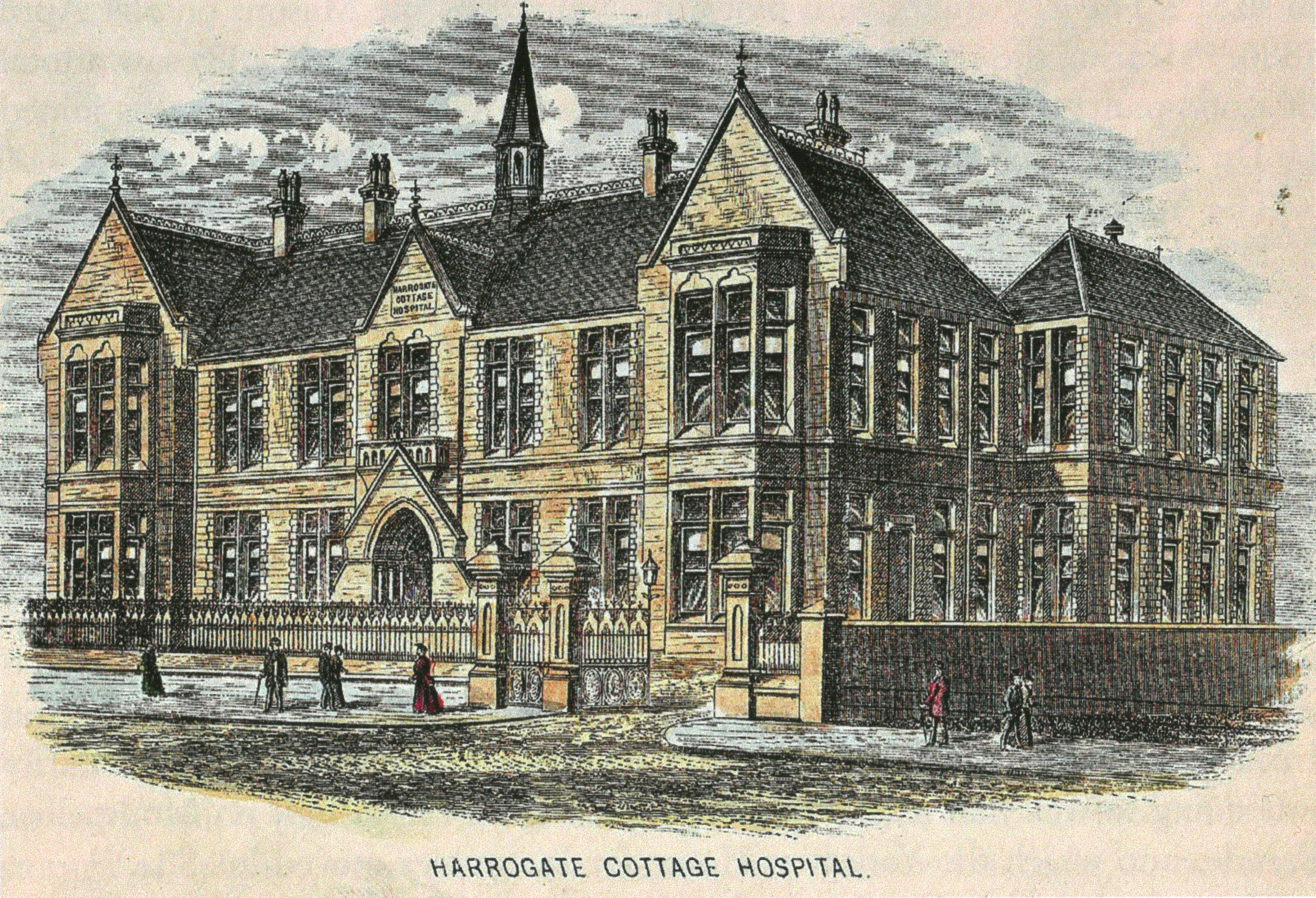
Harrogate Infirmary, in 1883

In 1893 Edgecombe was employed as a house doctor at Liverpool Infirmary. Around that time he was also a surgical tutor and a demonstrator in anatomy. In November 1894 he moved to Harrogate. On 12 March 1896, being interested in surgery, he qualified as a Fellow of the Royal College of Surgeons (FRCS). At this point he came under the influence of George Oliver and was "profoundly affected" (Note: "Profoundly affected": see original BMJ obituary via Jstor.) by his physiological research. He began to concentrate on medical practice, and qualified as a Doctor of Medicine (MD) in 1895. He ceased to concentrate on surgery. In 1907 he qualified as a Member of the Royal College of Physicians (MRCP). By 1916 he was a consultant physician and his spa practice and his general practice had become "extensive". (Note: "Extensive": see original BMJ obituary via Jstor.) In 1916 he worked briefly in a heart unit in Colchester; thereafter he worked only as a consultant. In 1926 he was elected a Fellow of the Royal College of Physicians (FRCP). In that era, few men had become both FRCS and FRCP.

From 1905, and for most of the rest of his career, Edgecome concentrated on the development of Harrogate's general hospital services. In that year he was employed by the small Harrogate Infirmary, which remained limited in capacity even after it had gained 55 more beds. In 1911, Edgecombe was working from home at 17 Victoria Avenue, Harrogate, where he had a general practice surgery. During the First World War, Edgecombe served as a captain in the Royal Army Medical Corps (RAMC). By 1919 Edgecombe was petitioning the hospital governors to build a new, larger, hospital on Harrogate's outskirts. His efforts kick-started plans for the Harrogate and District General Hospital, with himself as chairman of the building committee.

=== Harrogate and District General Hospital ===
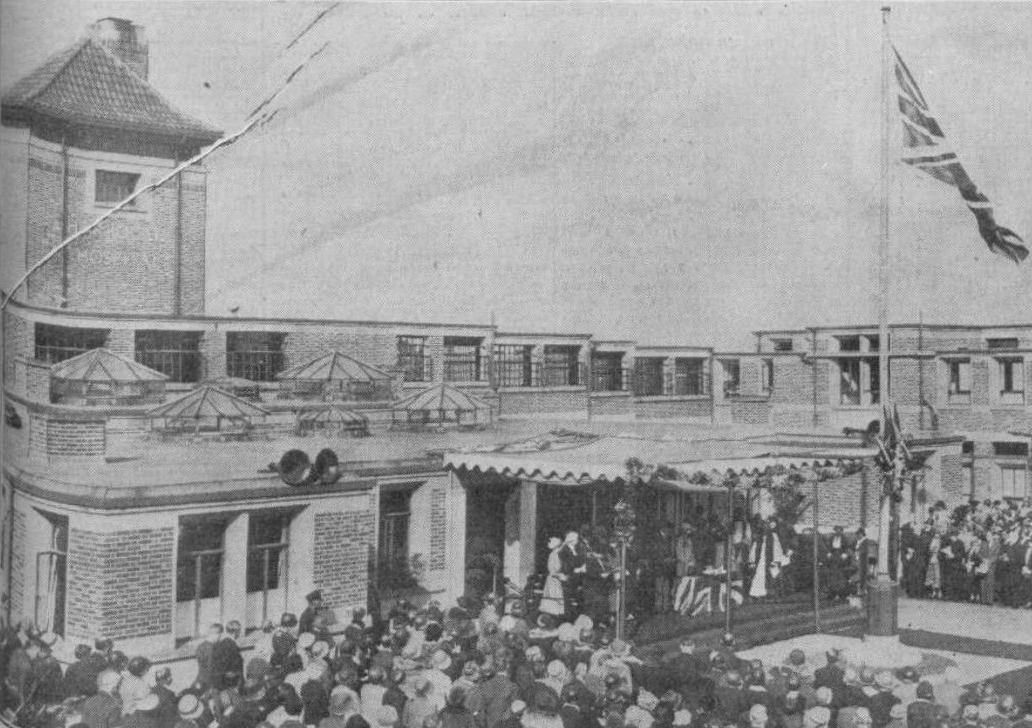
Harrogate District Hospital opened by the Princess Royal, 1932

The new building was opened on 19 September 1932 by Mary, Princess Royal and Countess of Harewood, as the Harrogate and District General Hospital on Knaresborough Road. The Princess Royal was a previous patient of Edgecombe's; he had attended her daily at Goldsborough Hall in the last four days of her 1924 pregnancy. He and Henry Simson were the first to announce publicly the birth of the child, Gerald David Lascelles, Edgecombe's name being repeated in many newspapers, such as The Inverness Courier, The London Evening News, The Daily Express, The Daily News, and The Warder and Dublin Weekly Mail.

Edgecombe was chairman of the medical staff of the hospital (now known as Harrogate District Hospital) for thirteen years, and retired as an active physician there in 1936, although he retained strong interest and influence in the establishment. As chairman of its hospital contributory scheme committee in 1946 he was forthright in his approach to the imminent government takeover of British hospitals:

We are in the position of the prisoner in the dock awaiting the verdict and sentence ... If the voluntary hospitals are entirely taken over by the Government, and I cannot conceive of a more crass piece of stupidity, then it means the death of the contributory scheme.

The hospital moved from private ownership to state control under the National Health Service. The Princess Royal became president of the hospital, and Edgecombe was elected deputy president, chairman of the no.1 house committee and subsequently a member of the management committee which took over on 5 July 1948. He retired from those duties in 1959. The British Medical Journal said, "His skilful chairmanship and wise judgement did much to ensure that the change to State control passed off smoothly and to the best advantage of all concerned".

=== Royal Baths Hospital ===
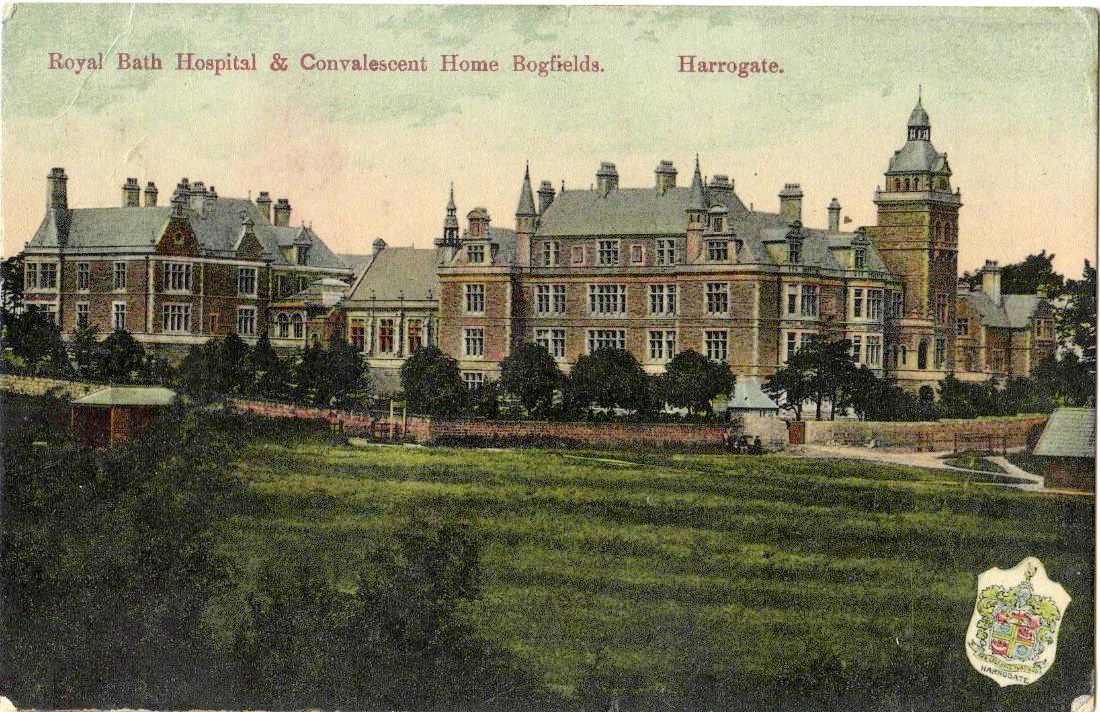
Royal Baths Hospital in 1907

Edgecombe was in principle supportive of British spas. In 1899 he wrote to the journal, Nature, declaring that not only could British spas equal the variety of treatments offered in other countries, but the bracing climate and freedom from the distractions of home at British spas were conducive to the success of those treatments.

As a representative of Harrogate Medical Society, Edgecombe was a witness in a 1937 Ministry of Health enquiry regarding the Royal Baths Hospital, Harrogate. He supported an application on behalf of 104 doctors who "had been recommending better accommodation and greater efficiency of treatments at the Baths for the past ten years". Explaining their reasons, he said:

There was lamentable congestion in some departments ... In some cases several treatments were given in the same room, and this resulted in overcrowding, overheating, and lack of privacy. Patients were hurried out of dressing rooms prematurely because of inadequate accommodation ... If he had the power he would raze the whole of the buildings to the ground and start afresh.

== Institutions ==
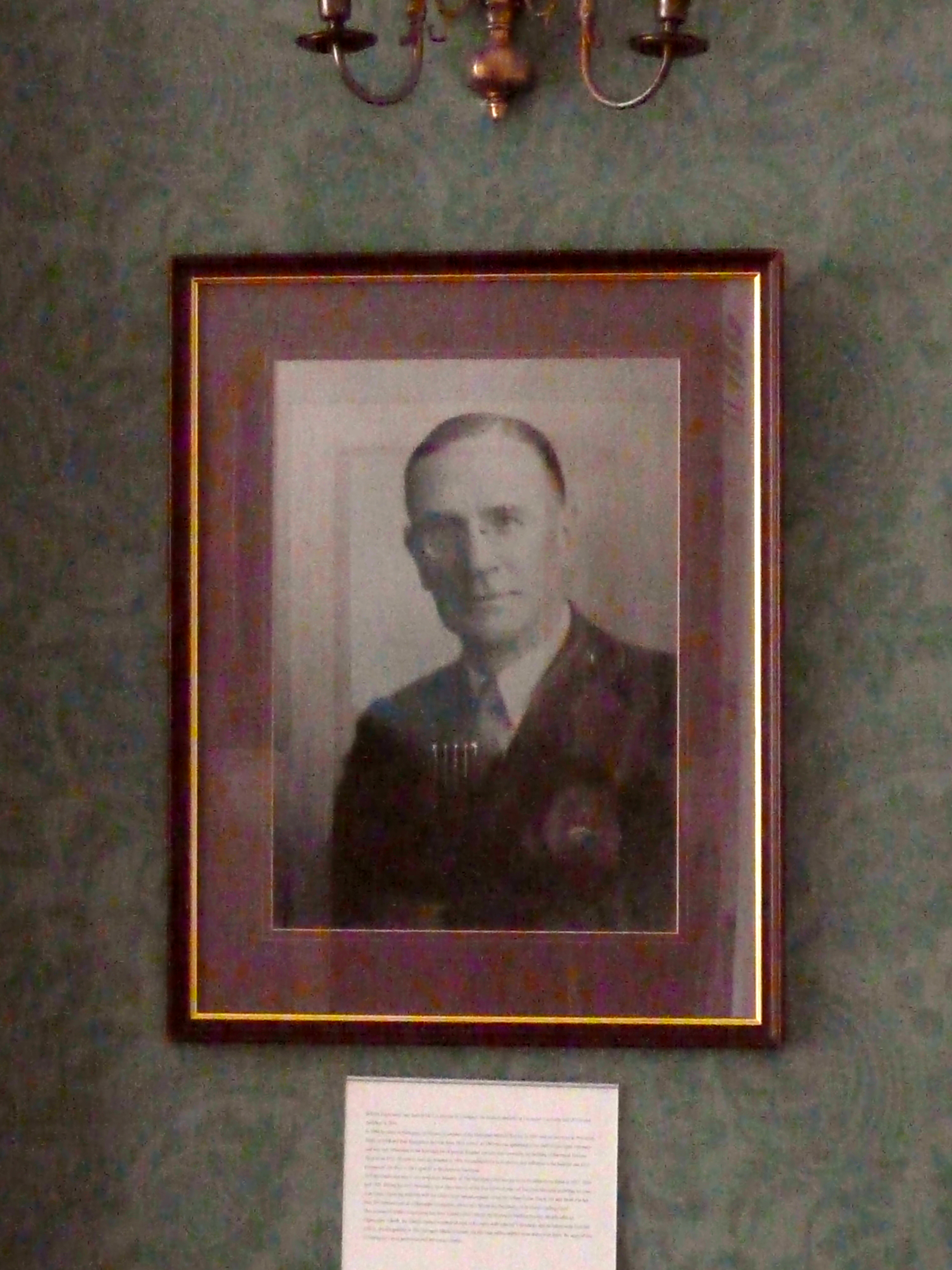
Photo of Edgecombe in The Harrogate Club

Between 1919 and 1932, Edgecombe served for thirteen years as a councillor on Harrogate Town Council. He was one of those instrumental in forming the liaison committee which aligned the Harrogate Medical Society and the corporation. He served on the liaison committee for many years, in support of the spa element of the town. Around 1926, and based on his own research work, Edgecombe gave a series of lectures on medical hydrology and spa treatment in the medical schools of Britain. He was attempting at the same time to attract the attention of universities with respect to those subjects or, as Lord Cohen of Birkenhead put it, "in the hope of rekindling the fast-dying embers of Harrogate's earlier fame in the treatment of rheumatic and digestive disorders". According to Richard R. Trail, Edgecombe was "perhaps the last of the spa physicians".

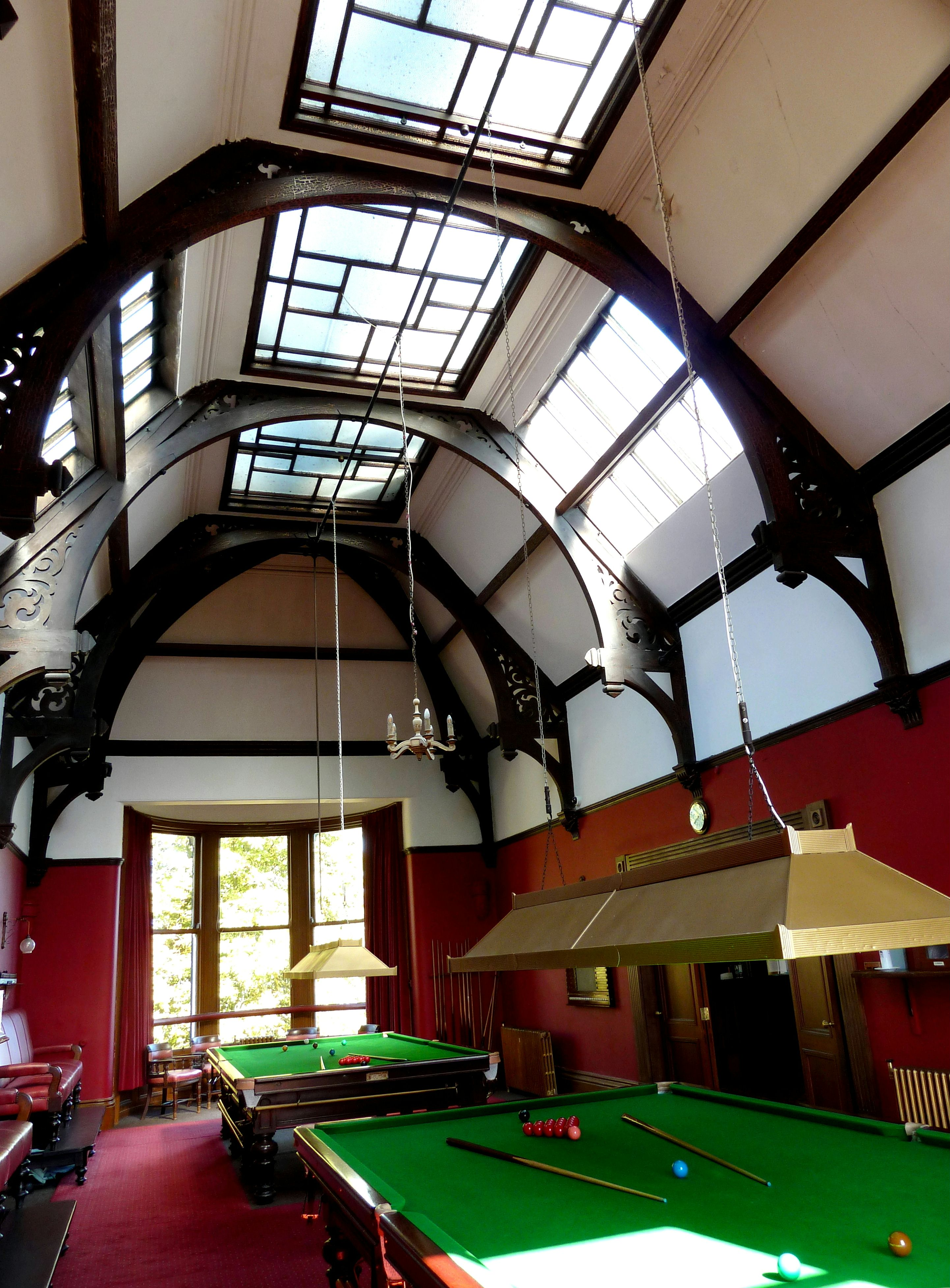
Where Edgecombe lost to Conan Doyle at billiards

In 1893 Edgecombe became a member of the British Medical Association, and in 1918 was elected as its Yorkshire branch president. From 1895 he was a member of Harrogate Medical Society, of which he was president in 1905 and 1939. The Ripon Gazette described him as "the doyen of the Harrogate Medical Society". Unusually for a Harrogate doctor, he was elected president of the Leeds and West Riding Medico-Chirurgical Society. He was closely involved with The Harrogate Club for many years. He acted as its honorary secretary and treasurer from 1905 to 1907, and was thrice president of the club, in 1912, 1954 and 1957. While there, he lost several games of billiards with Arthur Conan Doyle.

== Other interests ==
In his youth Edgecombe was an "enthusiastic" skater, joining curling and skating teams at St. Moritz and once captaining the English team. In 1906, being a "keen" golfer, he captained the Harrogate Golf Club. However his favourite sport was curling, at which he won prizes for himself and for his team. He was also a traveller. In the winter of 1949–1950, Edgecombe and his second wife travelled first-class on the Royal Mail Lines ship Andes to Buenos Aires, returning on 26 February.

Edgecombe wrote poetry, especially Christmas poems which he shared with his friends. Many of those poems were published in The Alpine Post, Punch and other papers. In 1914 Edgecombe published those and some hitherto unpublished poems in his book, A Mixed Grill. In his latter years he concentrated on his garden at 122 Leadhall Lane, especially the culture of roses, and he and his wife hosted parties there. He was also a card player, taking it seriously enough to write a letter to The Spectator when an apparent record occurred when playing a private game of piquet.

== Obituaries ==
The British Medical Journal commented in 1963:

Dr Edgecombe served his hospital with an unselfishness and singleness of purpose which was outstanding. A brilliant clinician who never lost sight of the personal problem, he also became a skilful administrator. Even to the end of his long life he loved hearing of the welfare of his hospital ... Essentially a kind and friendly person, he loved to entertain his friends and it was as host on these informal occasions that his great personal charm was seen to best advantage.

In 1965, Lord Cohen of Birkenhead described Edgecombe as, "an outstanding physician, and one of Harrogate's most loyal and devoted citizens ... a man with such versatile gifts of mind and character, which were used for so long in the service of his fellows".

== Legacy ==
Soon after Edgecombe's death in 1963, an endowment from his widow and donations from members of Harrogate Medical Society (HMS) paid for a memorial trust. Thus was founded the annual Edgecombe Lecture. The inaugural lecture was delivered on 11 March 1964 to HMS by Lord Cohen of Birkenhead. Together with HMS, the trust also funds the Wilfrid Edgecombe Award which provides prizes for the best papers submitted by resident doctors (specifically foundation year doctors and core trainees) working in the Harrogate area.

== Publications ==
This list is in date order, and may not be complete.

=== Medicine ===
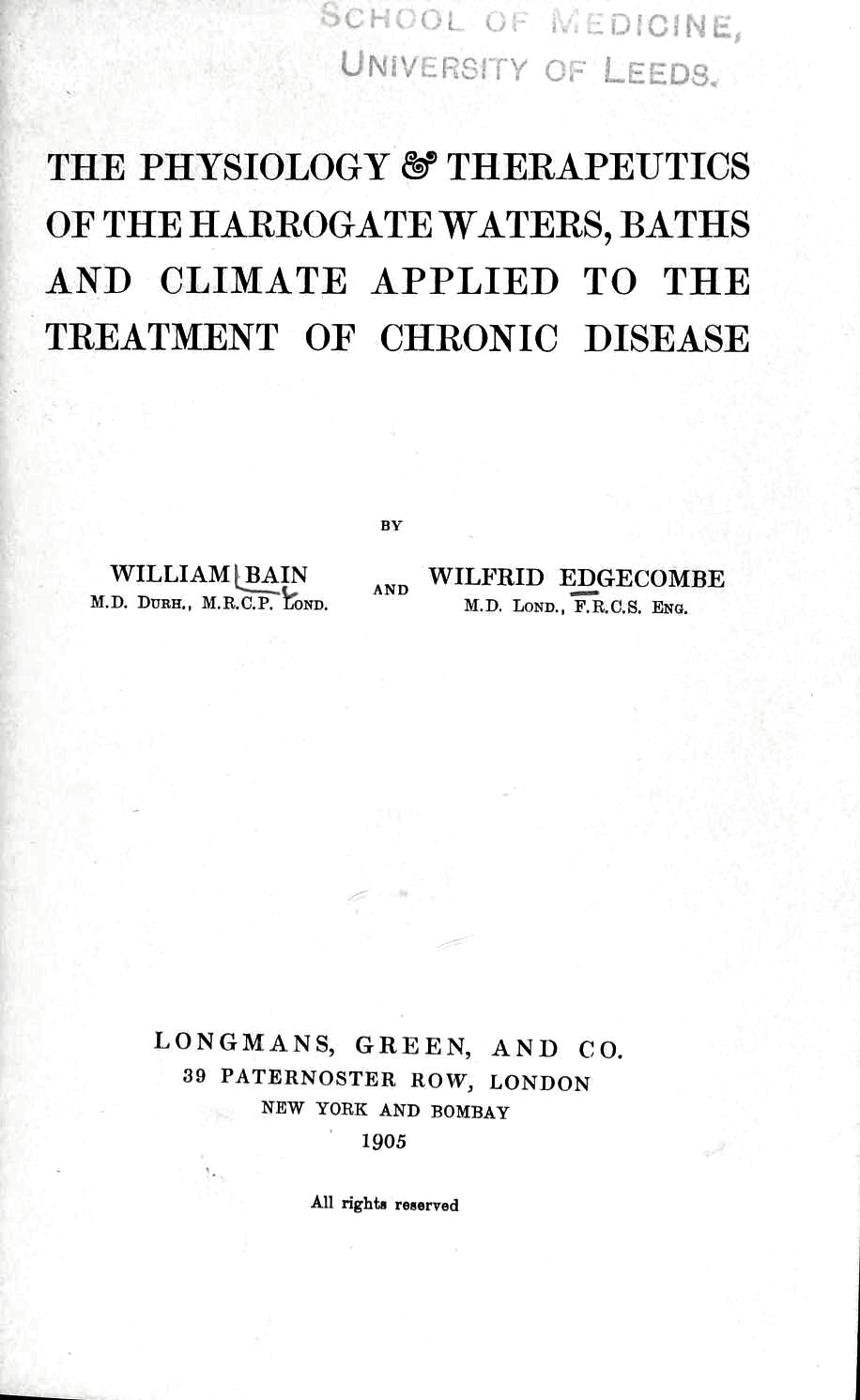
Title page of The Physiology (1905)

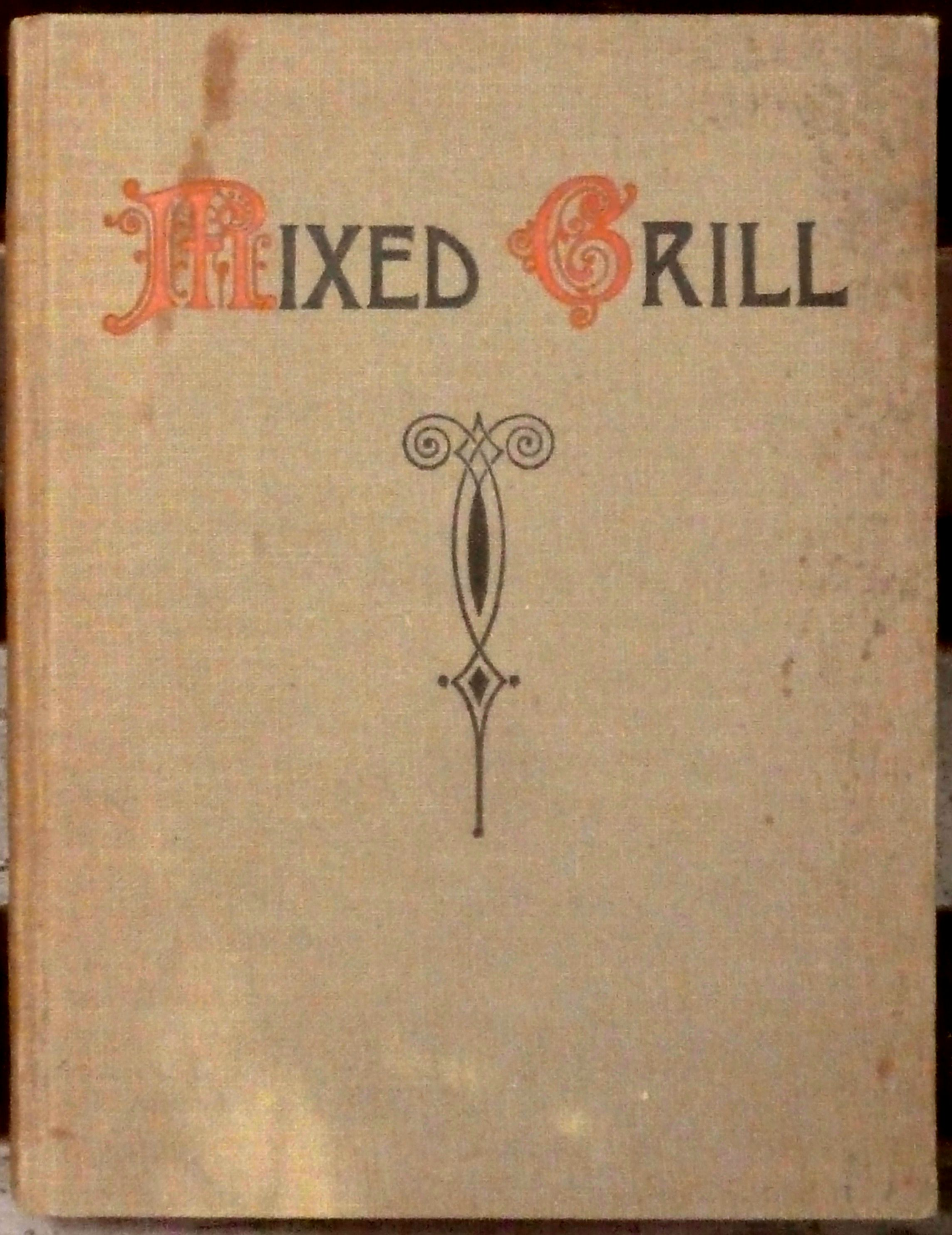
Cover of Mixed Grill (1914)

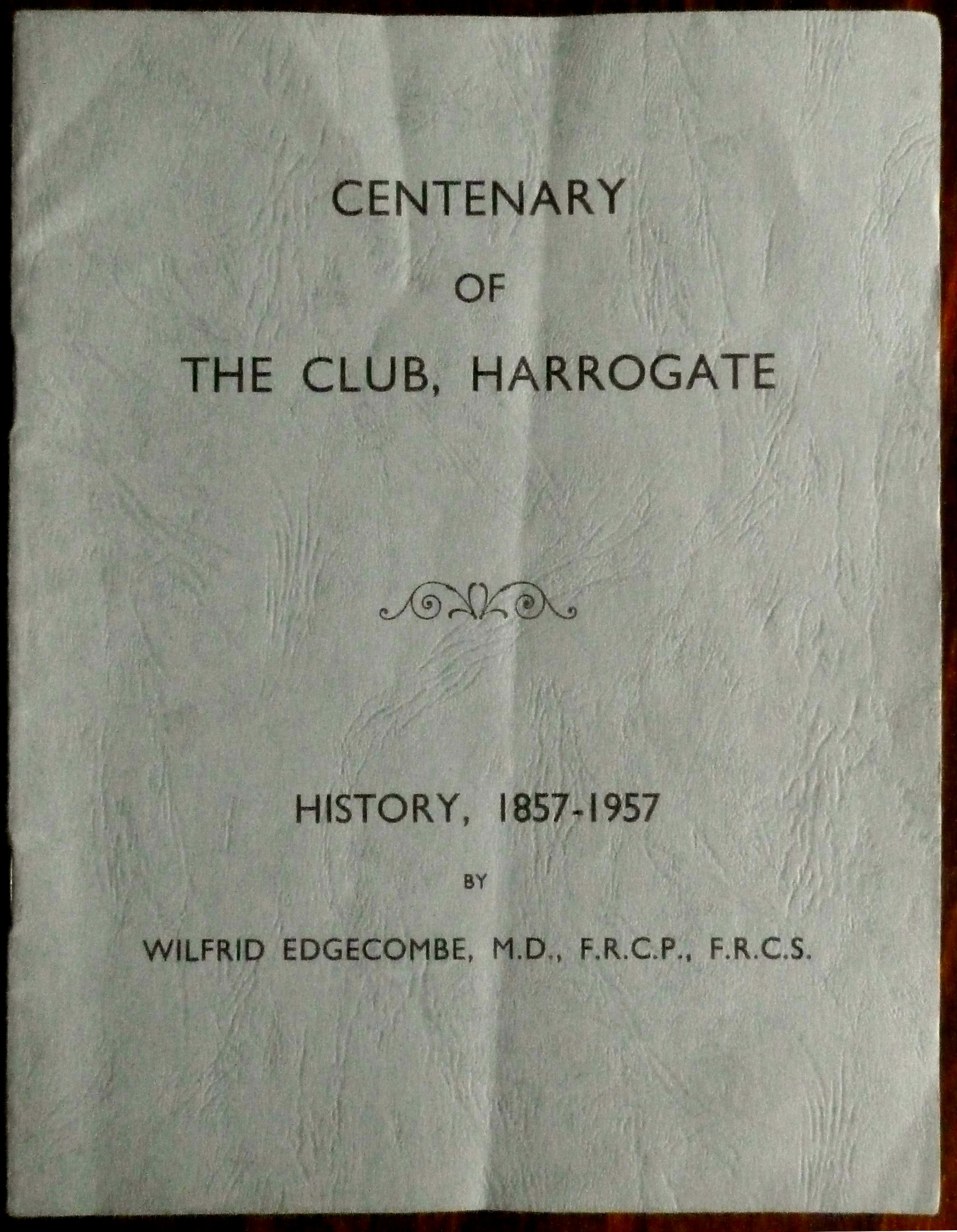
Cover of Centenary of the Club, Harrogate (1957)

- Edgecombe, Wilfrid (25 June 1898). "The effect of exercise on the haemoglobin with reference to the value of rest in the treatment of anaemia". British Medical Journal. 1 (1956): 1650–1653. doi:10.1136/bmj.1.1956.1650. PMC 2412001. PMID 20757922.
- Edgecombe, Wilfrid; Bain, William (1899). The effect of baths, massage, and exercise on the blood-pressure. London: Lancet Office.
- Edgecombe, Wilfrid; Bain, William (1899). "The physiological action of certain mineral waters on the blood and on the excretion of urea and uric acid". Journal of Physiology.
- Edgecombe, Wilfrid (31 August 1899). "Why people go to spas". Nature. 60 (1557). UK: Springer Nature: 416–420. Bibcode:1899Natur..60..416E. doi:10.1038/060416a0.
- Bain, William; Edgecombe, Wilfrid (1905). The Physiology and Therapeutics of the Harrogate Waters, Baths and Climate Applied to the Treatment of Chronic Disease. London: Longmans, Green & Co.
- Edgecombe, Wilfred (1905). "Effects of baths and certain forms of electricity on the blood, blood pressure and metabolism". Lancet.
- Edgecombe, Wilfrid (1908). "Metastatic pancreatitis in mumps". Practice.
- Edgecombe, Wilfrid (1908). "Blood pressure in spa practice". Balneol Climatol.
- Edgecombe, Wilfrid (17 April 1913). "The significance, treatment and prognosis of high blood-pressure". Journal of the Royal Society of Medicine. 6 (Balneol Climatol): 77–95. doi:10.1177/003591571300600120. PMC 2006732. PMID 19976489.
- Edgecombe, Wilfrid (1920). "Visceral Fibrositis". Journal of the Royal Society of Medicine. 13 (Balneol Climatol): 14–22. doi:10.1177/003591572001300103. PMC 2152118. PMID 19980851.
- Edgecombe, Wilfrid (May 1925). "The Principles of Spa Treatment in Great Britain". Journal of the Royal Society of Medicine. 18 (Balneol_Climatol). London: Royal Society of Medicine: 1–12. doi:10.1177/003591572501800101. PMC 2202400. PMID 19984216.
- Edgecombe, Wilfrid (June 1929). "A lecture on the principles of spa treatment". British Medical Journal. 1 (3569): 981–983. doi:10.1136/bmj.1.3569.981. PMC 2450787. PMID 20774720.
- Edgecombe, Wilfrid (August 1935). "The economic effects of spa treatment". The Journal of State Medicine. 43 (8). Oxford University Press: 449–466.
- Edgecombe, Wilfrid (1958). The Story of a Hospital. Harrogate: Harrogate People and Places/Harrogate Historical Society.

Undated

- Edgecombe, Wilfrid. "The baths of Harrogate: their nature, action and uses". Reviser of Arts.
- Edgecombe, Wilfrid. "Constipation; Diarrhoea". Quain's Dictionary of Medicine.

=== Other publications ===
- Edgecombe, Wilfrid (1914). A Mixed Grill, or varied verse on winter sports and other topics (1 ed.). Samedan, Switzerland: Engadin Press Col. A copy of this poetry collection was presented by the author to The Royal College of Physicians in 1935.
- Edgecombe, Wilfrid (1951). De Senectute: quotations from literature concerning old age. This book was quoted by Lord Cohen of Birkenhead in 1965.
- Edgecombe, Wilfrid (1957). Centenary of the Club, Harrogate. History 1857–1957.
