= Jubilee Memorial, Harrogate =

1887 memorial in North Yorkshire, England

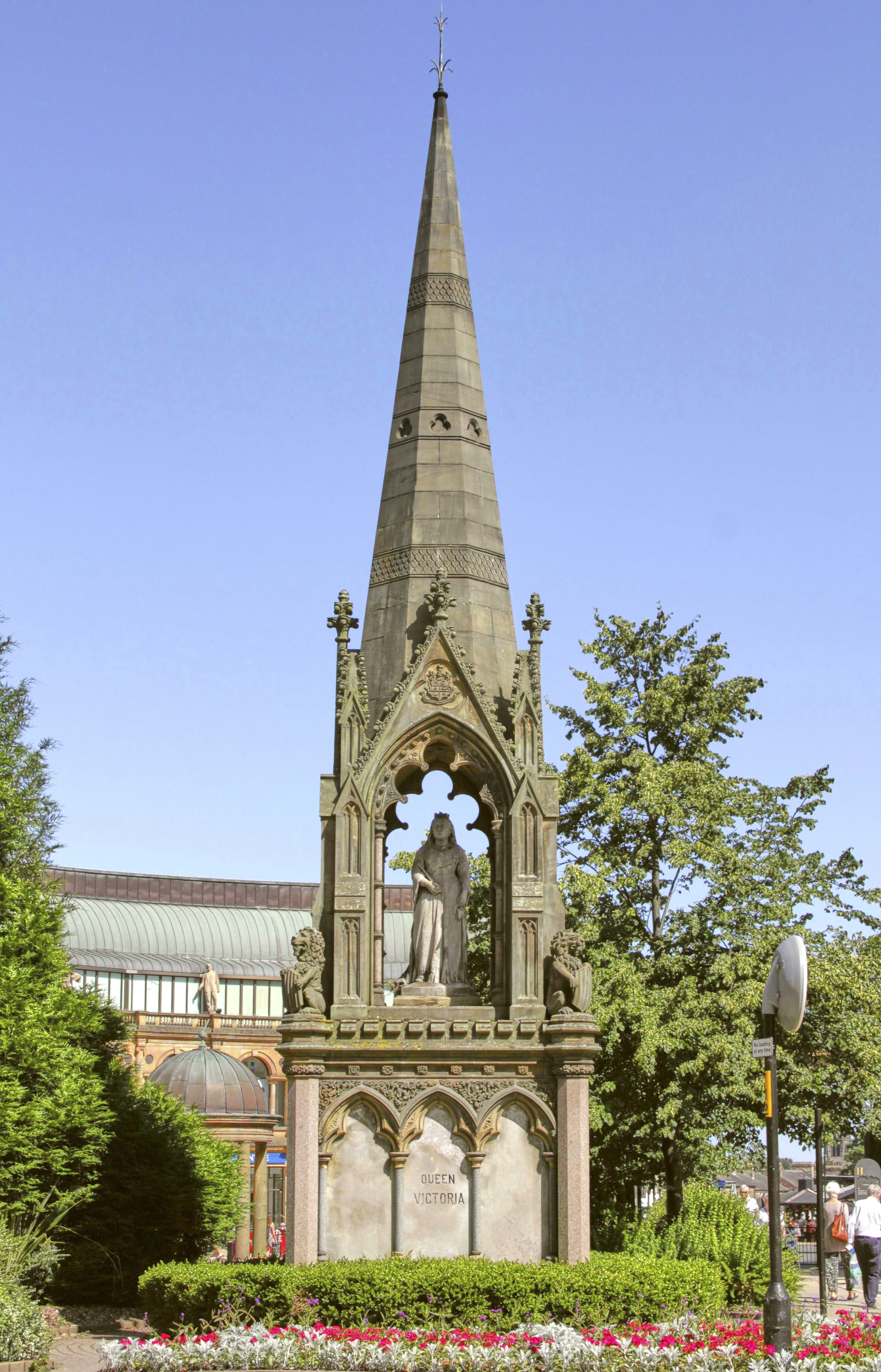
- Location: Station Square, Harrogate, North Yorkshire, England
- Coordinates: 53.9923°N 1.5381°W
- Designer: Arthur Bown
- Type: Gothic Revival shrine, reminiscent of the Albert Memorial
- Material: Sandstone; granite; Sicilian marble
- Width: 9.5 ft (2.90 m).
- Height: 45 ft (13.72 m).
- Beginning date: 14 April 1887
- Completion date: 1887
- Dedicated date: 6 October 1887

The Jubilee Memorial, Harrogate, is a Grade II listed building. It is a Gothic Revival stone memorial in Harrogate, North Yorkshire, England, commemorating the 1887 golden jubilee of Queen Victoria. It was donated to Harrogate by its mayor, Richard Ellis, designed by architect Arthur Bown, and unveiled by the Marquis of Ripon.

The monument is built of sandstone in three storeys, with granite shafts and a Sicilian marble statue of Queen Victoria by sculptor William John Seward Webber. The lowest storey is a square stone plinth, which carries the dedications. The middle storey contains the statue of Victoria. The upper storey is the carved stone canopy, in the form of a spire.

== Description ==
This is a Grade II listed building, designed by the local architect Arthur Bown of H. E. and A. Bown, Harrogate. (Note: Although Arthur Bown's brother and business partner Henry Edwin Bown died six years before the Jubilee Memorial was formally opened, the local newspapers credited him along with his brother Arthur for his share in the architectural design.) It was constructed by Richardson of Scarborough, and it contains a statue of Queen Victoria executed by William John Seward Webber. According to English Heritage, the canopy was also carved by Webber. The body of the monument is constructed of sandstone, and the statue is of Sicilian marble. The columns are of Scottish pink and grey granite. The Leeds Mercury (1887) said:

This is a statue of the Queen in white marble ... The statue finds a place in a stone structure in the Decorated Gothic style, verging upon the Perpendicular. There are, so to speak, three stories. The lower one forms the pedestal. This is square, and has at each angle a granite shaft, surmounted by a lion rampant and shield. One of the panels bears an inscription stating the object and date of the monument. The second or principal story is an arched canopy, under which the statue stands, and this is supported by piers with granite shafts. The arches are decorated, and there are crocketed gablets and pinnacles, the centre of each gablet having a trefoiled panel, with the borough coat-of-arms. The upper story takes the form of a graceful spire. The height of the monument is 45 ft (13.72 m), and the base is 9 ft 6 in (2.90 m) square, the whole being enclosed by an ornamental railing. The statue is 6 ft 6 in (1.98 m) in height, and has been carved out of a block of Sicilian marble weighing 4½ tons. Her Majesty is represented standing with the sceptre in her right hand, and the pose is calm and dignified. She wears the Imperial crown, and is attired in a reception dress trimmed with lace. Upon her breast is the Order of the Garter and that of Victoria and Albert. Her necklace contains the famous Koh-i-Noor. The train of the dress is gracefully arranged, and the design generally is admirable. The more striking feature of the statue, however, is the faithful likeness of Her Majesty which the sculptor, Mr. Webber, has presented. He has evidently done his work in a conscientious manner, and the result must tend to enhance his reputation as a sculptor.

The monument originally had "magnificent iron railings". They were lost during the First World War under Regulation 50 of the Defence (General) Regulations, 1939, when the Ministry of Works requisitioned ironwork for use in munitions manufacture. However, there is some doubt as to what really happened to the railings, following requisition.

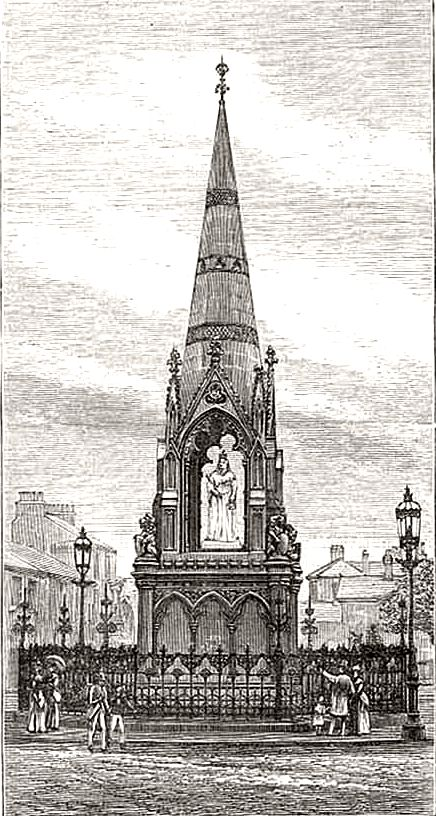
The Jubilee Memorial, 1887

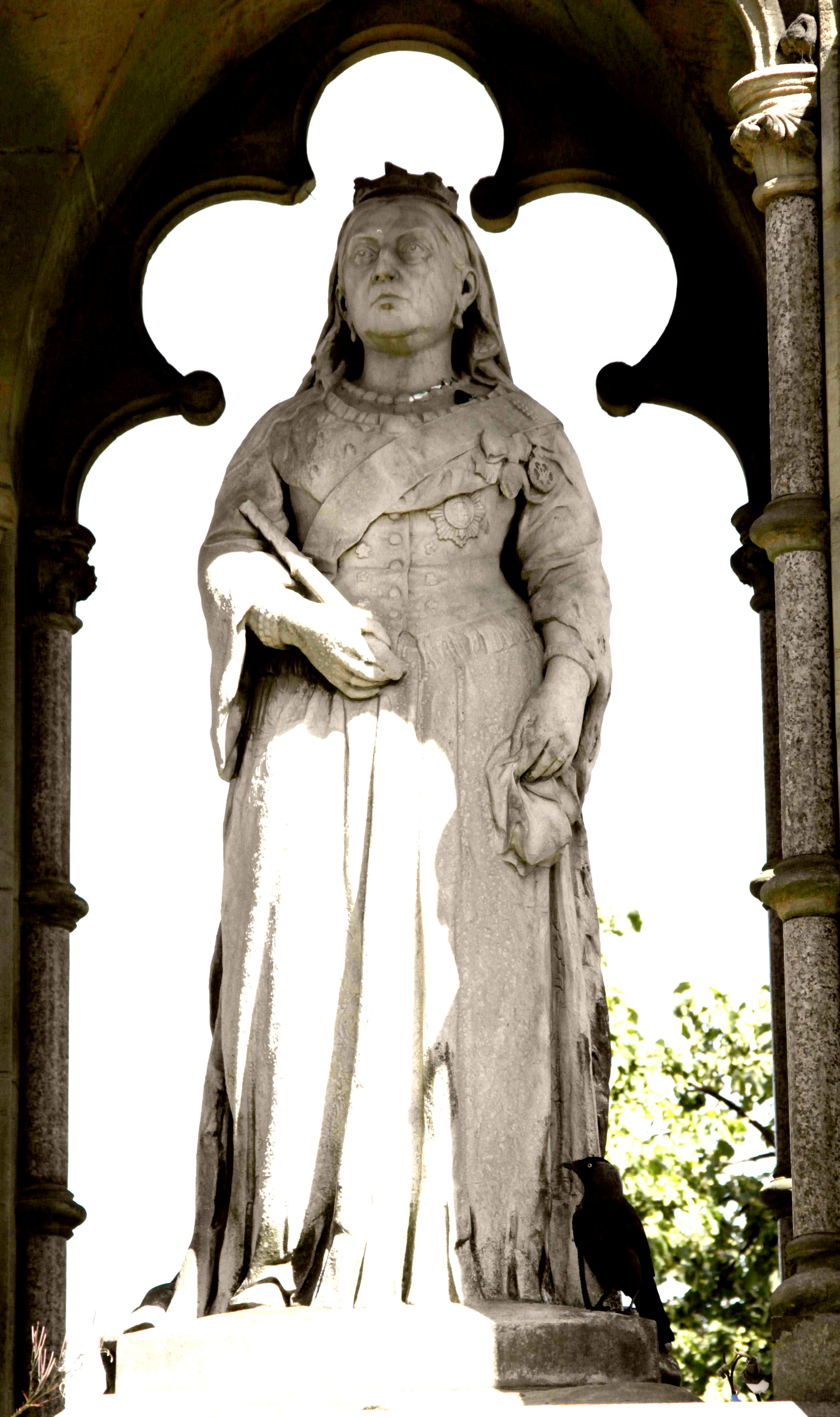
Queen Victoria by Webber, 1887

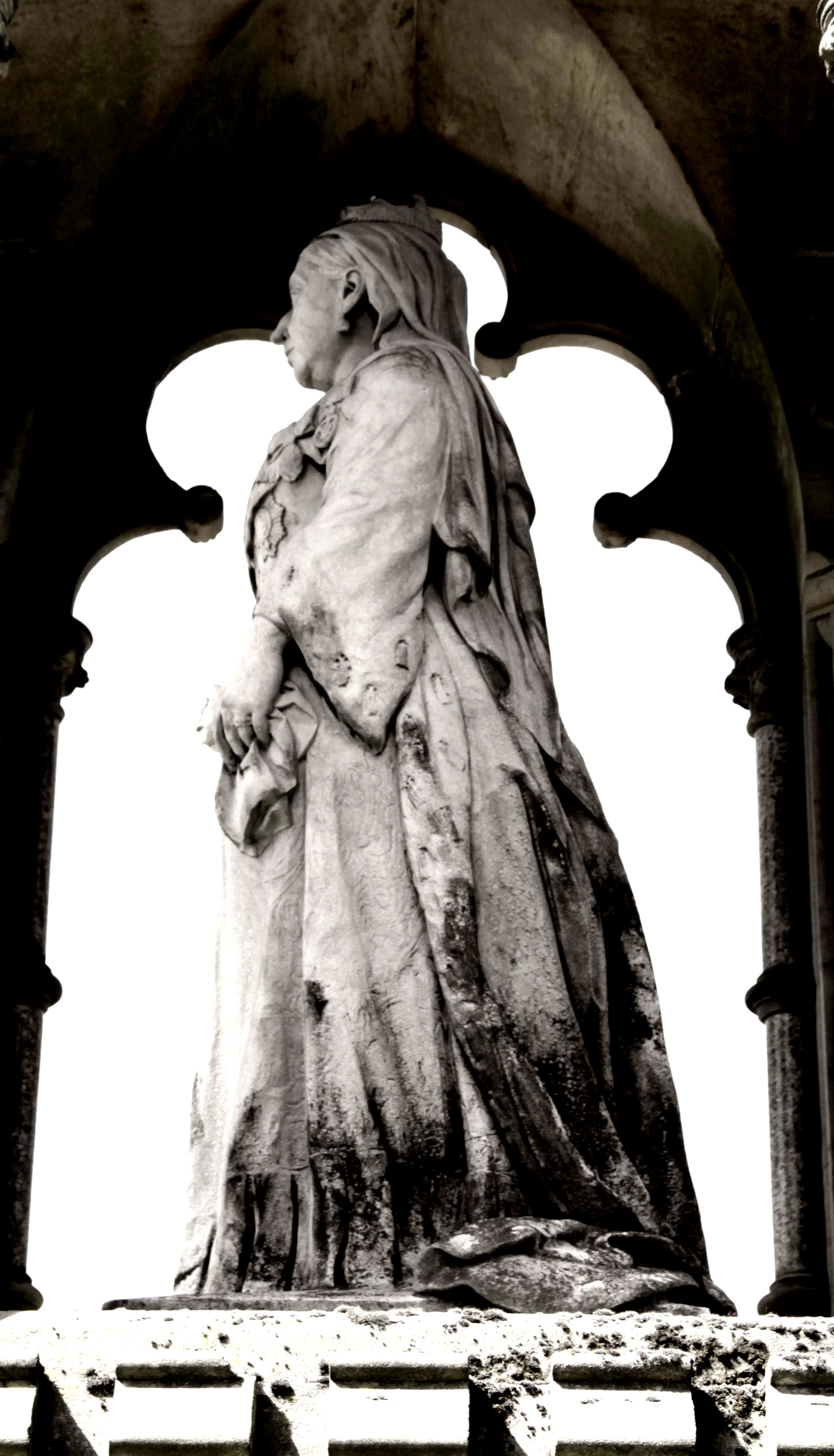
Queen Victoria by Webber, 1887

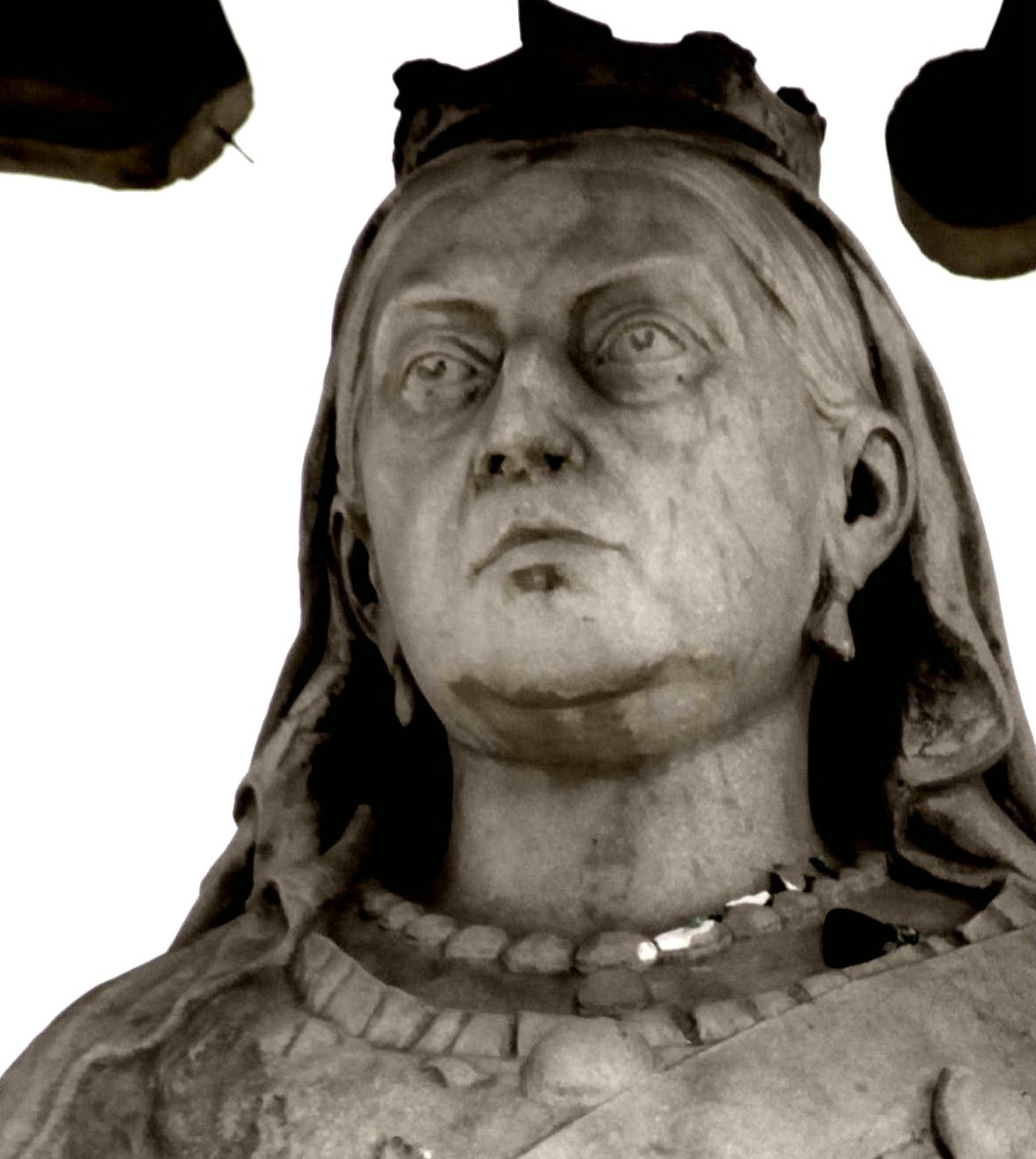
Queen Victoria by Webber, 1887. Showing the Koh-i-Noor cabochon diamond on her necklace.

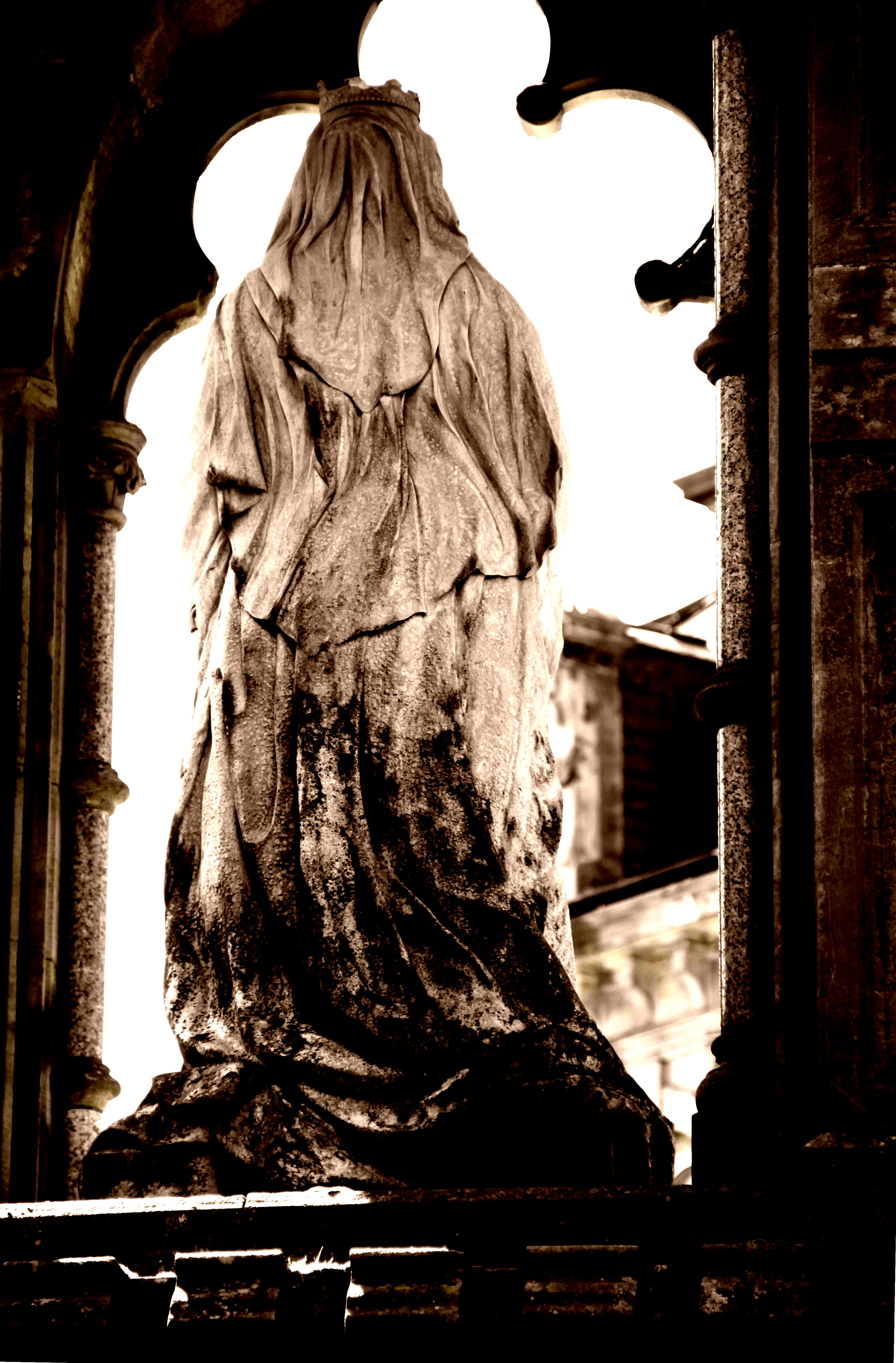
Queen Victoria by Webber, 1887

== History ==
=== Planning and funding ===
The memorial was planned as a commemoration of the 1887 golden jubilee of Queen Victoria. The original design for this memorial was a drinking fountain "with a pedestal and canopy for a statue". However the design was changed – on the grounds that it "might have been a source of annoyance" – for a memorial and statue only. The site used was originally triangular, but "to give more space for carriage traffic", the site was made circular. The memorial was given to Harrogate by Mayor Richard Ellis, aided by public subscription of £103 10s. 10d. (equivalent to £14,537.58 in 2023) raised by The Ladies' Jubilee Committee. 1,604 citizens subscribed, no-one giving more than £1; some giving as little as a penny.

=== Laying the foundation stone, 1887 ===
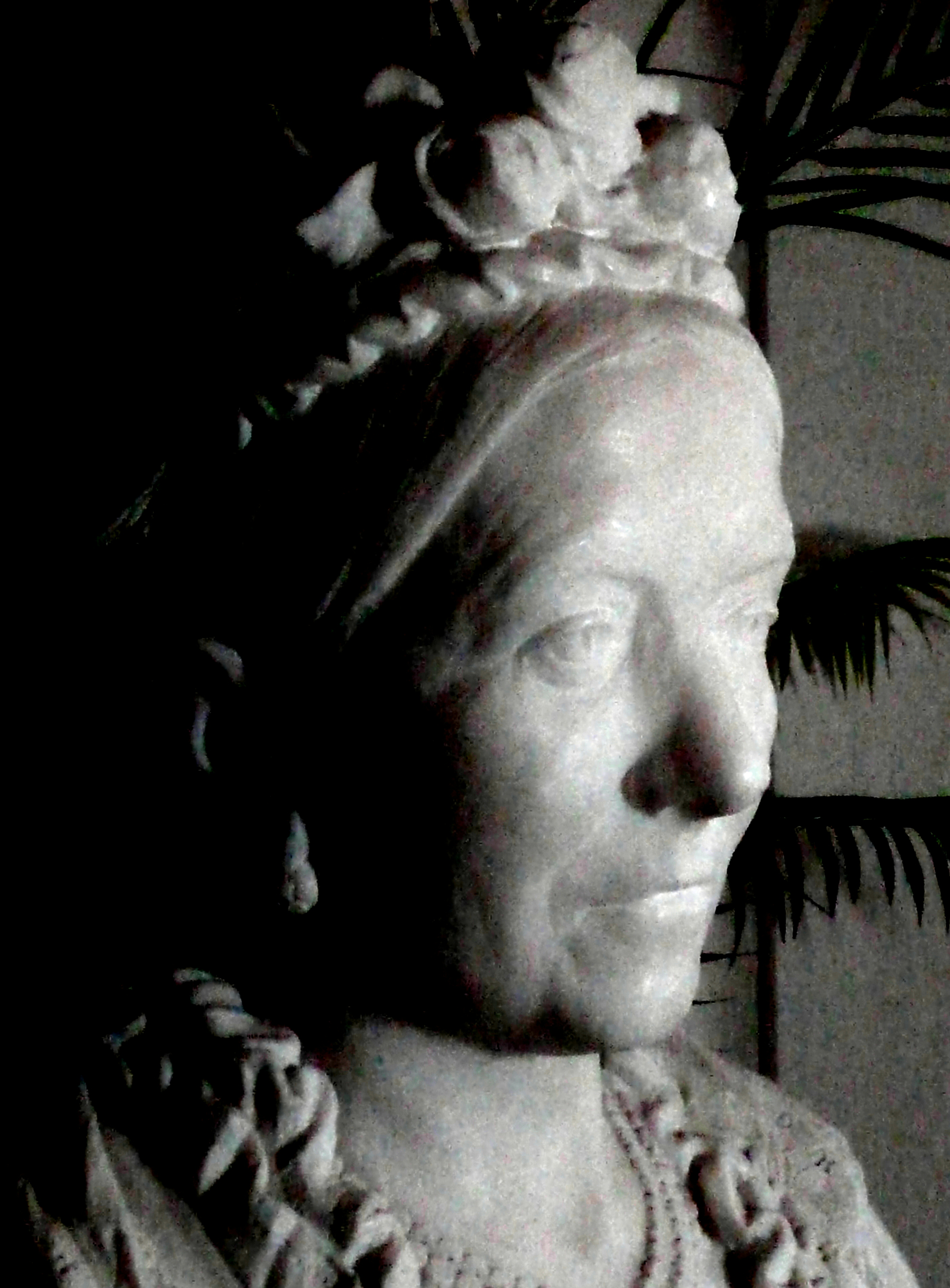
Mary Jane Ellis, by Webber, 1888

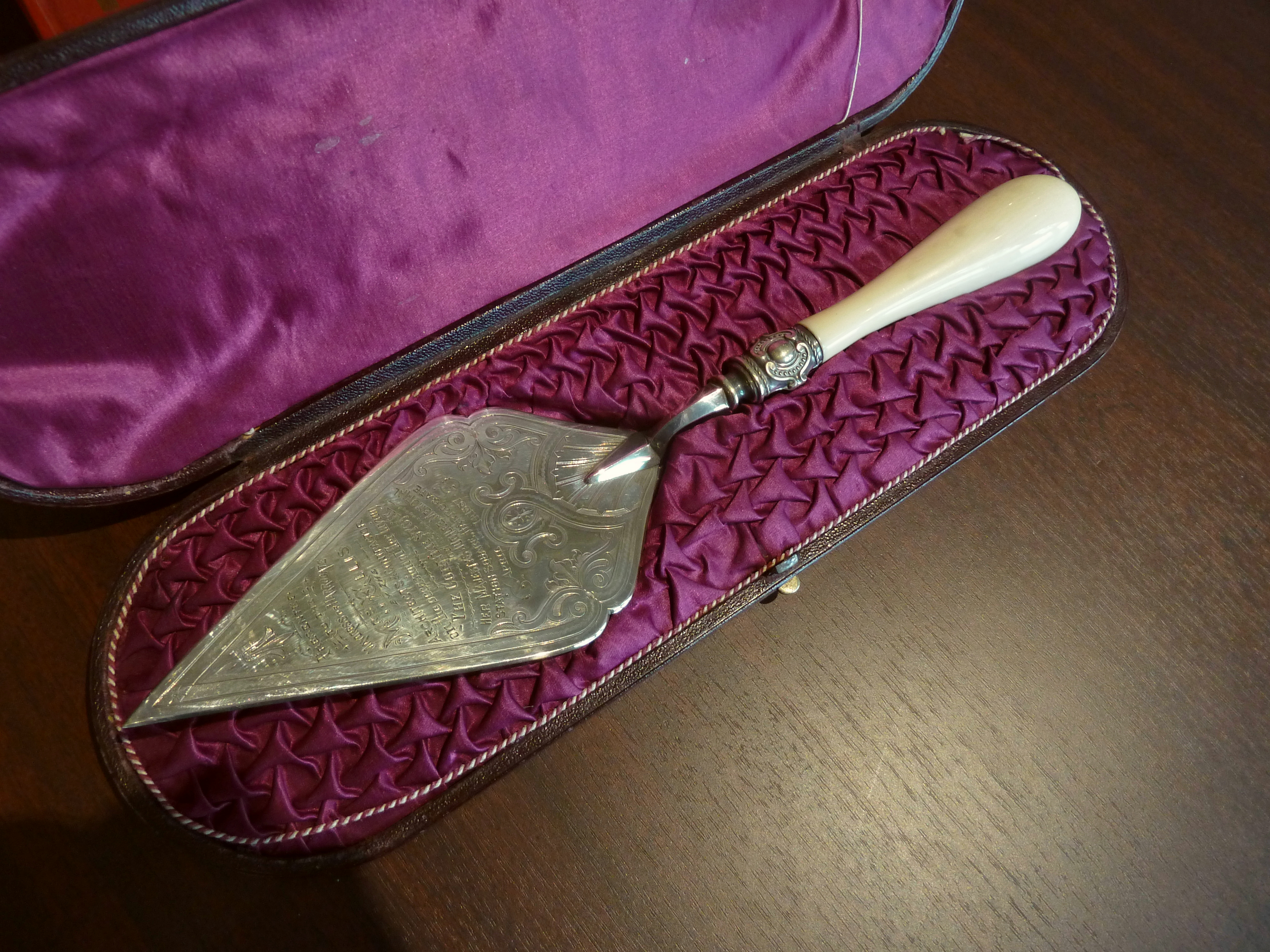
Commemorative trowel presented to Mary Jane Ellis, 1887

The foundation stone for the Jubilee Memorial was laid by Mayor Richard Ellis's wife Mary Jane Ellis (c.1823–c.1897) on the morning of 14 April 1887, in "unusually severe" and snowy weather, but nevertheless "in the presence of a large concourse of spectators". The crowd included the Mayor and Corporation, and a "large number" of women representing part of the Ladies' Jubilee Committee.

Arthur Bown presented the Mayoress with a silver trowel and mallet. The inscription on the trowel was:

Presented to the Mayoress of Harrogate (Mrs Ellis) by the architects and contractor, on the occasion of her laying the corner stone of Her Majesty's Jubilee Memorial, Station Square, Harrogate, April 14th, 1887.

A number of speeches were made, all received with applause and cheers from the crowd. The careful formality of the occasion may be seen in the following exchange, which included wry jokes about the potentially fatal effect of standing for an hour or two in the snow. Bown said:

I have great pleasure in presenting you with the trowel and mallet wherewith to lay the stone. I hope you will be living and in good health when the work is completed; so that you may look upon it with pride and pleasure.

The Mayoress (who was not at death's door) replied:

I am greatly obliged to you for the kind expressions, and trust that I shall have the pleasure of seeing the work brought to a satisfactory completion.

Mayoress Ellis spoke to the crowd about the way in which the Jubilee Memorial represented their loyalty to the Queen, ending (to loud cheers) with:

I think this monument will answer [its] purpose. I therefore hope it will be completed in due course, and without any accident to the workmen, and that it will long be to the residents of Harrogate, and the visitors resorting hither, a source of pleasure.

=== Unveiling ceremony, 1887 ===
The monument was unveiled by the Marquis of Ripon on 6 October 1887. He was met at Harrogate railway station by the mayor and corporation, and was escorted across the road to the ceremony in a grand procession of police, a brass band, the fire brigade, local societies, associations and committees, the magistrates, architect Arthur Bown, sculptor (Webber) and contractor, the enrobed mayor and corporation, and officials. The station was adorned with flags, and the monument site encircled by a "dense concourse of spectators", who "loudly cheered" the marquis before being treated to a long speech, which was regularly interrupted with cheers and applause. About a hundred worthies (including Webber) were invited to a dinner at the Crown Hotel, Harrogate. Speeches were made, and healths (including that of Webber and the architect Arthur Bown) were drunk.

=== Visit of Prince Albert Victor, 1889 ===
Prince Albert Victor, grandson of Queen Victoria, visited Harrogate in 1889 to open an extension to the Royal Bath Hospital, Harrogate. For that occasion the Jubilee Memorial was garlanded. It still had its "magnificent iron railings". (Note: The 1887 iron railings which originally surrounded the monument were likely supplied by architect Arthur Bown's father in law, Batley iron founder John Bagshaw. Bown used Bagshaw's iron work frequently in his designs.)

=== Queen Victoria's diamond jubilee, 1897 ===
The monument was garlanded again on 22 June 1897, in celebration of Queen Victoria's diamond jubilee. In the morning, when the photograph (below) was taken, the temperature was 76 °F (24 °C) in the shade. There was a procession through the town, while all the church bells rang.

=== Queen Victoria's funeral, 1901 ===
On the day of Queen Victoria's funeral, 2 February 1901, the licensed victuallers of Harrogate closed their premises until 6 pm and placed a wreath on the Jubilee Memorial, which was "draped in black and purple". Some societies, and people from the town, added more wreaths there.

=== State visit of the Lord Mayor of London, 1913 ===
On 7 June 1913, the Jubilee Memorial was garlanded in celebration of the state visit to Harrogate of the Lord Mayor of London, David Burnett. He was to open extensions to the Victoria Baths, and the Old Sulphur Well (now called the Royal Pump Room). On that day, Burnett brought the state landau with him on the train, and processed in it around the town with the Mayor of Harrogate Joseph Rowntree, (Note: This was the Quaker and Liberal politician Joseph Stephenson Rowntree (1875–1951), who was Mayor of Harrogate 1911–1913. He was the son of Joseph Rowntree (philanthropist).) twenty visiting mayors, the Yorkshire Hussars band, and mounted police.

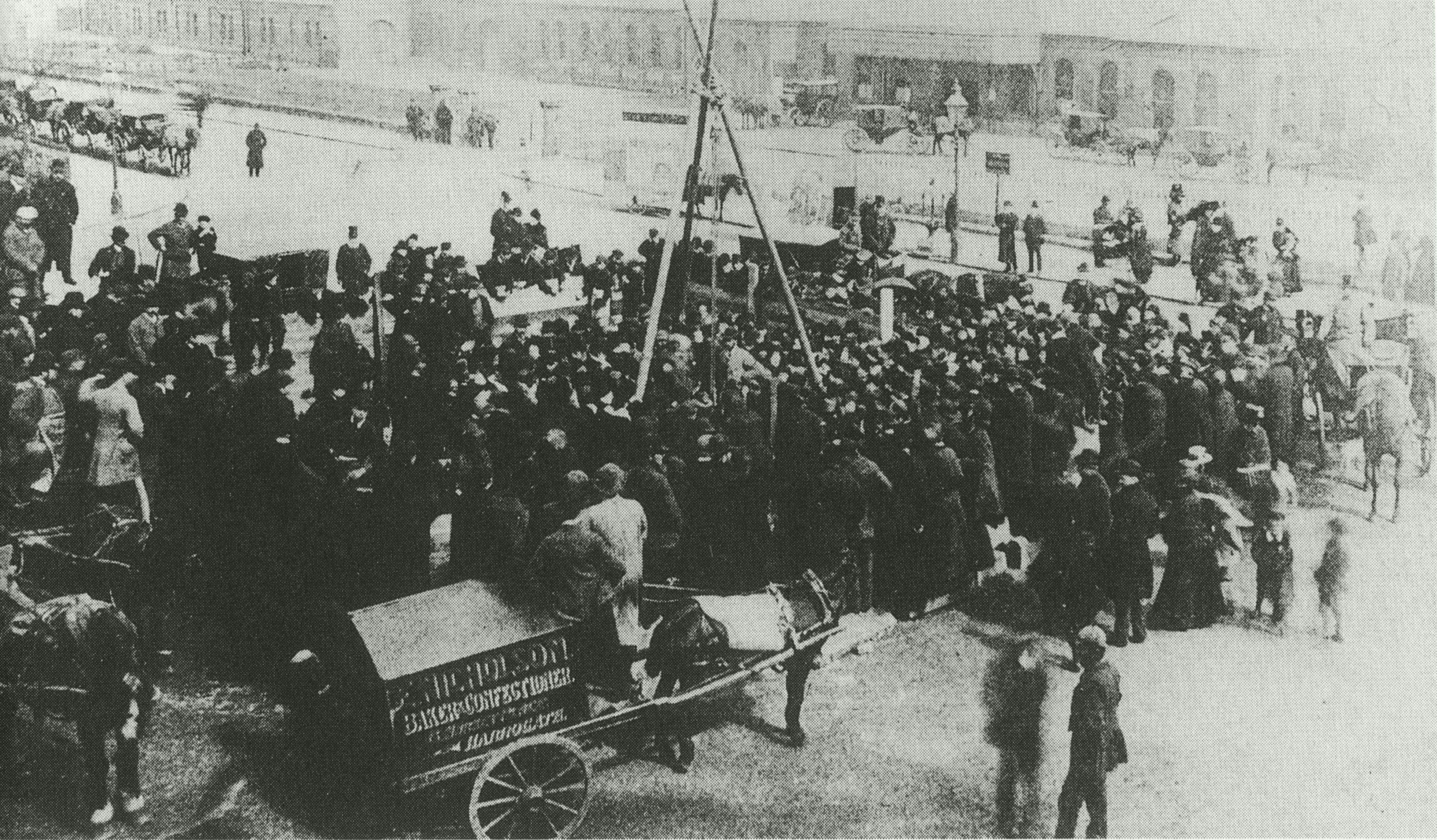
The crowd at the laying of the foundation stone, 1887. The A-frame supported the pulley which lowered the stone.

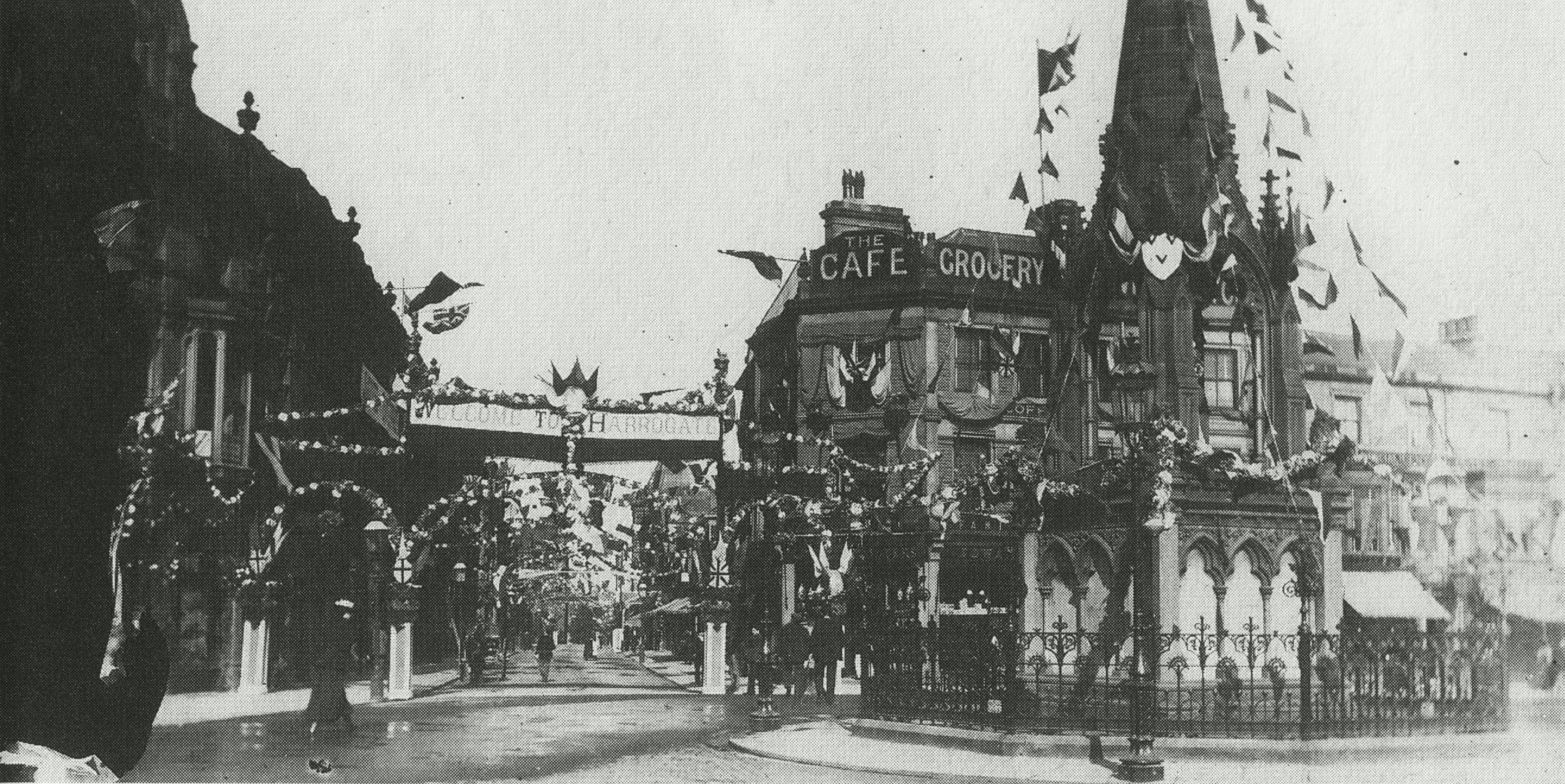
The monument garlanded for Prince Albert Victor's visit, 1889

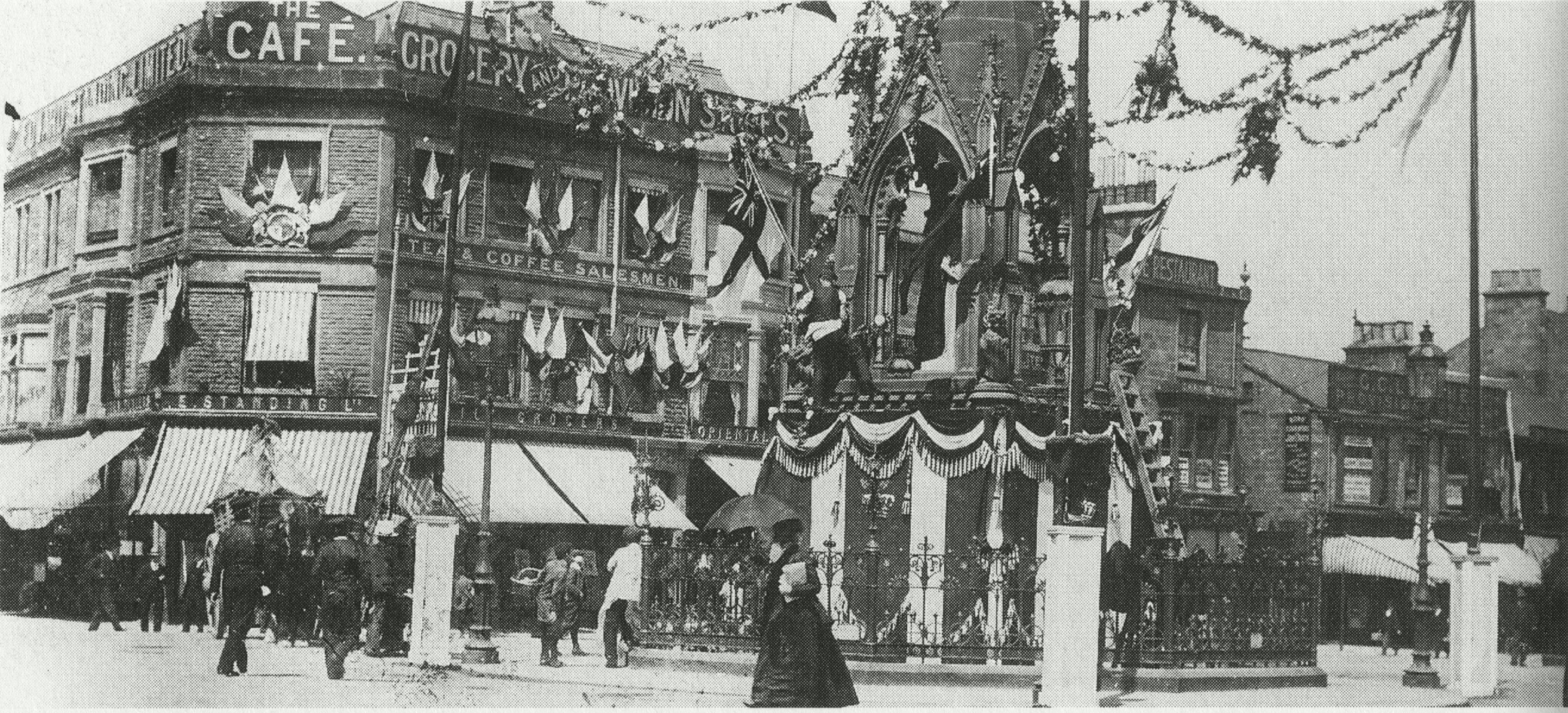
The monument garlanded for Victoria's diamond jubilee, 1897

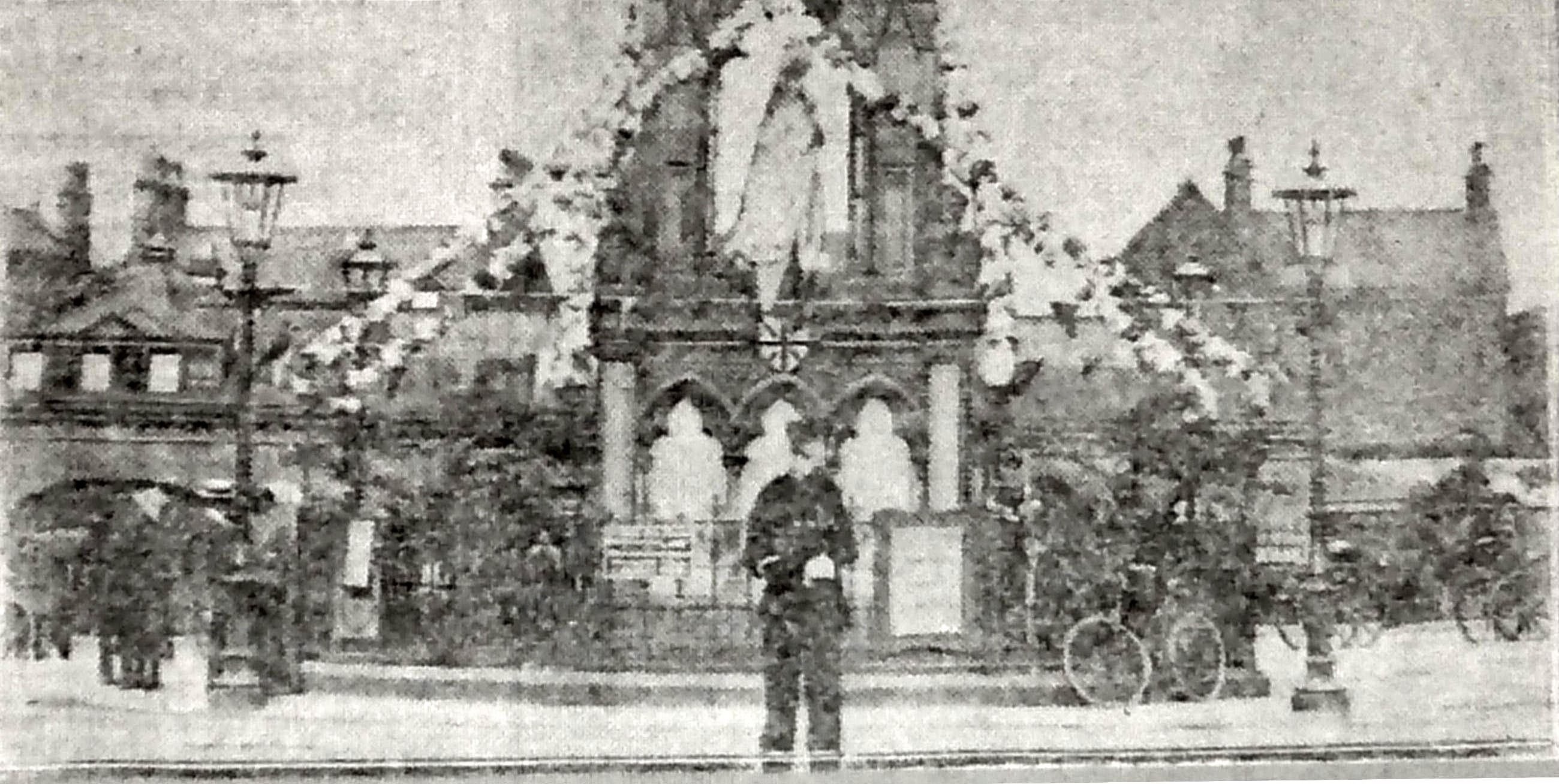
The monument garlanded for the Lord Mayor of London's visit, 1913

== Reviews ==
On 22 March 1888, Prince Albert Victor, grandson of Queen Victoria, visited the monument and "expressed his warm admiration of the likeness" of the statue to his grandmother.

In 2012 a visitor to Harrogate found the gardens around the monument uncared-for.
