= Queen's Park, Heywood =

Public park in Greater Manchester, England

Queen's Park
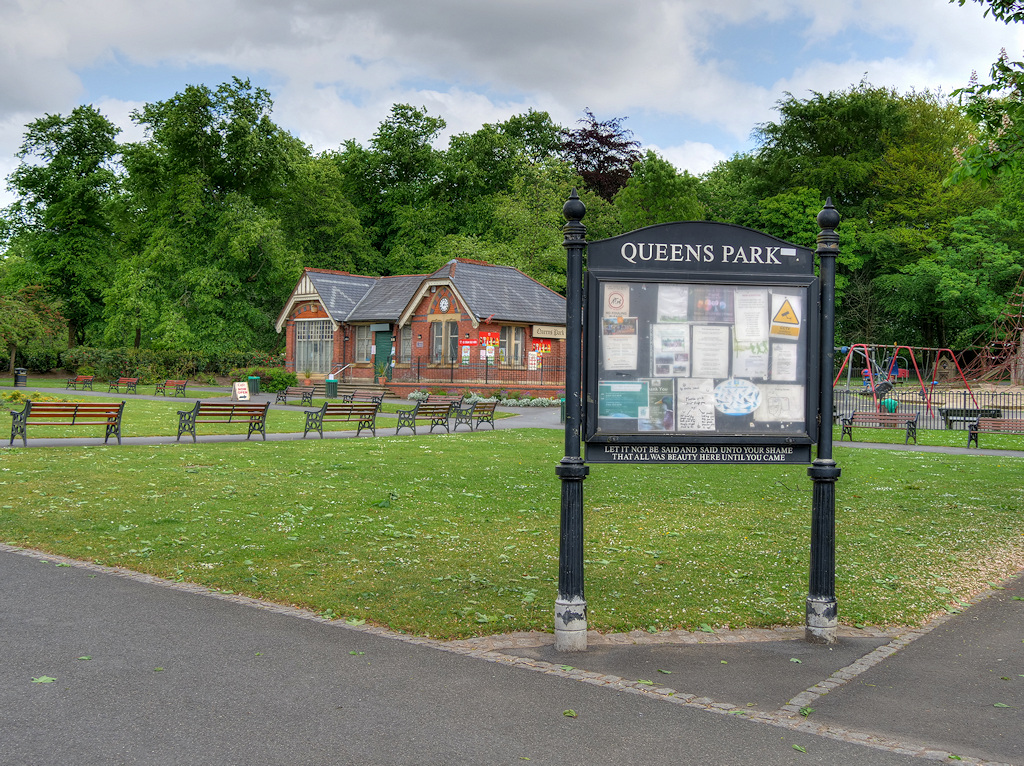
- The park in 2020
- Interactive map of Queen's Park
- Type: Municipal park
- Location: Queen's Park Road, Heywood, Greater Manchester, England
- Coordinates: 53.6013°N 2.2188°W
- Area: c. 13 hectares (32 acres)
- Opened: 2 August 1879; 147 years ago
- Operator: Rochdale Borough Council
- Designation

National Register of Historic Parks and Gardens
- Official name: Queen's Park, Rochdale
- Type: Grade II
- Designated: 9 August 2001
- Reference no.: 1001541
- Website: Official website

Queen's Park is a public park on Queen's Park Road in Heywood, a town within the Metropolitan Borough of Rochdale, Greater Manchester, England. Created on land gifted to the Heywood Local Board in the 1870s, it was laid out on the former grounds of Heywood House and opened in 1879. The park was later extended eastwards in 1923 with the addition of a boating lake, and it was designated Grade II on the Register of Historic Parks and Gardens in 2001.

== History ==
The park is situated on land formerly owned by a local cotton manufacturer Charles Martin Newhouse. He died in 1873 without a will, so his estate reverted to Queen Victoria through the Duchy of Lancaster, who subsequently gifted the land to the Heywood Local Board. The park was laid out on the former grounds of Heywood House and opened on 2 August 1879.

In 1923 additional land was donated by alderman David Healey, which extended the park eastwards to include a boating lake.

On 9 August 2001, the park was designated Grade II on the Register of Historic Parks and Gardens.

== Features ==
Queen's Park Lodge and three-basin ornamental fountain were both designed by the Harrogate architectural practice H. E. and A. Bown in 1878.

The park contains a number of facilities, including a café, open-air theatre, children's play area, bowling greens and a tennis court.

== Gallery ==
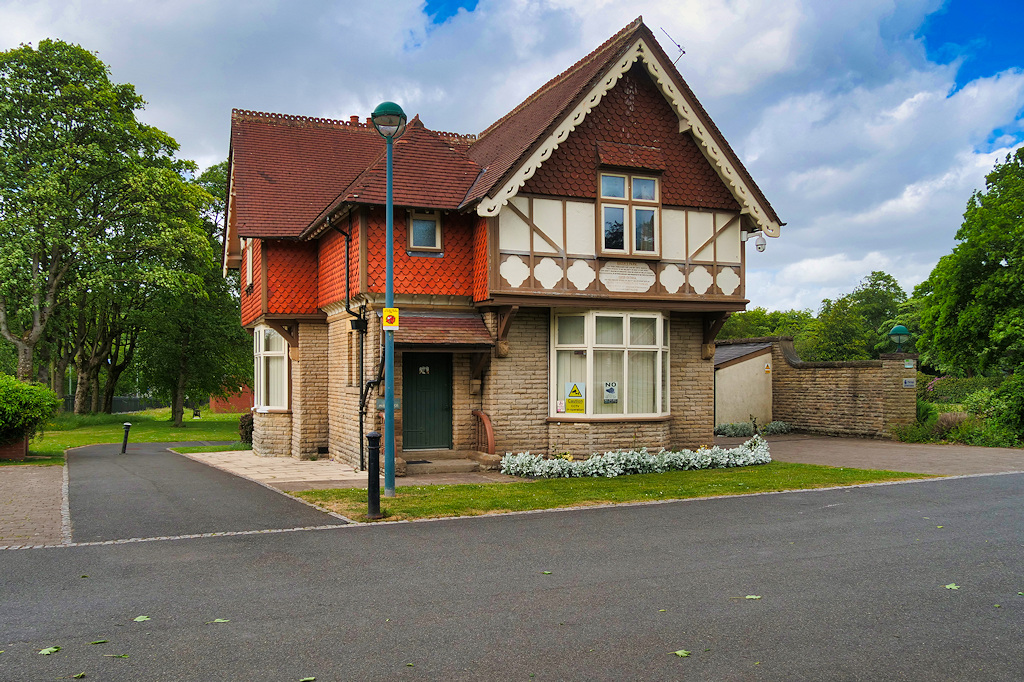
Queen's Park Lodge in 2020

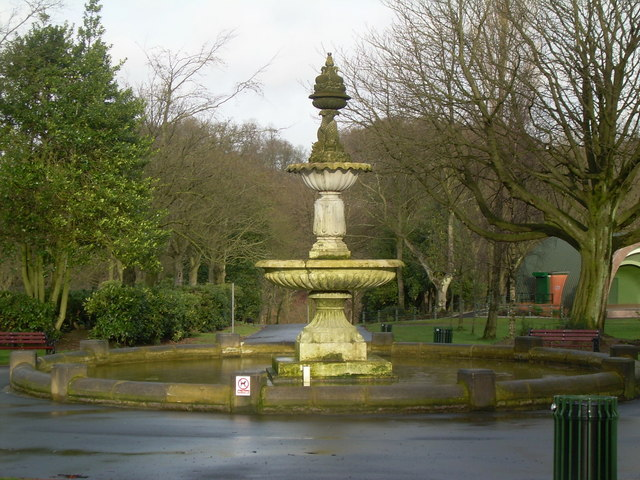
Fountain at Queen's Park in 2007

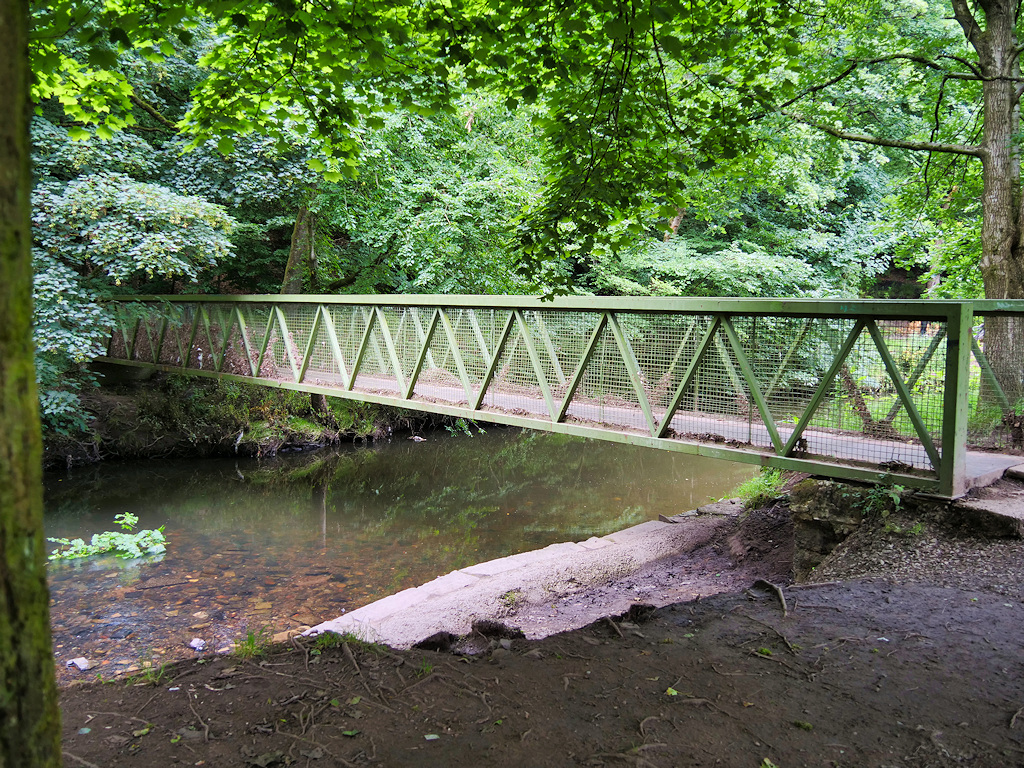
Footbridge across the River Roch in 2020

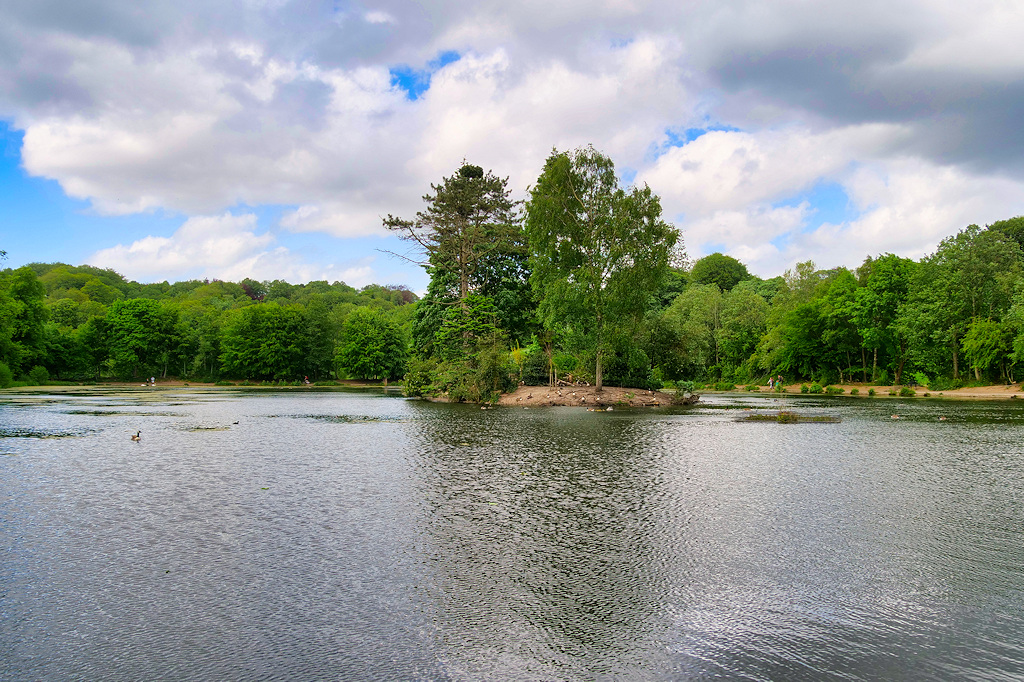
Island and boating lake in 2020

== See also ==
- Listed buildings in Heywood, Greater Manchester
