= St George's Hall, Liverpool =

Historic building in Liverpool, England

St George's Hall
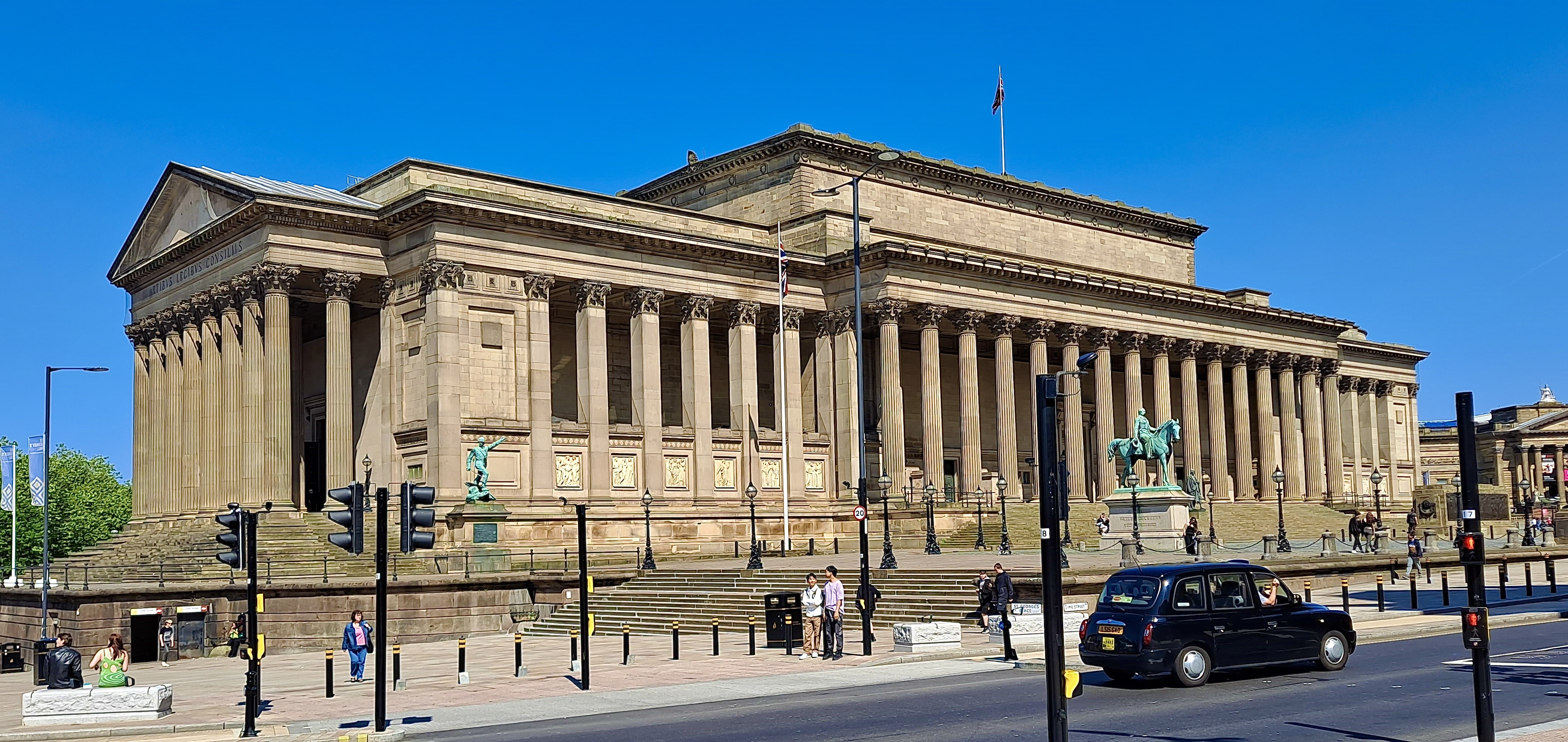
- St George's Hall

- Location in Liverpool
- 53.4086°N 2.9801°W
- Location: St George's Place, Liverpool, England
- OS grid reference: SJ 349 907

History
- Built: 1841–1854

Site notes
- Architect(s): Harvey Lonsdale Elmes; Charles Cockerell
- Architectural style: Neoclassical

Listed Building – Grade I

St George's Hall is a building on St George's Place, opposite Lime Street railway station in central Liverpool, England. Opened in 1854, it is a Neoclassical building that contains concert halls and law courts, and is listed on the National Heritage List for England as a Grade I listed building. On the east side of the hall, between it and the railway station, is St George's Plateau and on the west side are St John's Gardens. The hall is included in the William Brown Street conservation area.

In 1969, the architectural historian Nikolaus Pevsner said it is one of the finest neo-Grecian buildings in the world, although the building is known for its use of Roman as well as Greek sources. In 2004, the hall and its surrounding area were recognised as part of Liverpool's World Heritage Site until its World Heritage status was revoked in 2021. The Liverpool Register Office and Coroner's Court have been based in the hall since 2012.

== History ==
The site of the hall was formerly occupied by the first Liverpool Infirmary from 1749 to 1824. Triennial music festivals were held in the city, but there was no suitable hall to accommodate them. Following a public meeting in 1836, a company was formed to raise subscriptions for a hall in Liverpool to be used for the festivals, and for meetings, dinners and concerts. Shares were made available at £25 each and by January 1837 £23,350 (equivalent to £2,260,290 in 2025) had been raised. In 1838, the foundation stone was laid to commemorate the coronation of Queen Victoria.

A competition was announced on 5 March 1839 via an advertisement in The Times to design the hall, first prize was 250 guineas, second prize 150 guineas. By July more than eighty entries had been received, and the competition was won by Harvey Lonsdale Elmes, a London architect aged 25 years, the second prize went to George Alexander of London. The requirement was:

"There is to be accommodation in the main hall for 3000 persons; and there is also to be a concert room, capable of accommodating 1000 persons, applicable to other purposes such as lectures and smaller meetings....the cost of the building will be £35,000"

There was a need for assize courts in the city, and a competition to design them was announced, with first prize £300 and second prize £200. There were eighty-six entries, and Elmes also won it. The original plan was to have separate buildings, but in 1840 Elmes suggested combining both functions in one building on a scale that would surpass most public buildings in the country at the time. Construction started in 1841, and the building opened in 1854 (with the small concert room opening two years later).

"How frequently I observe the great & true end & aim of Art entirely lost sight of in the discussion of some insignificant detail or quaint Antiquarianism. Bold and original conceptions never can find favour while so much stress is laid upon precedent," Harvey Lonsdale Elmes in a letter to Robert Rawlinson.

Elmes died in 1847, and the work was continued by John Weightman, Corporation Surveyor, and Robert Rawlinson, structural engineer, until, in 1851, Charles Cockerell was appointed architect. Cockerell was largely responsible for the interior decoration. The eventual cost of the building exceeded £300,000 (roughly equivalent to £33,000,000 in 2019). Following the implementation of the Courts Act 1971, the former assizes court was re-designated Liverpool Crown Court. The Crown Court moved to the new Law Courts in Derby Square in 1984.

During the 2000s, a major restoration of the hall took place costing £23m, and it was officially reopened on 23 April 2007 by Prince Charles. The magnificent exterior sculpture was by William Grinsell Nicholl.

== Structure ==
=== Plan ===
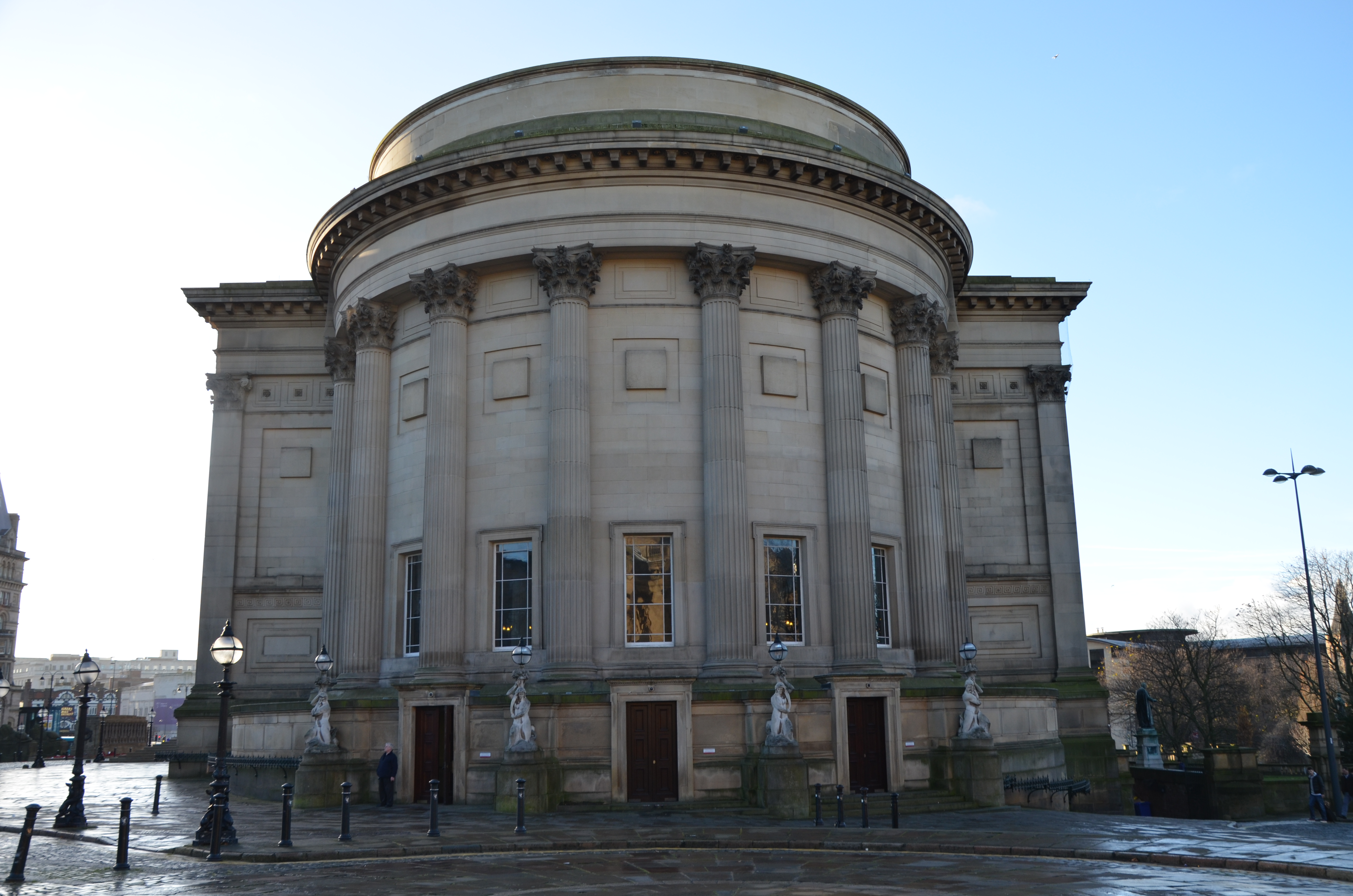
The northern end of St George's Hall

The Great Hall (also known as the Concert Hall) is the largest room, rectangular in shape, and occupies the centre of the building with an organ on its north wall. Two long corridors flank the east and west walls of the Great Hall. To the north of the Concert Hall is the Civil Court and beyond this is the North Entrance Hall; above this, reached by two staircases, is the elliptical Small Concert Room. To the south of the Great Hall is the Crown Court; beyond this is the South Entrance Hall, above which, reached by two staircases, is the Grand Jury Room. In the middle of the west front is the Law Library; to the north of this is the Vice-Chancellor's Court, to the south of the Law Library is the Sheriff's Court. The floor below consists of a cavernous basement with cells for prisoners along the west wall.

=== Exterior ===
The main entrance is in the centre of the east façade and is approached by a wide flight of steps. On the steps is a statue of Benjamin Disraeli by Charles Bell Birch, moved here to make way for Liverpool's cenotaph. At the south-east corner is a bronze statue of Major-General William Earle by the same sculptor. This front has a central portico of 16 Corinthian columns, flanked on each side by a series of square, unfluted columns, between which are reliefs added between 1882 and 1901 by Thomas Stirling Lee, C. J. Allen, and Conrad Dressler. The west front has a projecting central part with square columns supporting a large entablature. The north front has a semicircular apse with columns and three doorways flanked by statues of nereids or tritons bearing a cornucopia with lamps attached; the central doors on the south and east fronts have similar statues, sculpted by William Nicholl.

The south front has an octastyle portico (eight columns wide), two columns deep, on steps above a rusticated podium. On the south portico entablature is a classical Latin inscription using V where U would now be used, that reads ‘ARTIBVS LEGIBVS CONSILIIS LOCVM MVNICIPES CONSTITVERVNT ANNO DOMINI MDCCCXLI’ (For Arts, Law and Counsel the townspeople built this place in 1841).

The tympanum in the pediment above the south portico once contained sculptures of Britannia enthroned at the centre protecting agriculture and the arts and offering an olive branch to the four quarters of the globe, carved by William Nicholl;

Cockerell's design of the southern sculptured pediment of St George's Hall

The completed sculpture has the following written description:

“Britannia armed, her lion by her side, and seated on a rock, forms the centre: she holds in her left hand the olive-branch, and in her right the spear. She hails the four quarters of the globe, presented to her by Mercury; the last of whom, Africa, inclines with the form of the pediment and, with her negro children, acknowledges her obligations to the queen of freedom, who laboured so long and successfully for their emancipation: beyond are the vine and foreign productions; the husbandman and his plough, his wife with the distaff, and her child, express industry, manufacture, and domesticity: at the end are labourers at the anvil, the anchor, and the arms of mail, which she has not forgotten how to use”

These sculptures were removed for safety's sake in 1950 (having become unsafe due to erosion from atmospheric pollution) and were subsequently lost, reputedly turned into hardcore.

Sculpted friezes on eastern facade
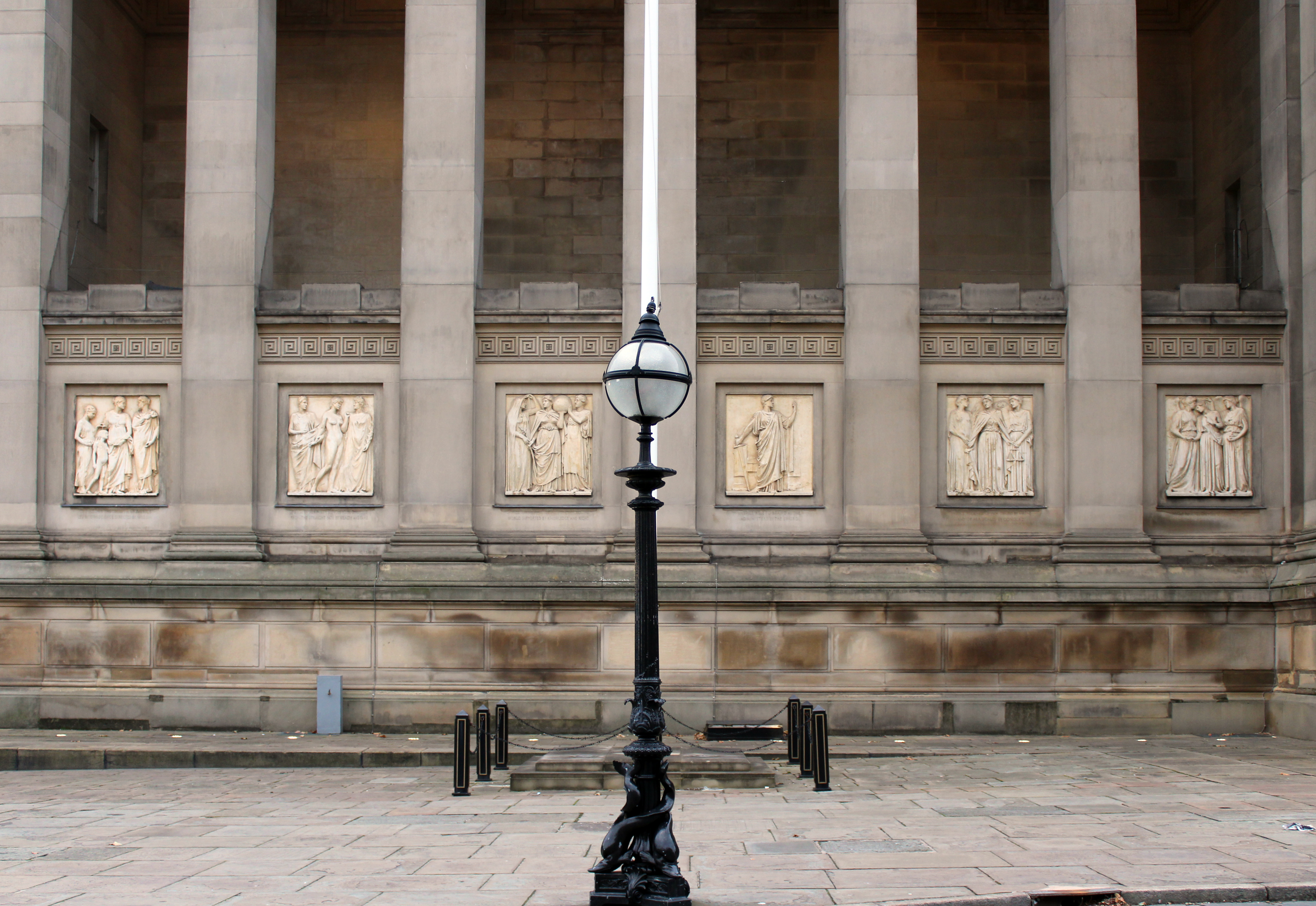
Sculptures at southern end of the east front 1882-1894 (The Growth of Justice) by Thomas Stirling Lee

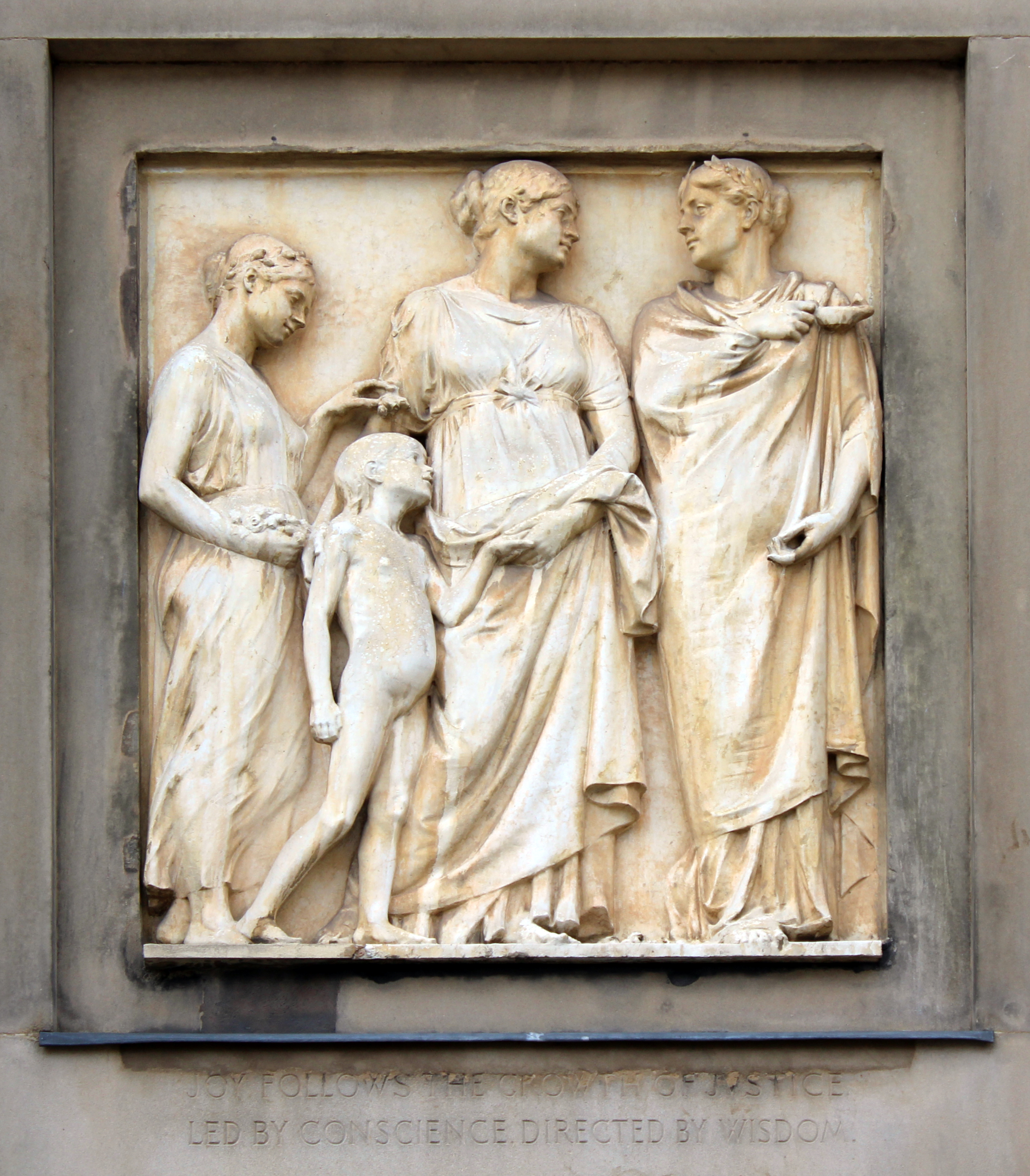
Justice, portrayed as a naked child guided by the hand of Conscience, is followed by Joy. The right-hand figure represents Wisdom holding a lamp, in a position to depict that justice comes from the heart.

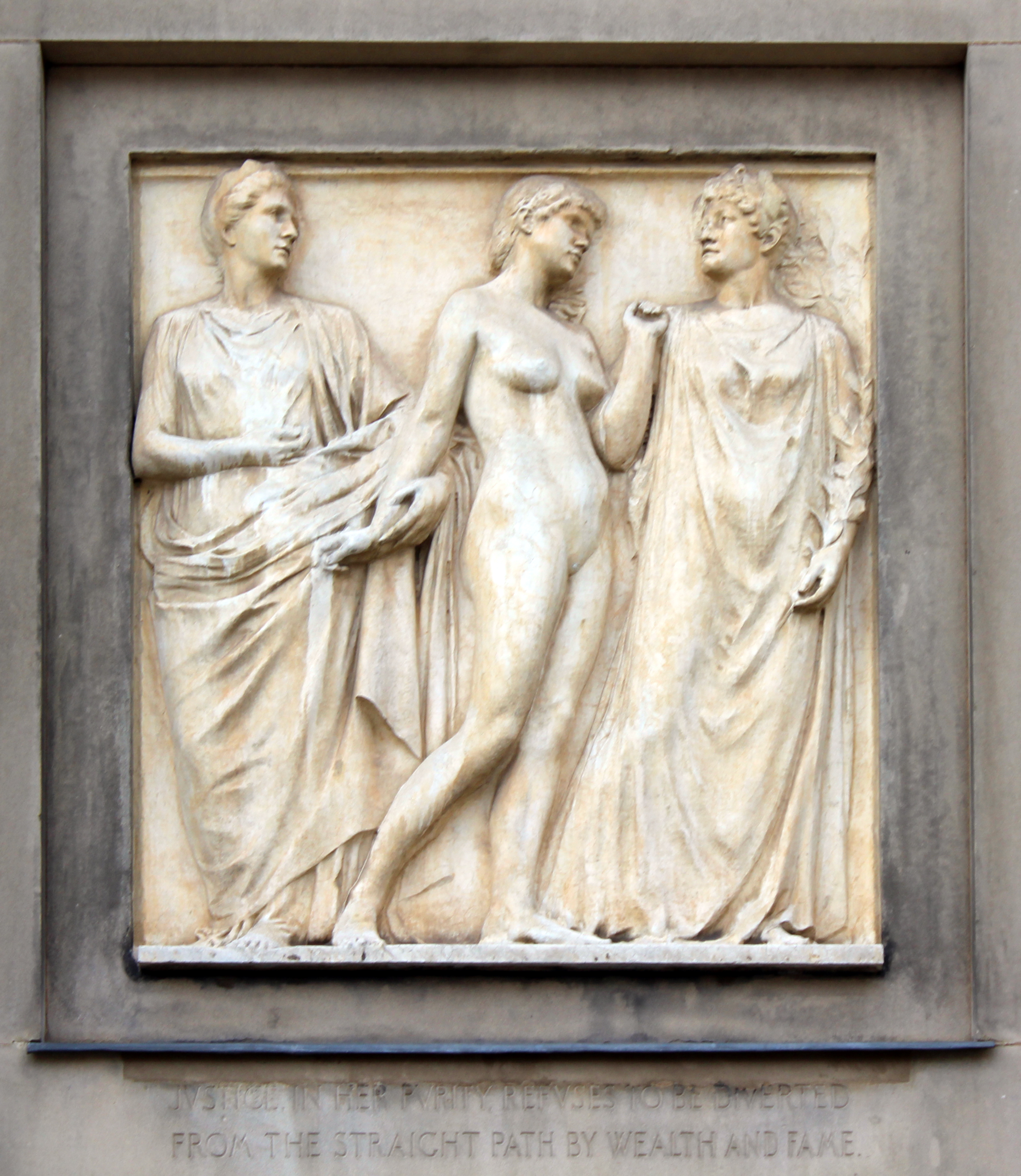
Justice, now an adult, is tempted, resists the pull of Wealth, and raises her left arm defensively toward Fame.

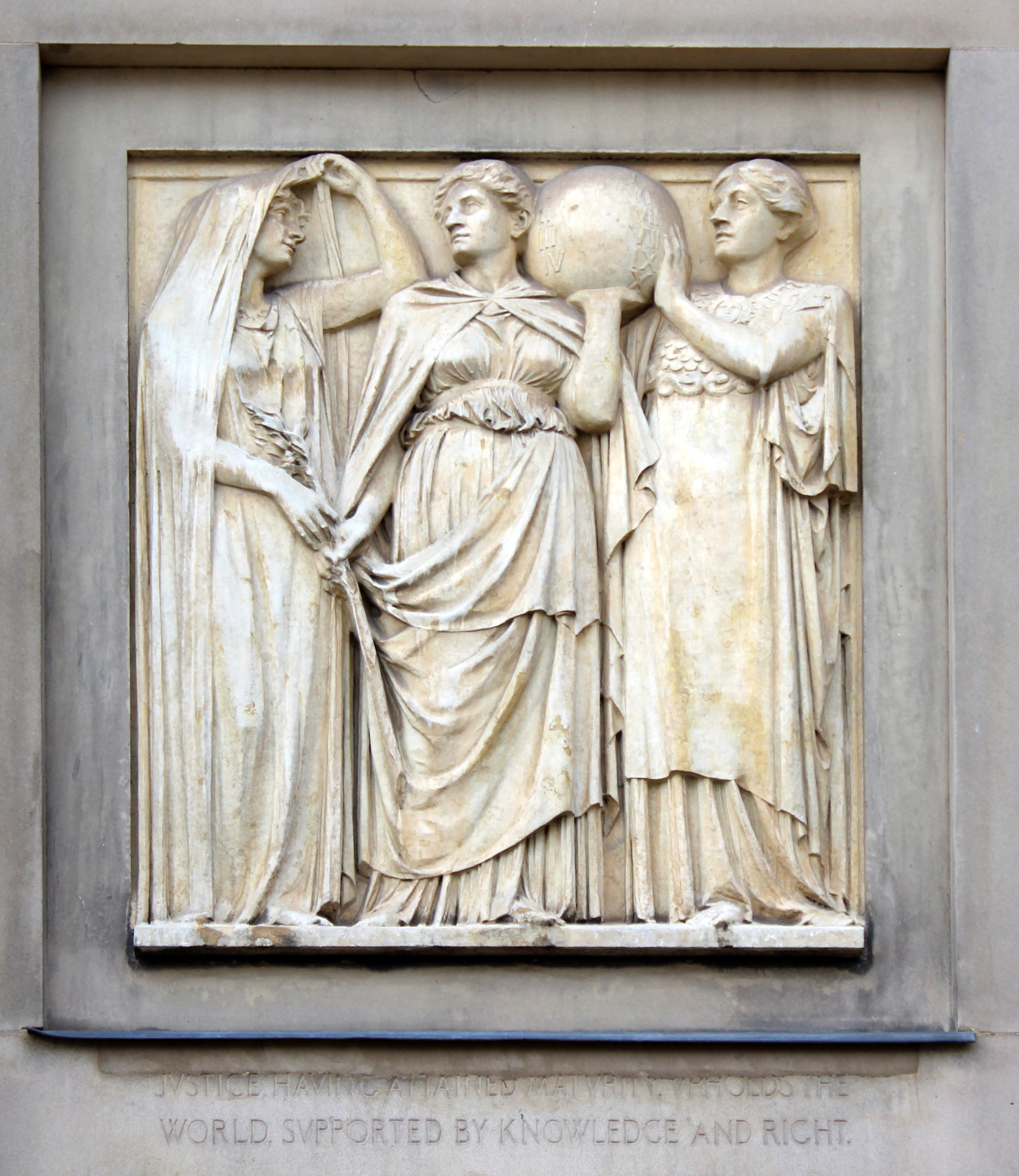
Mature Justice holds a globe with the numbers 1 to 10, representing the Ten Commandments. Knowledge, on the left, hands Justice the rod of knowledge and raises her veil to show things once hidden are now revealed. Right helps Justice to hold the globe and wears a breastplate signifying protection from evil.

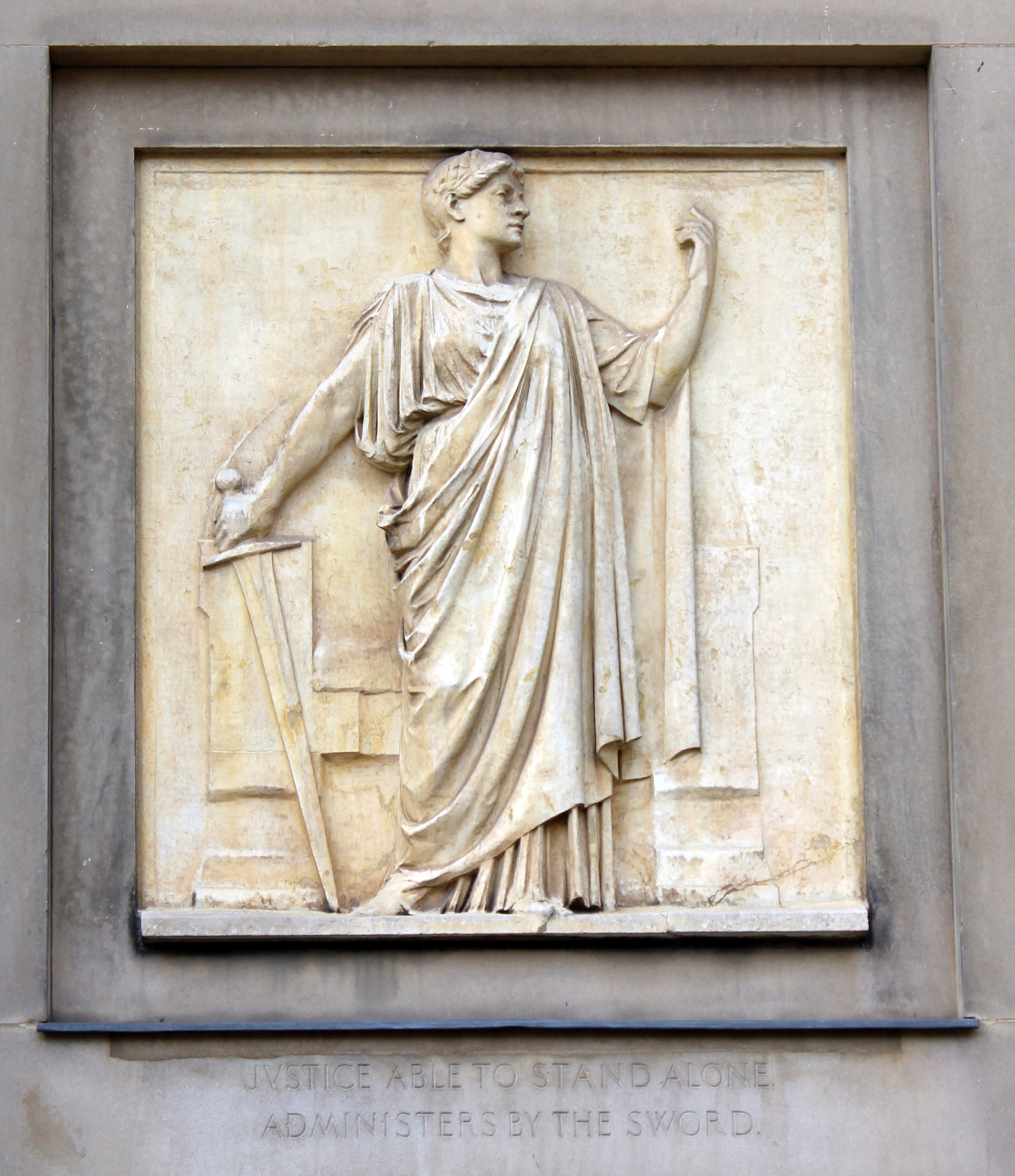
Justice stands alone and points upward to show that true justice is heaven-sent.

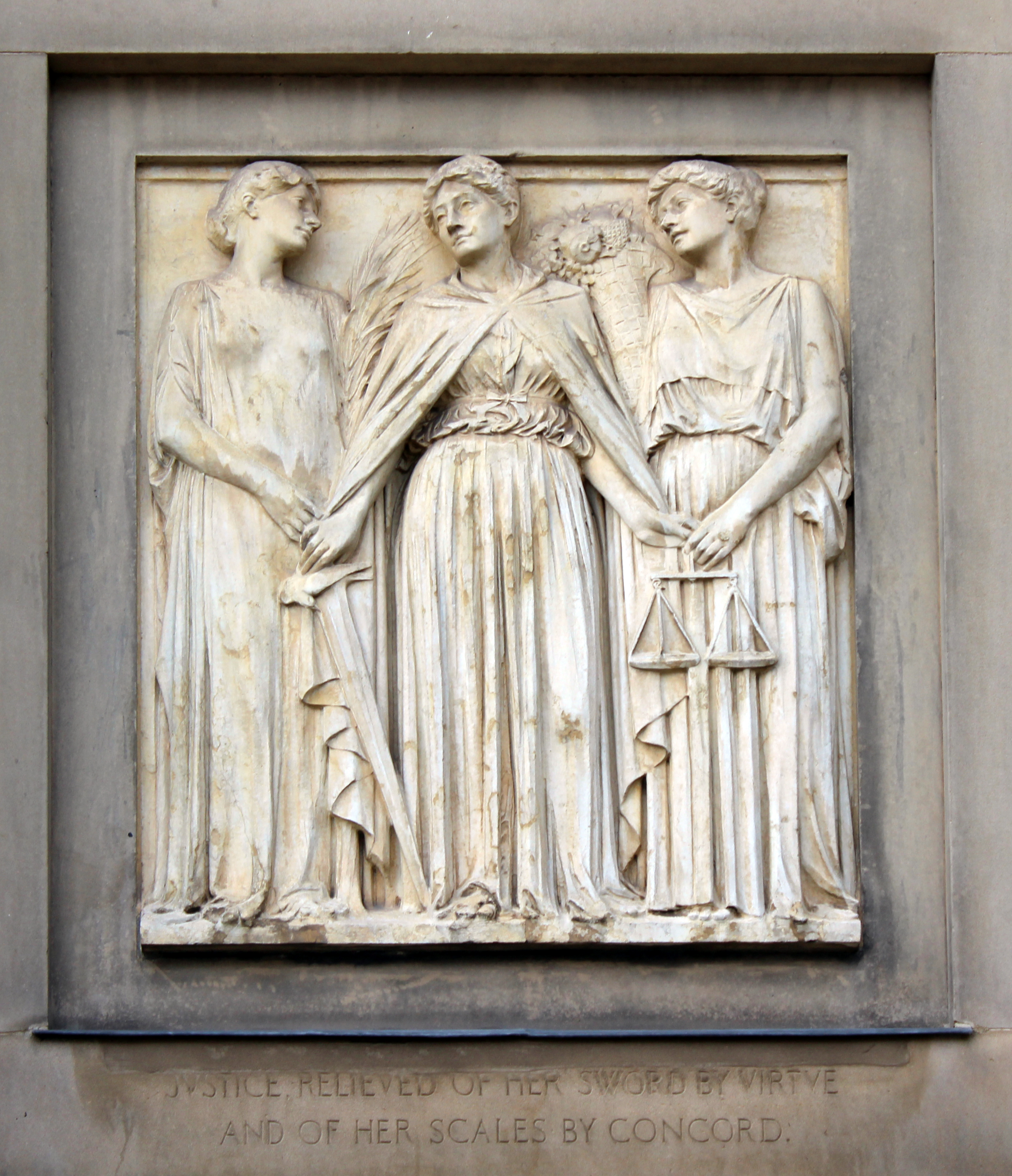
Justice is redundant as all crime is conquered; Virtue on the left passes to Justice the palm of victory and takes the sword. Justice passes the scales of justice to Concord.

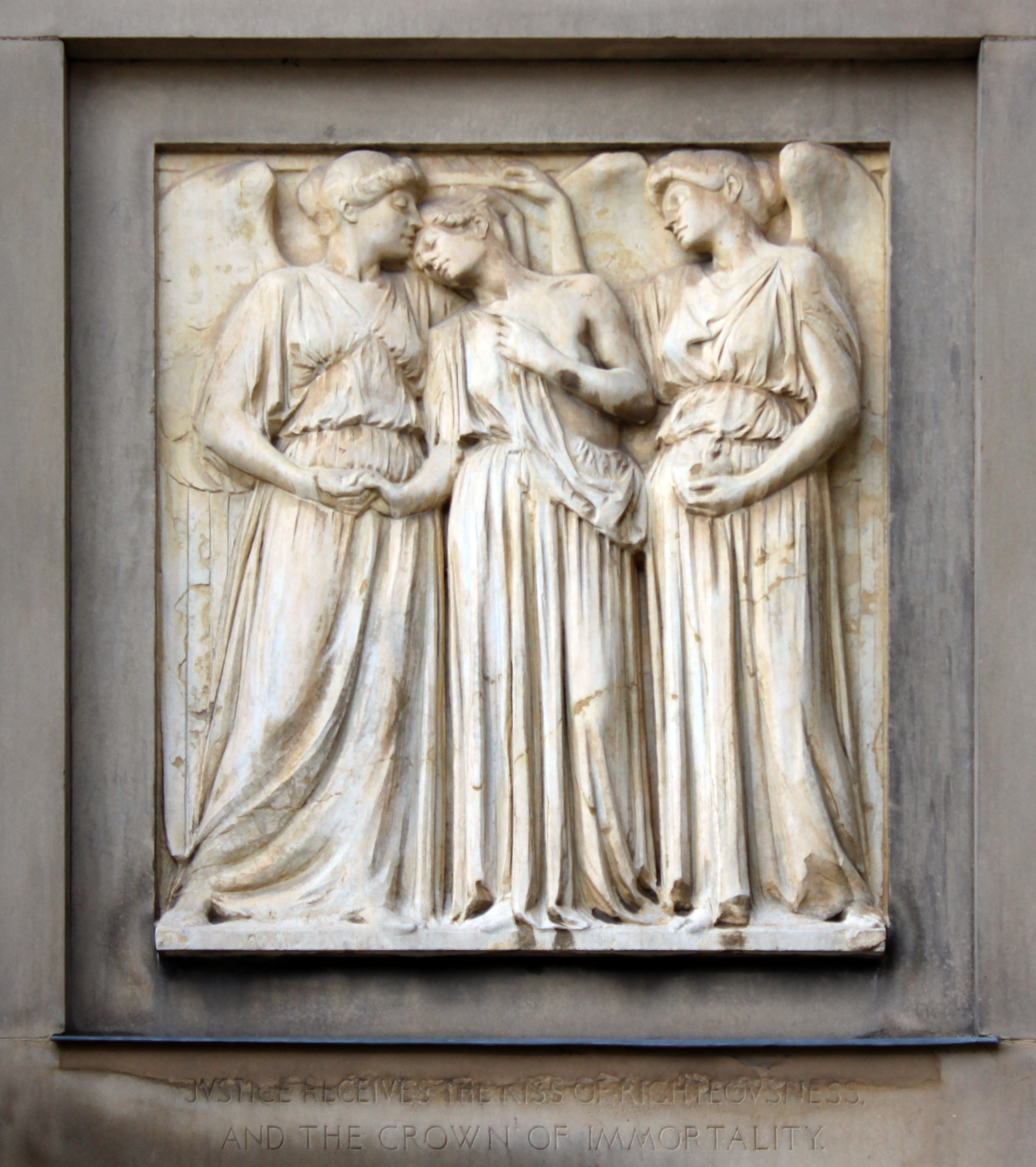
Justice receives a kiss from Righteousness and the crown of immortality from Glory, who holds a flaming heart signifying divine love.

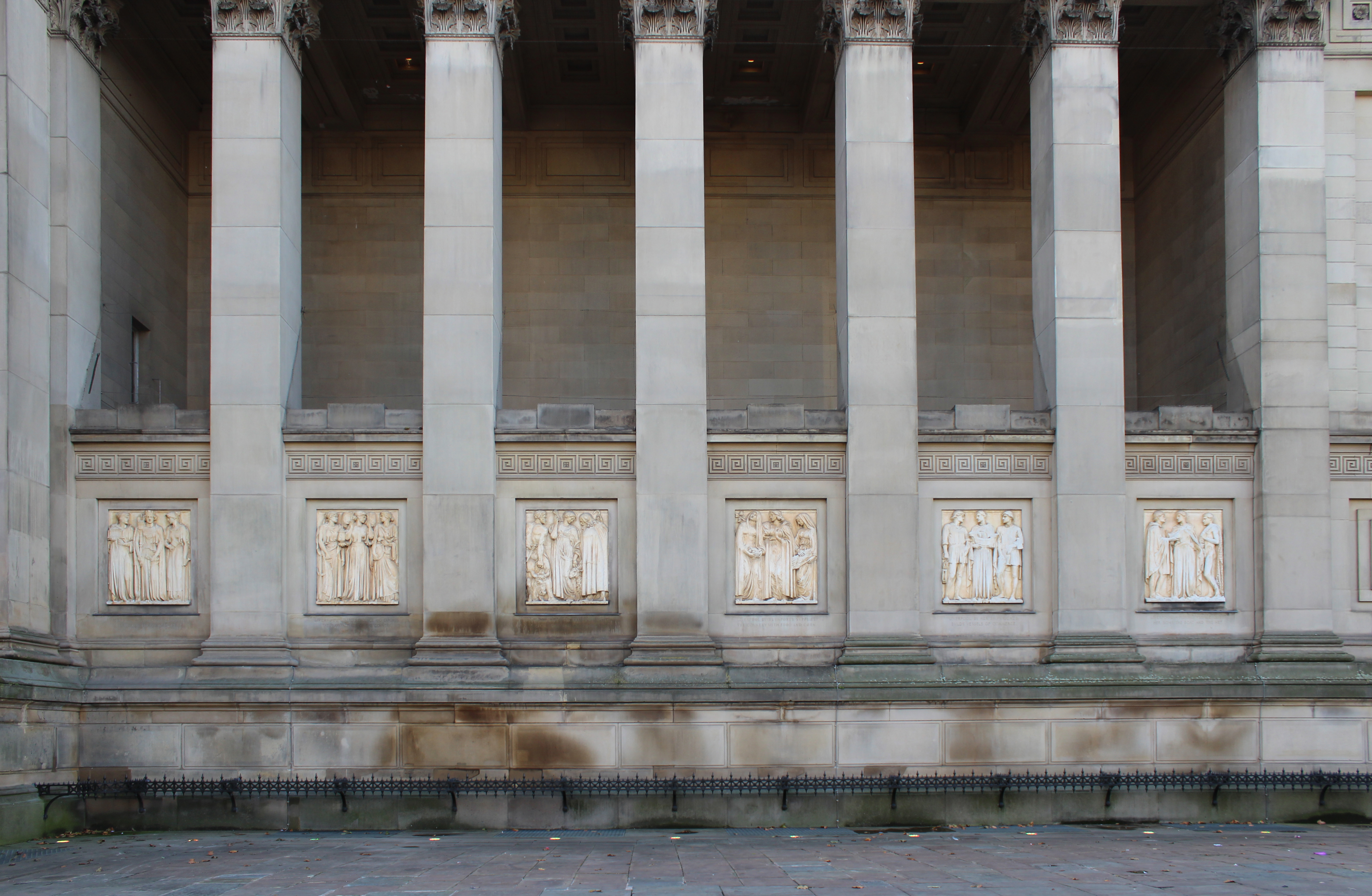
Relief sculptures at northern end of the east front 1895-1901 (Theme is the growth of Liverpool) by Thomas Stirling Lee, C.J. Allen & Conrad Dressler

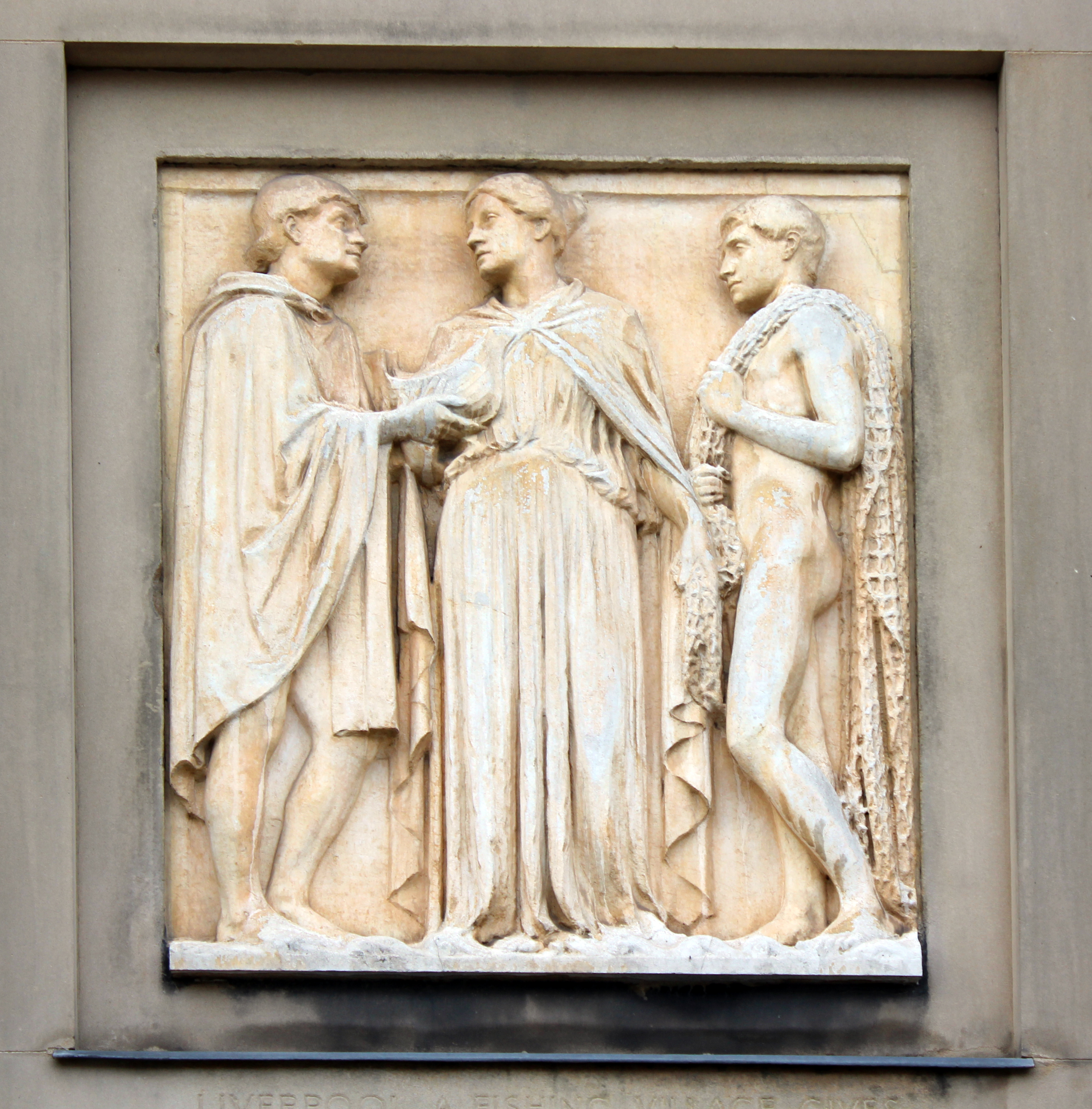
Signifies the development of Liverpool from a small fishing village to a thriving port.

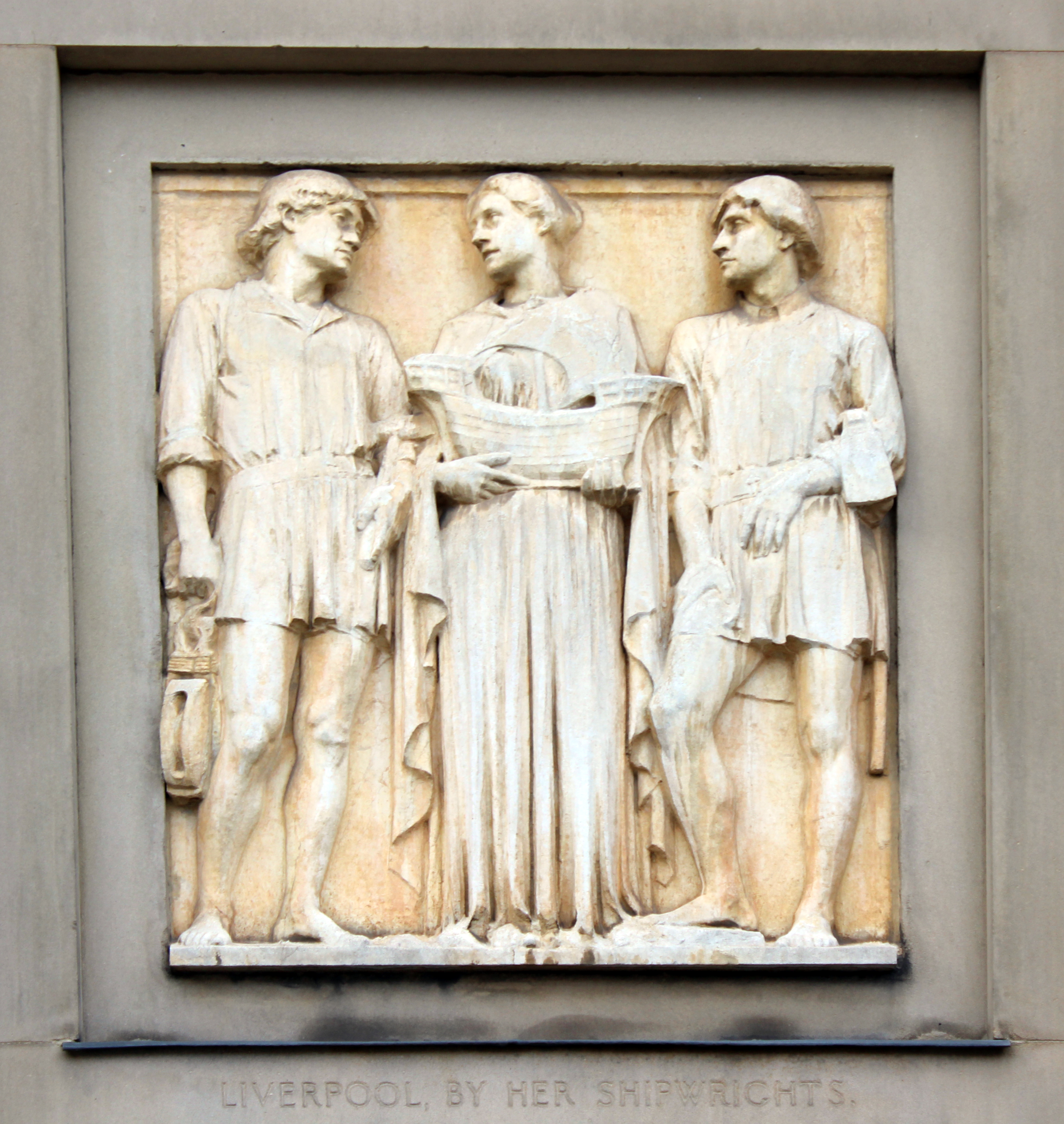
Signifies Liverpool's importance in shipbuilding and shipping.

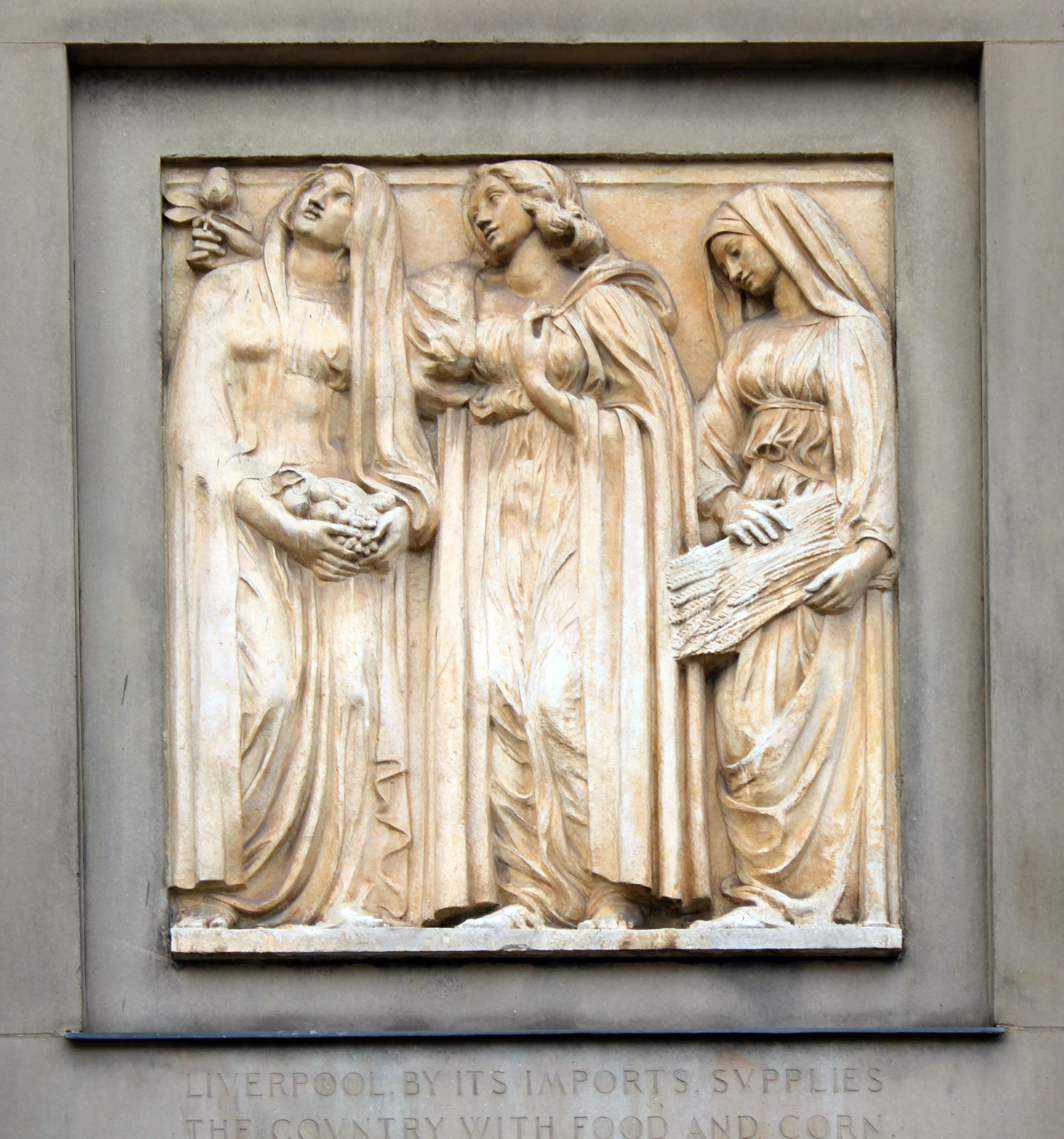
Liverpool supports the whole country by shipping food and corn.

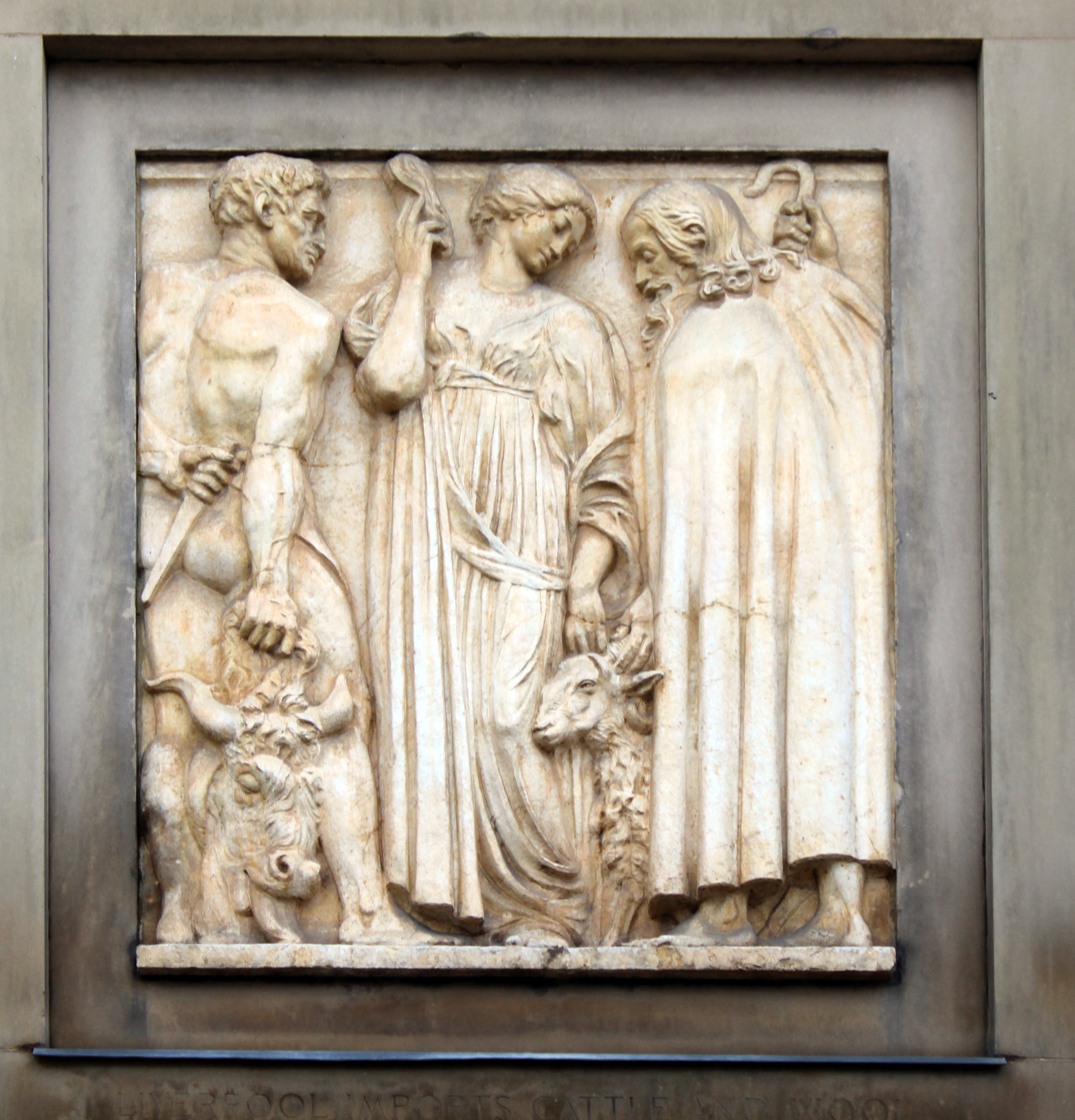
Liverpool holds aloft a purse of plenty with which to buy goods. The figure on the left represents the transportation of meat and the shepherd on the right the importance of wool.

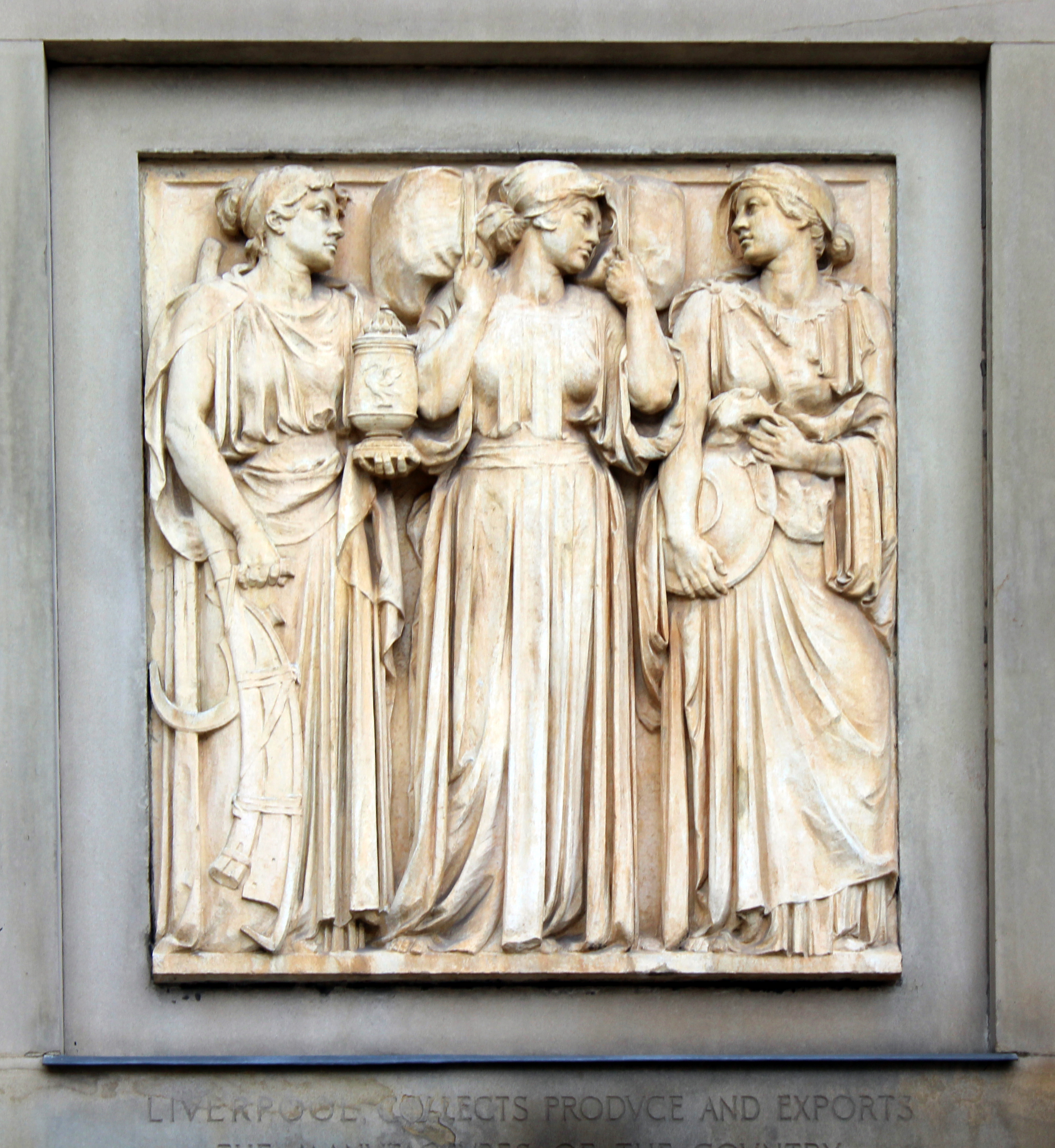
Representing commerce, Liverpool carries a bale of cotton. The figure on the left represents agriculture and that on the right carries a bowl as an example of manufactured goods.

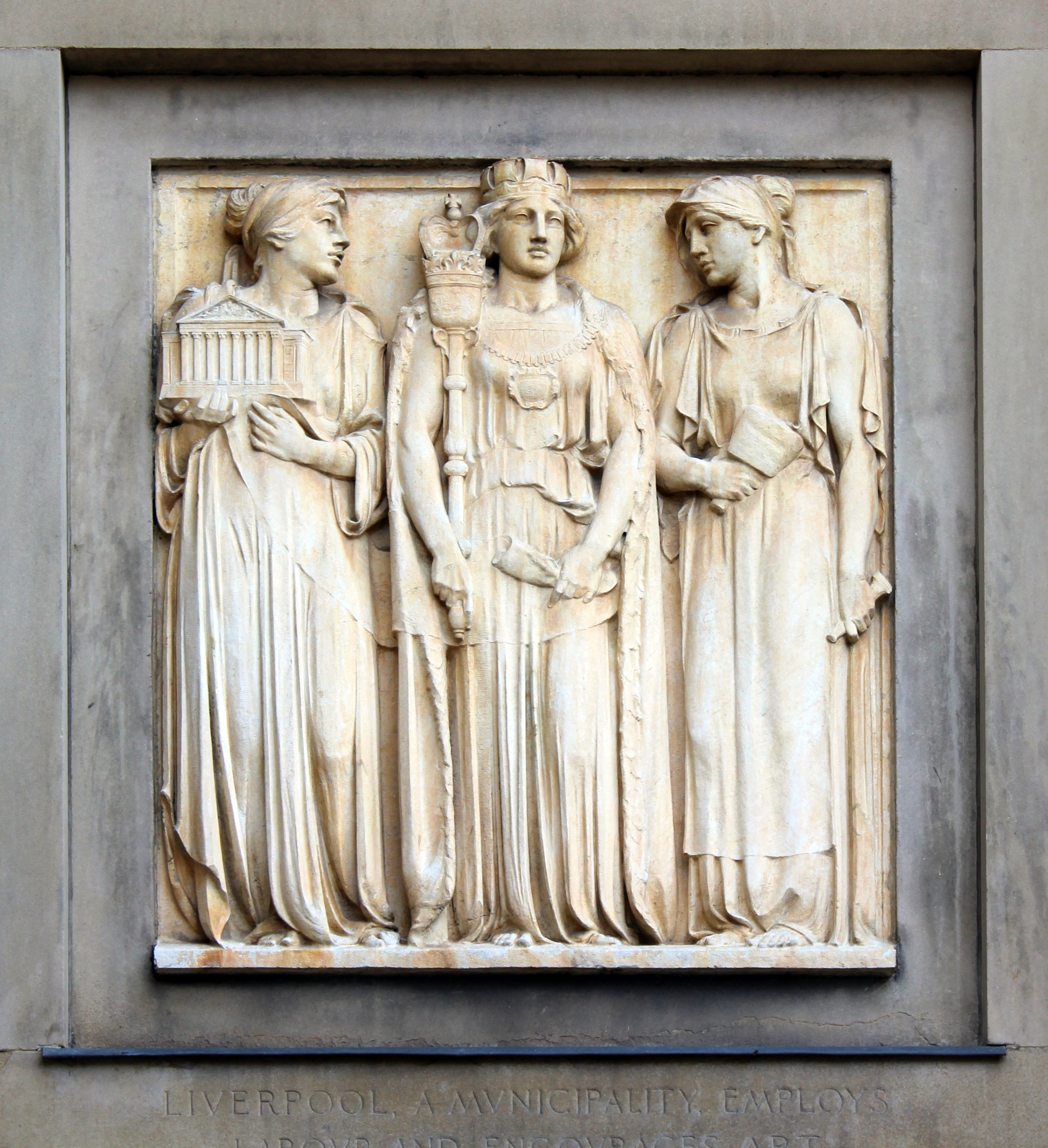
Liverpool wears regalia of office, flanked by Art (holding a model of the south facade of St George's Hall) on the left and Labour on the right
External features

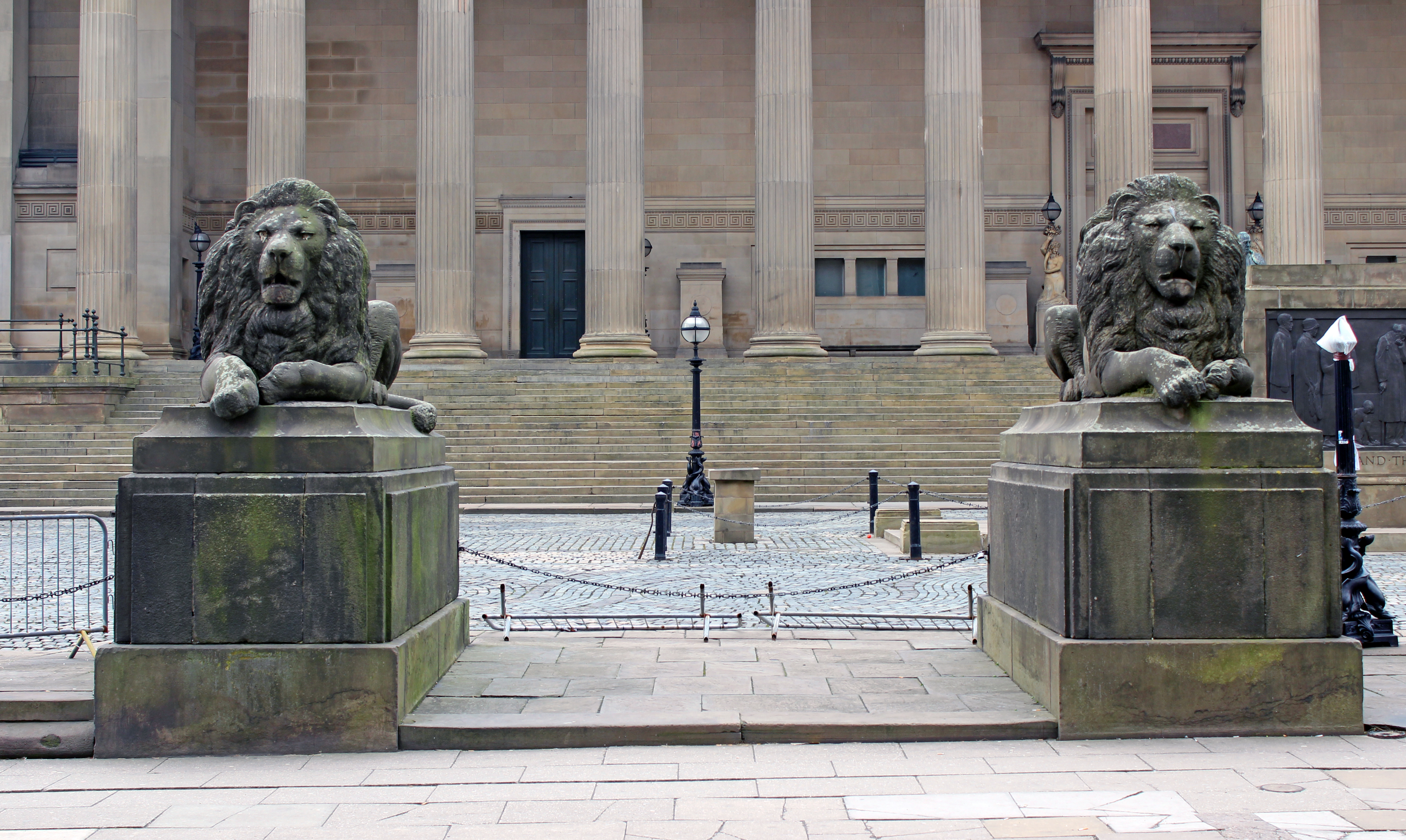
Two of the four lions designed by Cockerell, sculpted 1856 by W.G. Nicholl (moved to present position in 1864)

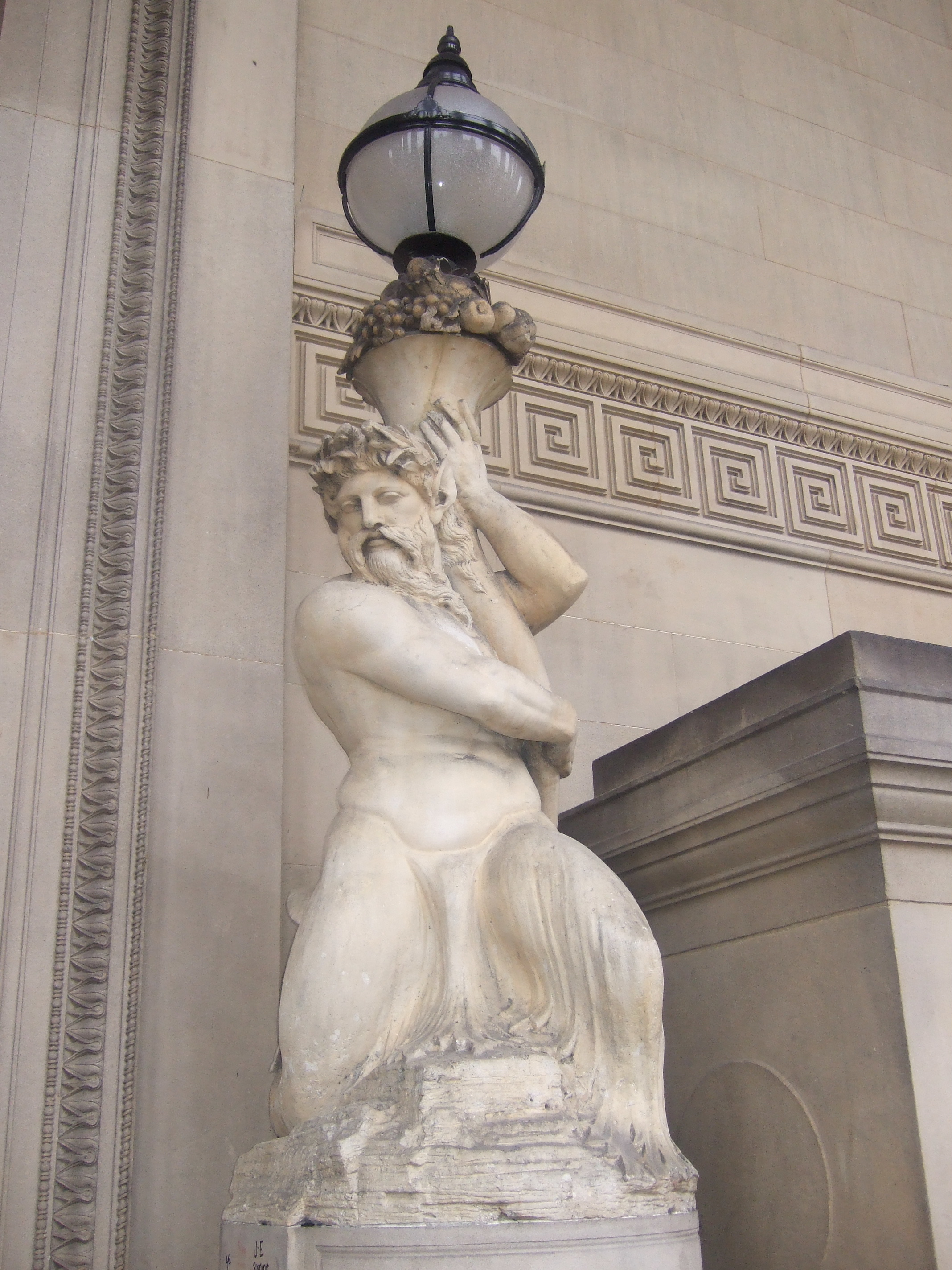
Lampholder, eastern elevation, in the form of a Triton holding a Cornucopia, sculpted by W.G. Nicholl

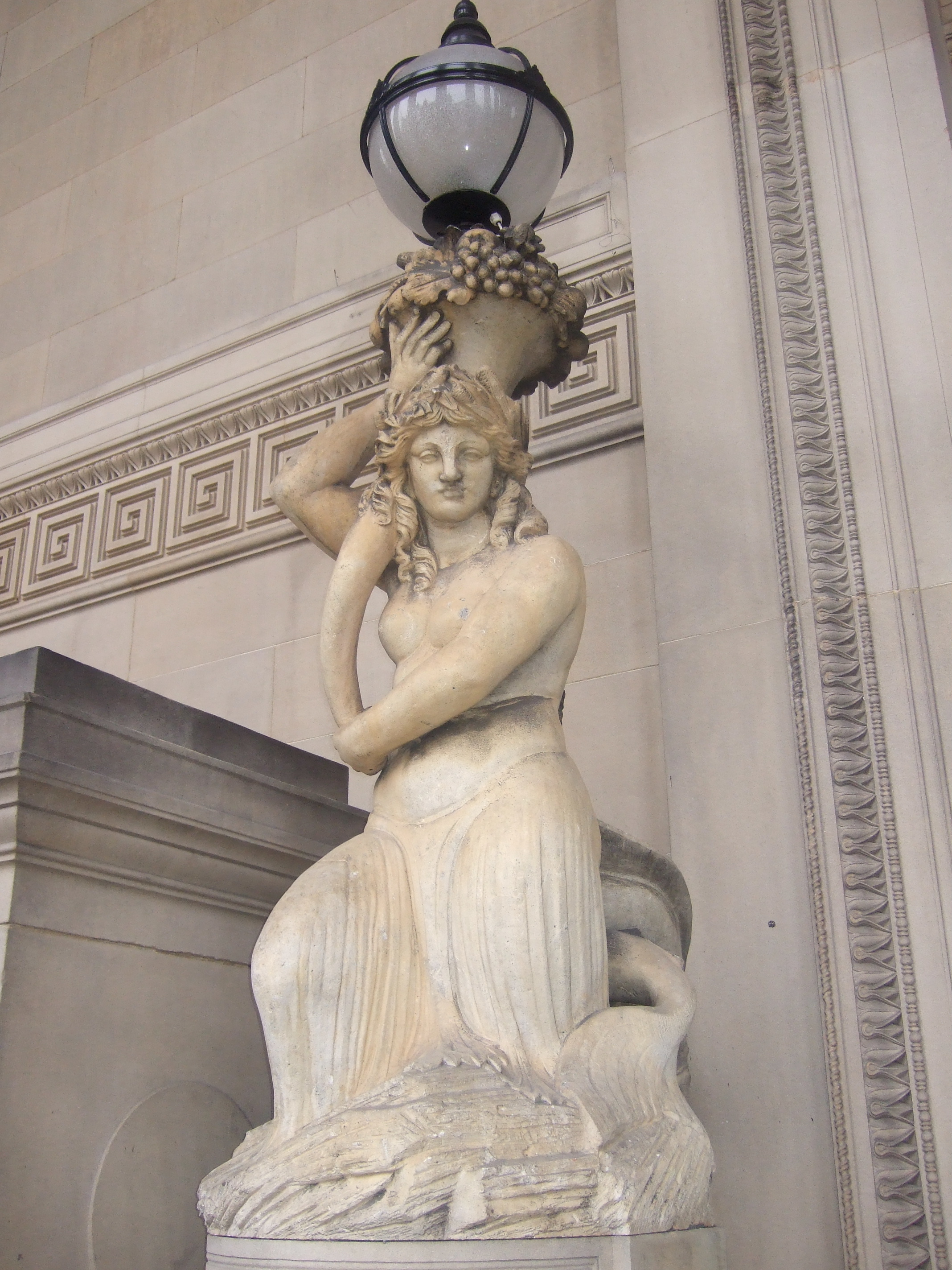
Lampholder, eastern elevation, in the form of a Nereid holding a Cornucopia, sculpted by W.G. Nicholl

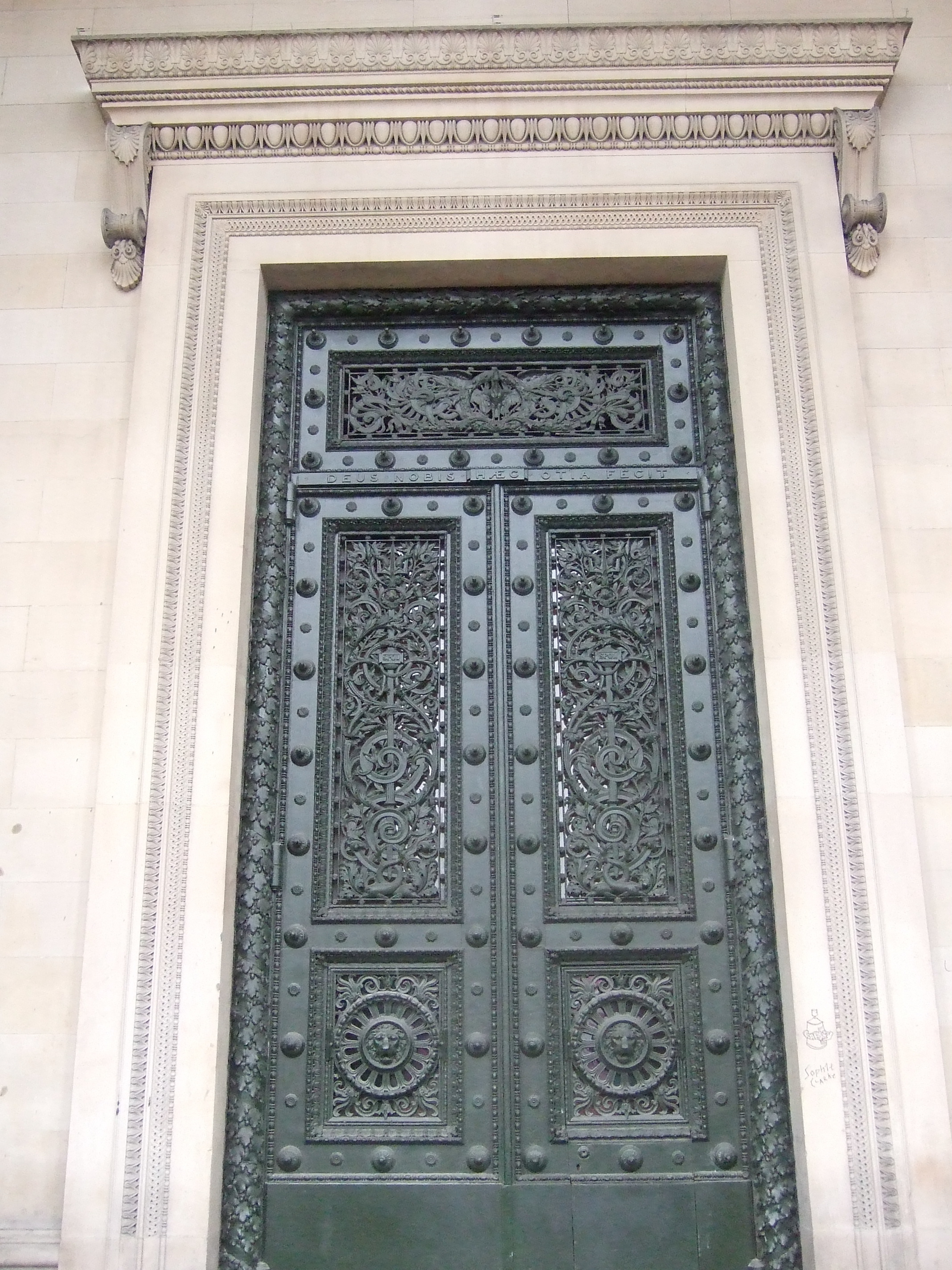
The door beneath the south portico

=== Interior ===
The main entrance crosses a corridor and leads into the Great Hall. This measures 169 feet (52 m) by 77 feet (23 m) and is 82 feet (25 m) high. The inspiration for the Great Hall are the Baths of Caracalla. The roof is a tunnel vault, built of hollow brick was designed by Robert Rawlinson completed 1849, it is carried on eight columns, 18 feet (5 m) in height, of polished red Cairngall granite, these reduce the span to 65 feet (20 m), the spandrels contain allegorical plaster work angels, twelve in total, designed by Cockerell, representing fortitude, prudence, science, art, justice and temperance etc. The vault also decorated with plaster work by Cockerell, contains coffering, the centres of the main coffers have coat of arms of Liverpool, or the coats of arms of Lancashire or St George and the dragon, in the centre of the vault are the Royal Arms used by Queen Victoria this is above a matching coat of arms in the Minton floor. The walls have niches for statues. The highly decorated floor consists of Minton encaustic tile and it is usually covered by a removable floor to protect it. It contains over 30,000 tiles. The doors are bronze and have openwork panels which incorporate the letters SPQL (the Senate and the People of Liverpool) making an association with the SPQR badge of ancient Rome. The ten brass and bronze chandeliers in the Great Hall, designed by Cockerell, originally powered by town gas weigh 15 cwt, are decorated with prows of ships, heads of Neptune and Liver birds.

The interior of the Great Hall

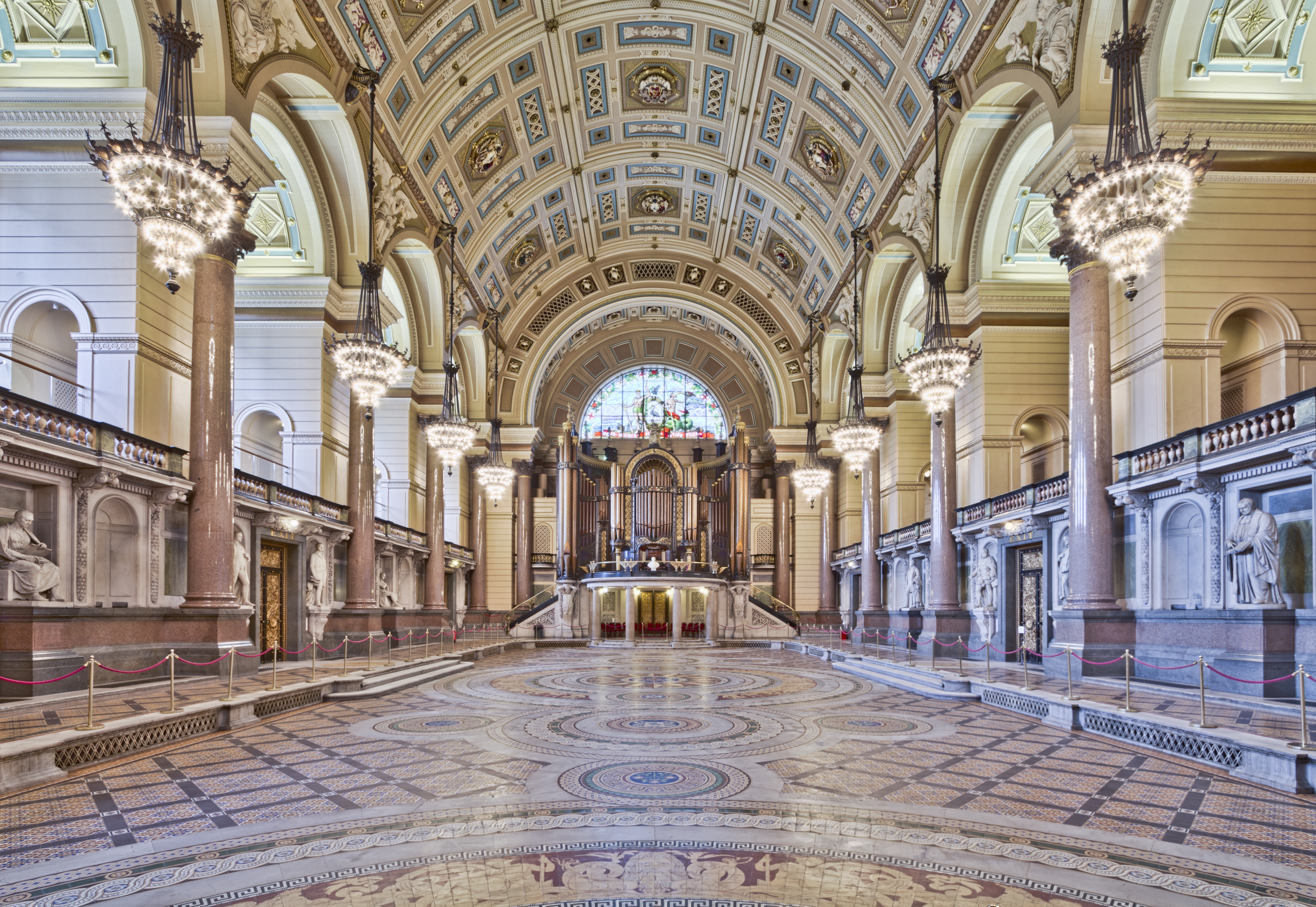
Interior view looking north of Great Hall, the floor, designed by Cockerell, executed by Mintons has about 30,000 tiles

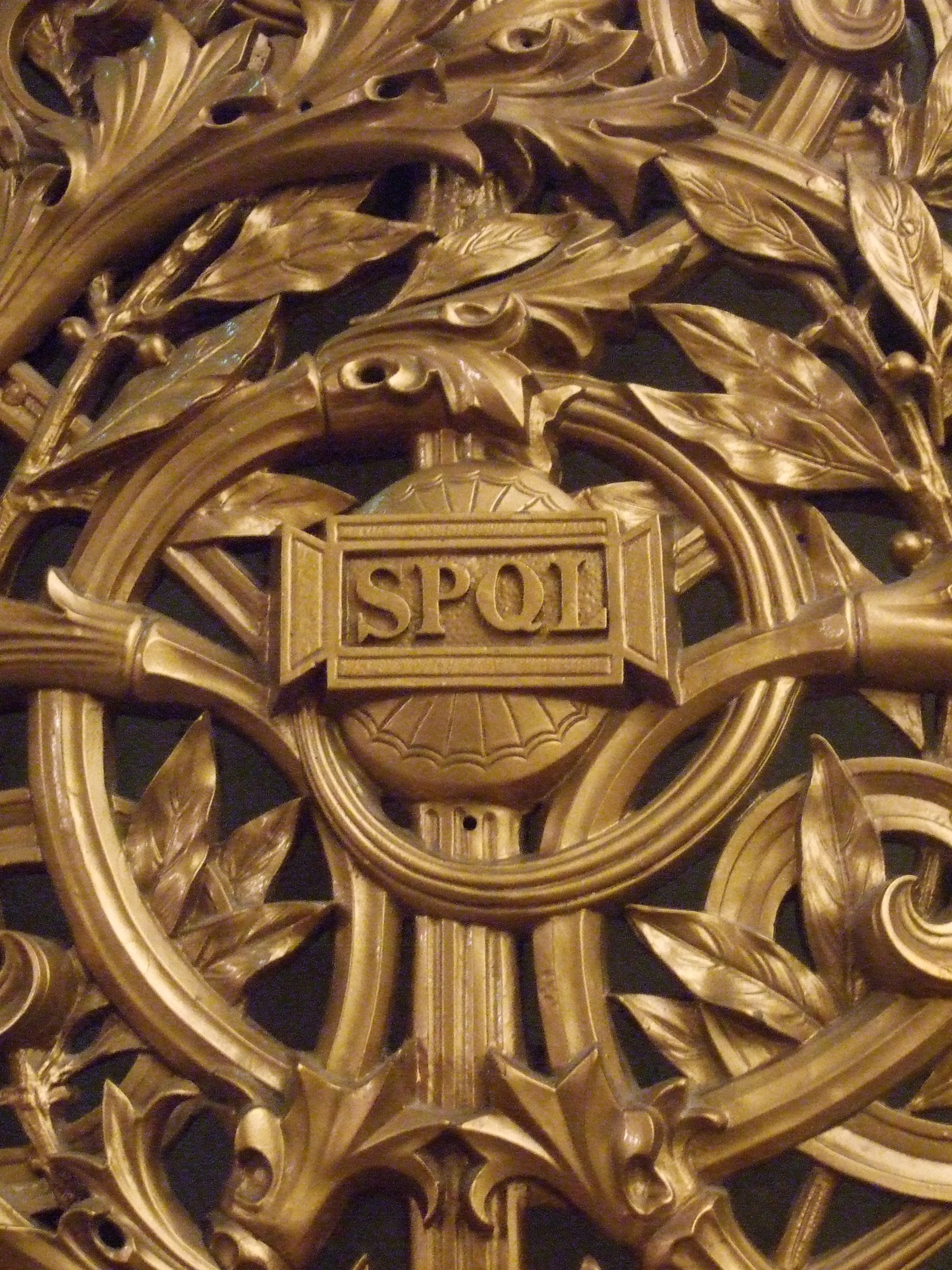
Senatus Populusque Liverpoliensis

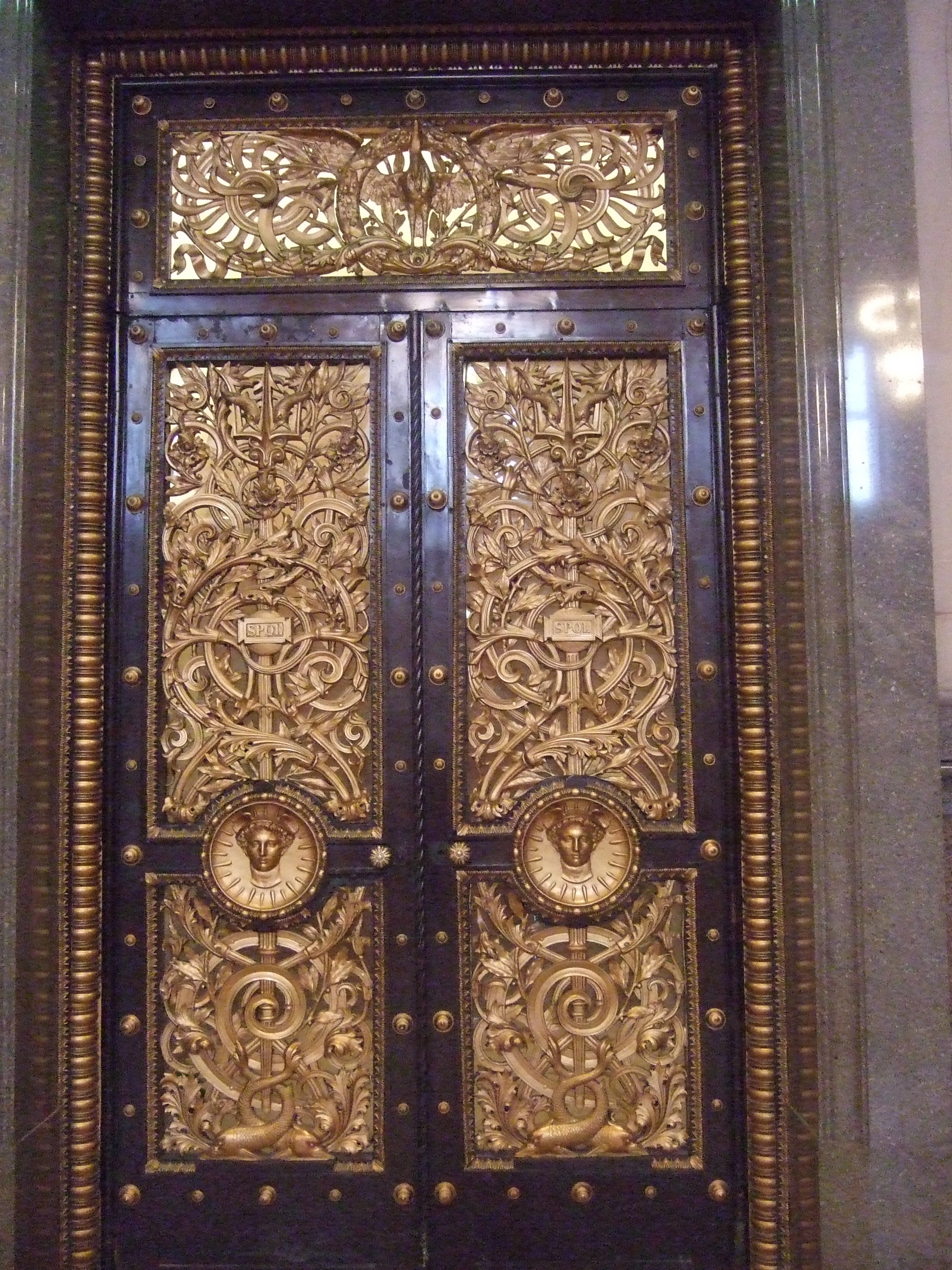
Bronze doors, designed by Cockerell, 12 feet (4 m) 8 inches (20 cm) high by 6 feet (2 m) 4 inches (10 cm) wide and weighs 74 cwt, there are three on each side of the hall, also three similar doors at the south end lead to the Crown Court and a smaller one is beneath the organ.

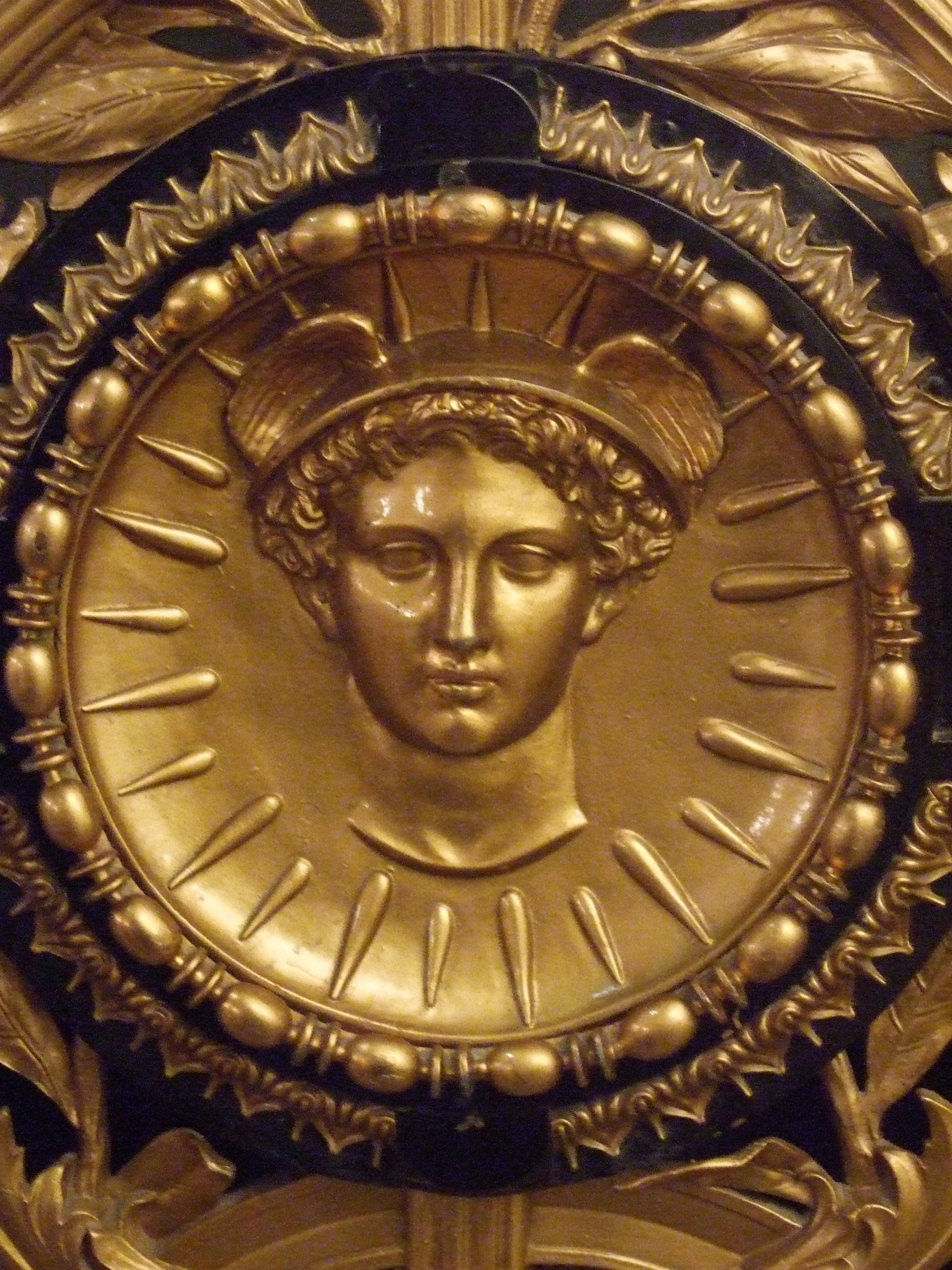
Head of Mercury on door

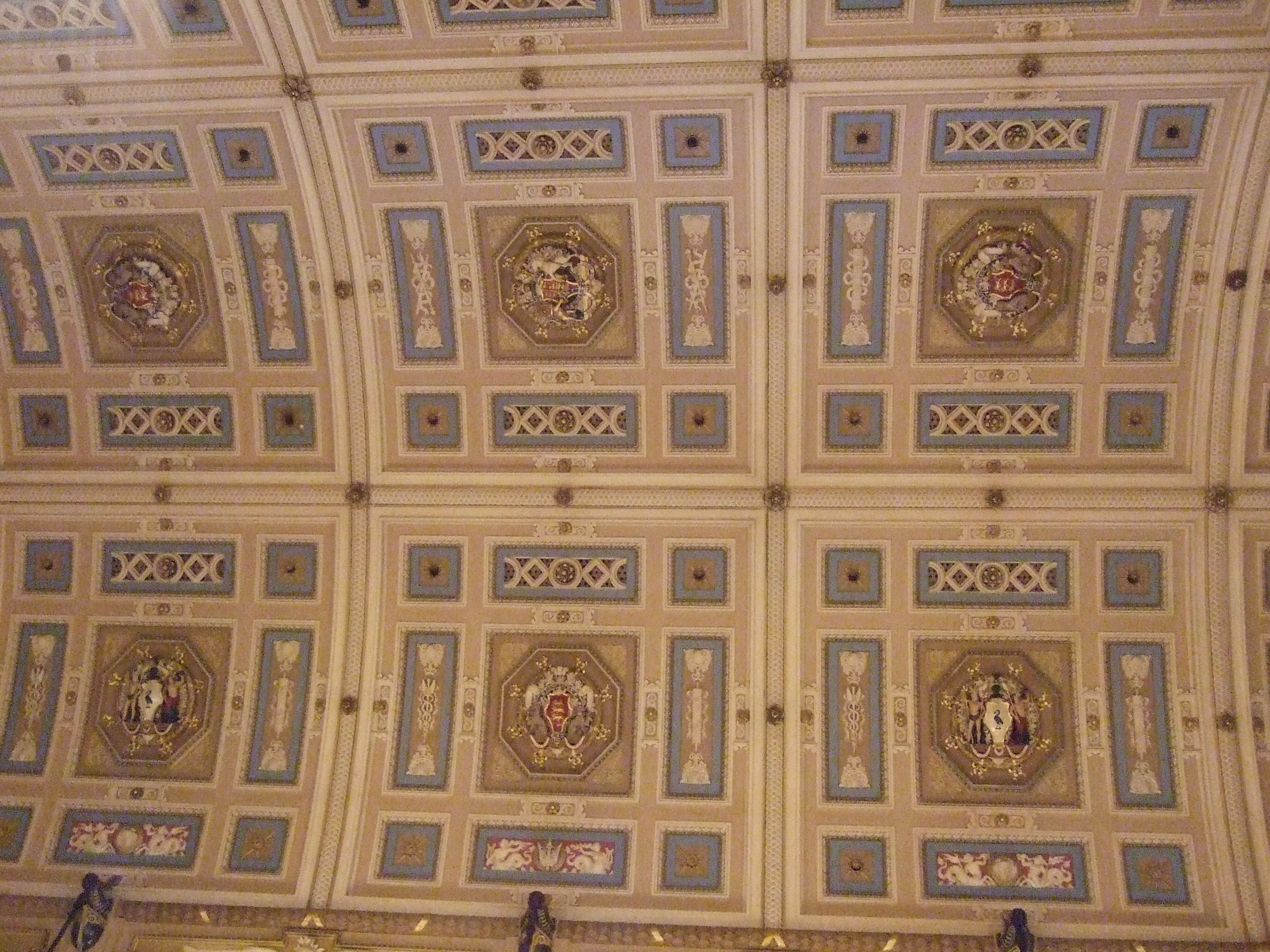
Completed 1849, at 65 feet (20 m) the Widest barrel-vaulted ceiling in the UK, it is 82 feet (25 m) high (the room is 77 feet (23 m) wide but the columns account for the difference) it is 169 feet (52 m) in length, engineer Robert Rawlinson, plasterwork designed by Cockerell

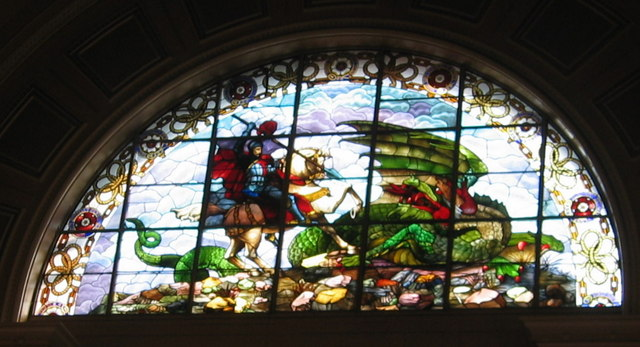
South lunette stained-glass window of St. George slaying the dragon, (1883–84) by Forrest and Sons of Liverpool

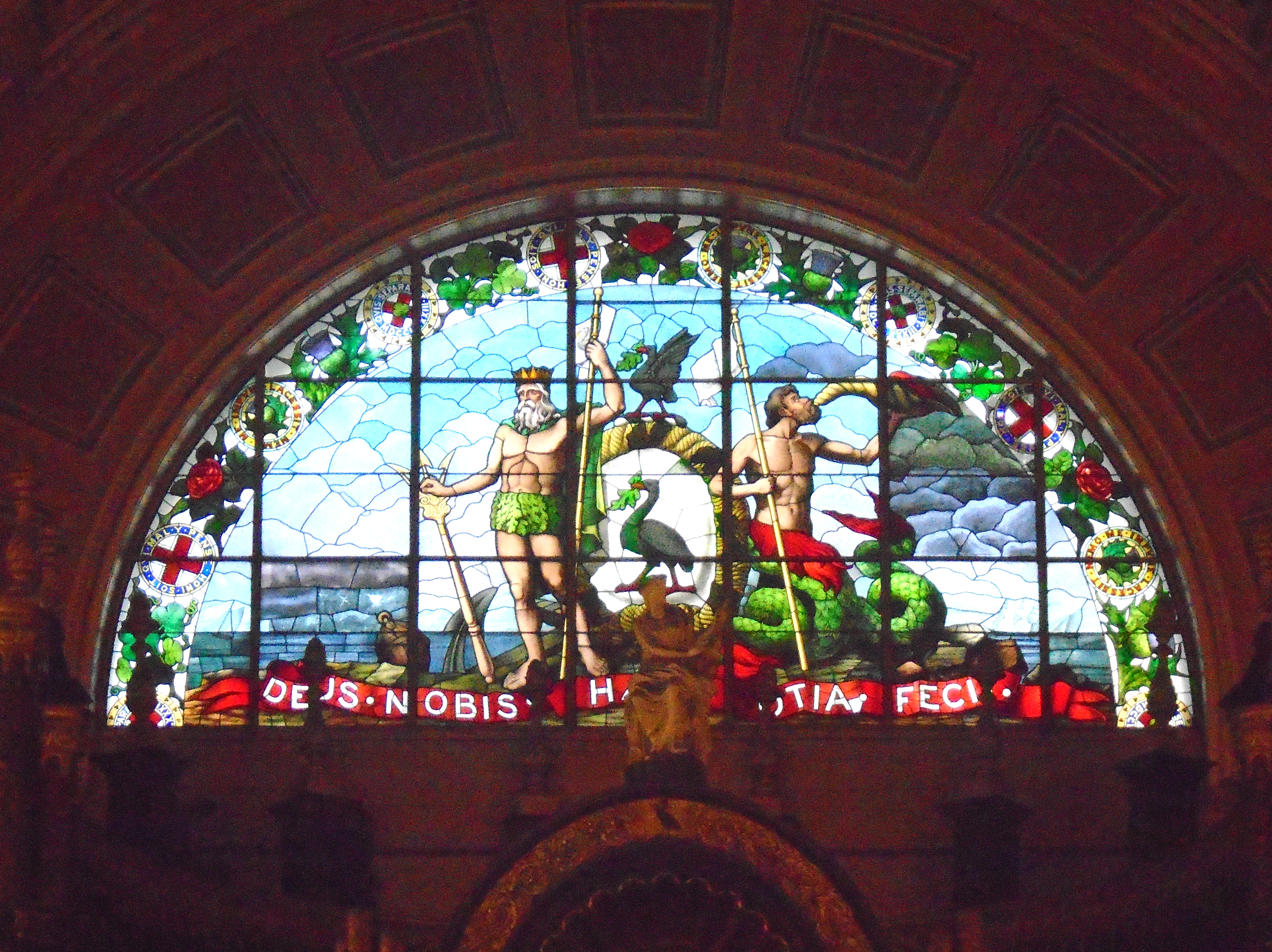
North lunette stained-glass window of coat of arms of Liverpool, flanked by Neptune and a triton, (1883–84) by Forrest and Sons of Liverpool

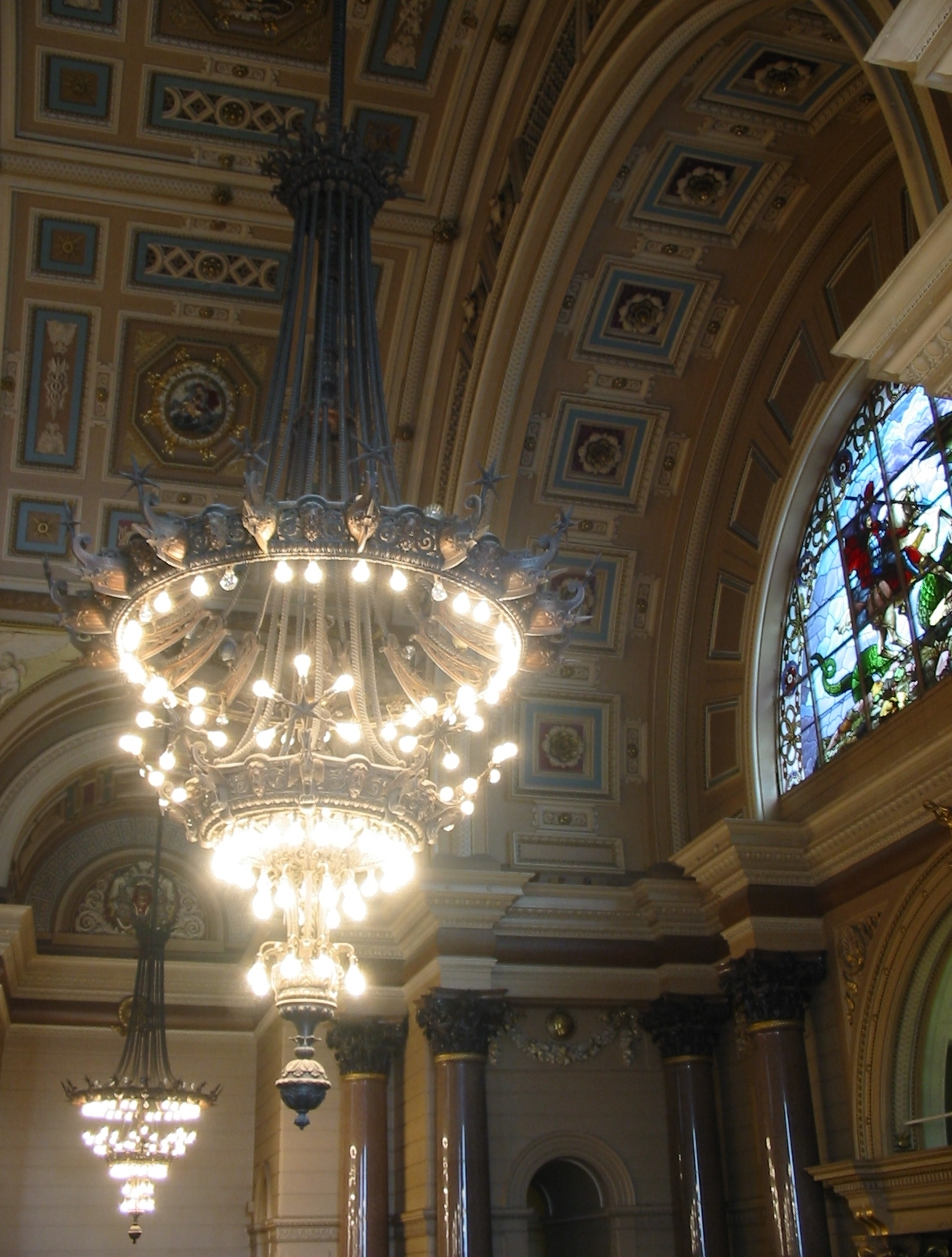
One of the ten chandeliers, brass and bronze, decorated with prows of ships, heads of Neptune and Liver birds, by Cockerell

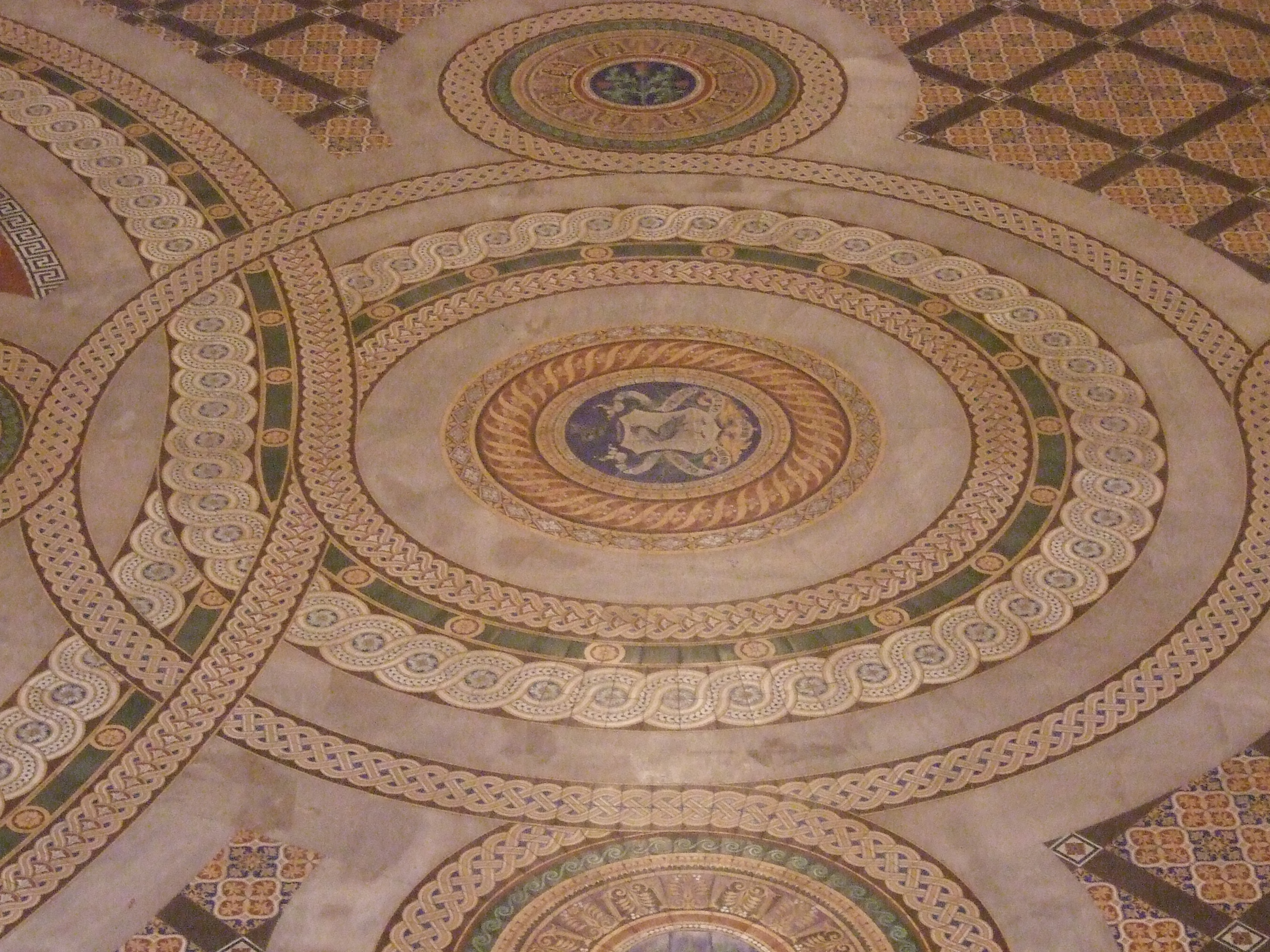
Minton Floor, show Liverpool's coat of arms, surrounded by the symbols of England, Scotland and Ireland, the rose, thistle (only one visible in photo) and shamrock.

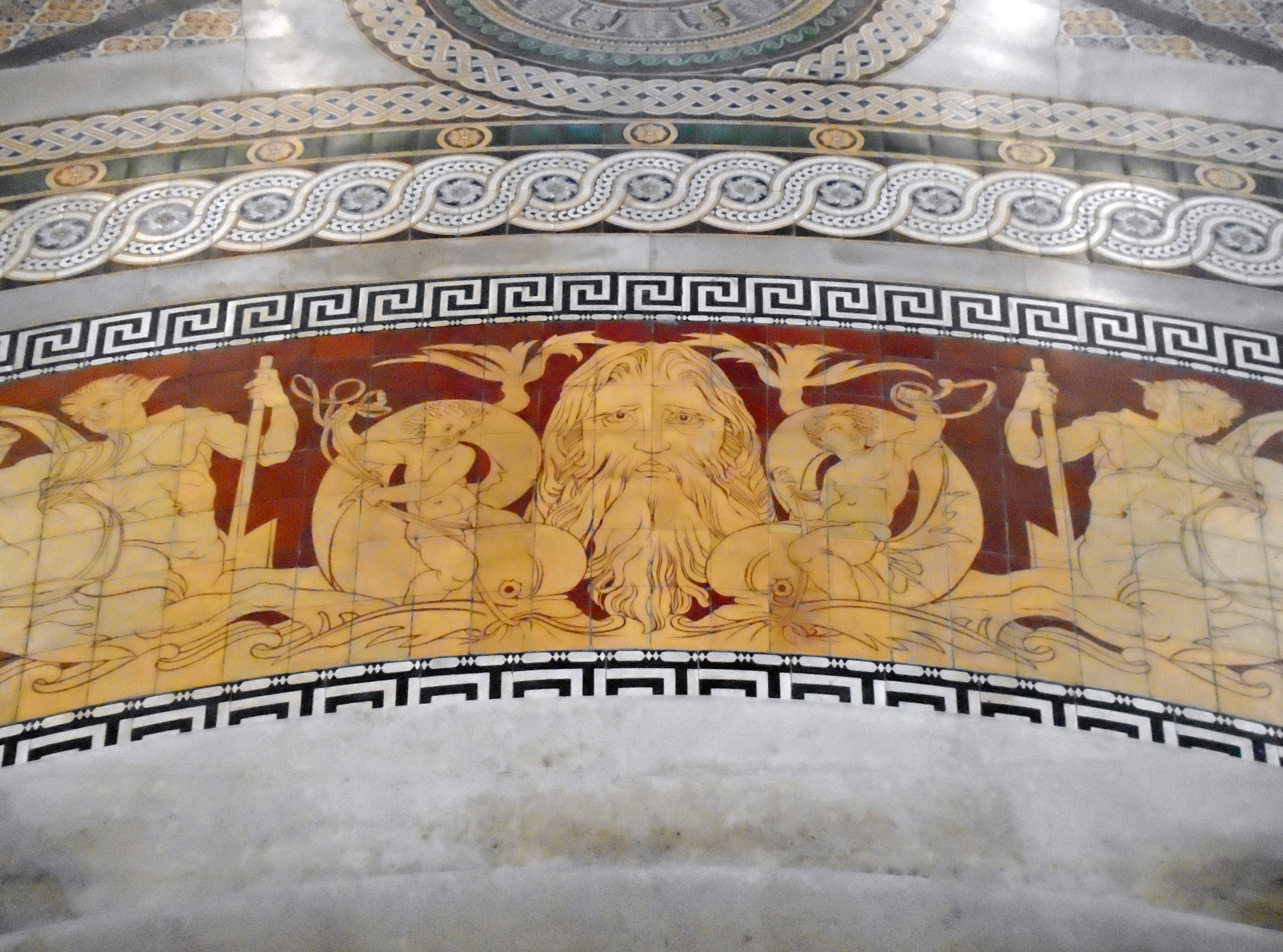
Minton floor, showing frieze designed by Alfred Stevens, it consists of Neptune, tritons, nerids and boys on dolphins.

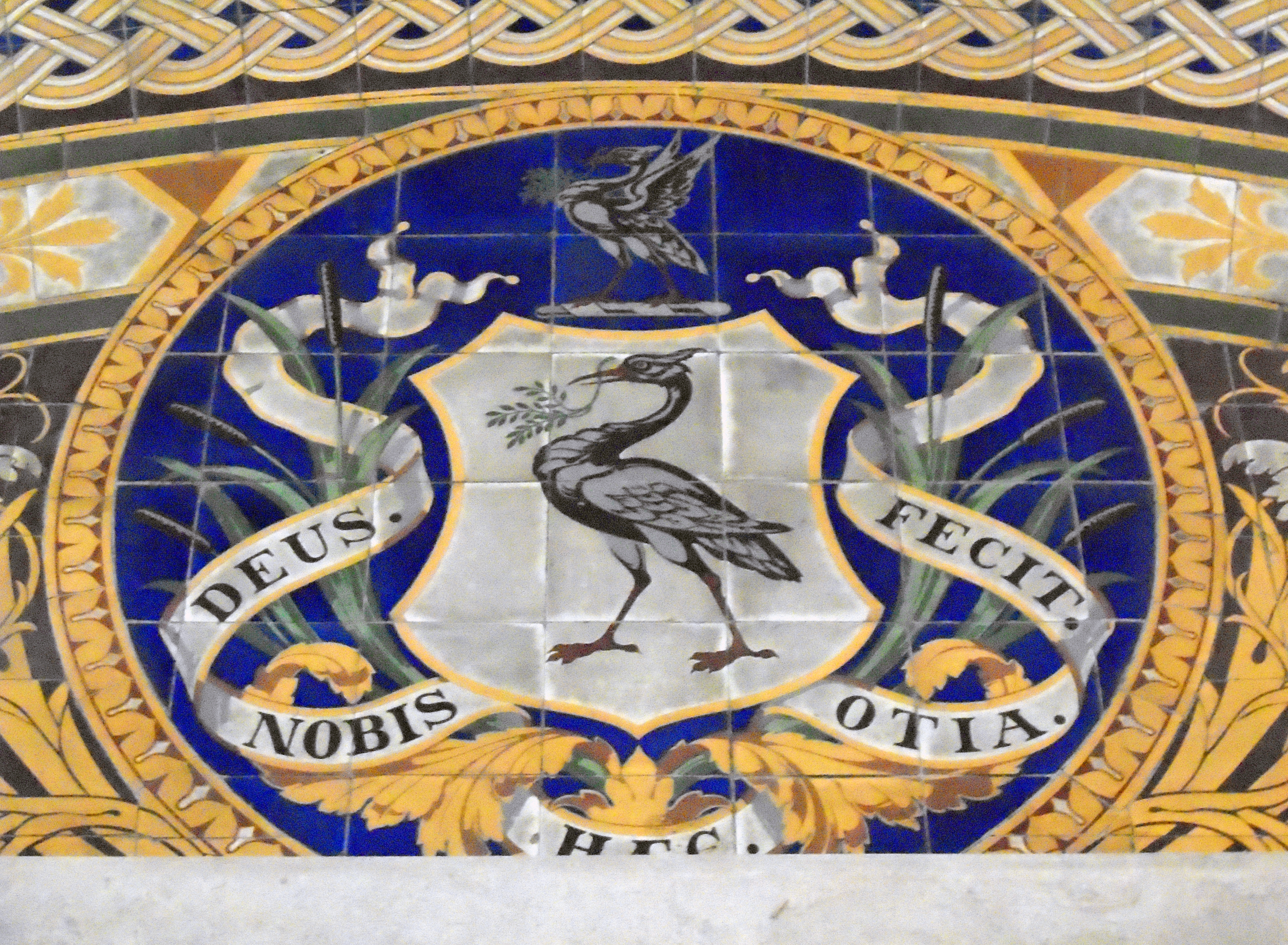
Minton floor, coat of arms of Liverpool,'Deus Nobis Haec Otia Fecit' is from Virgil, translates as 'God has given to us this leisure'.

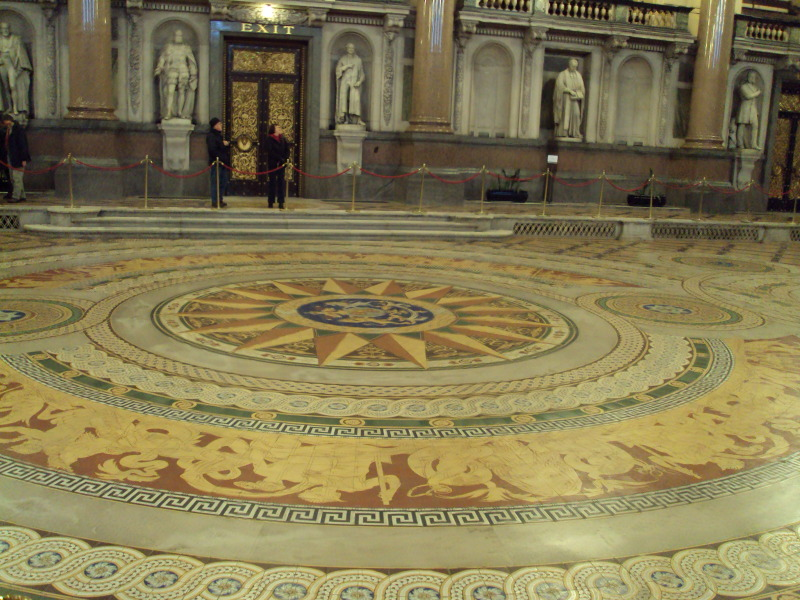
Minton floor, central roundel, this contains The Royal Coat of Arms used by Queen Victoria

The organ is at the north end and at the south end is a round arch supporting an entablature between whose columns is a gate leading directly into the Crown Court. The niches contain the statues of William Roscoe by Chantrey, Sir William Brown by Patrick MacDowell, Robert Peel by Matthew Noble, George Stephenson by John Gibson, Hugh Boyd M‘Neile by George Gamon Adams, Edward Whitley by A. Bruce Joy, Samuel Robert Graves by G. G. Fontana, Rev. Jonathan Brooks by Benjamin Edward Spence, William Ewart Gladstone by John Adams-Acton, the 14th Earl of Derby by William Theed the Younger, the 16th Earl of Derby by F. W. Pomeroy, and Joseph Mayer by Fontana. In 2012 a statue of Kitty Wilkinson by Simon Smith was unveiled, the first in 101 years, and the first of a woman. The stained glass in the semicircular windows at each end of the hall was added in 1883–84 by Forrest and Son of Liverpool. Sharples and Pollard regard this as "one of the greatest Victorian interiors".

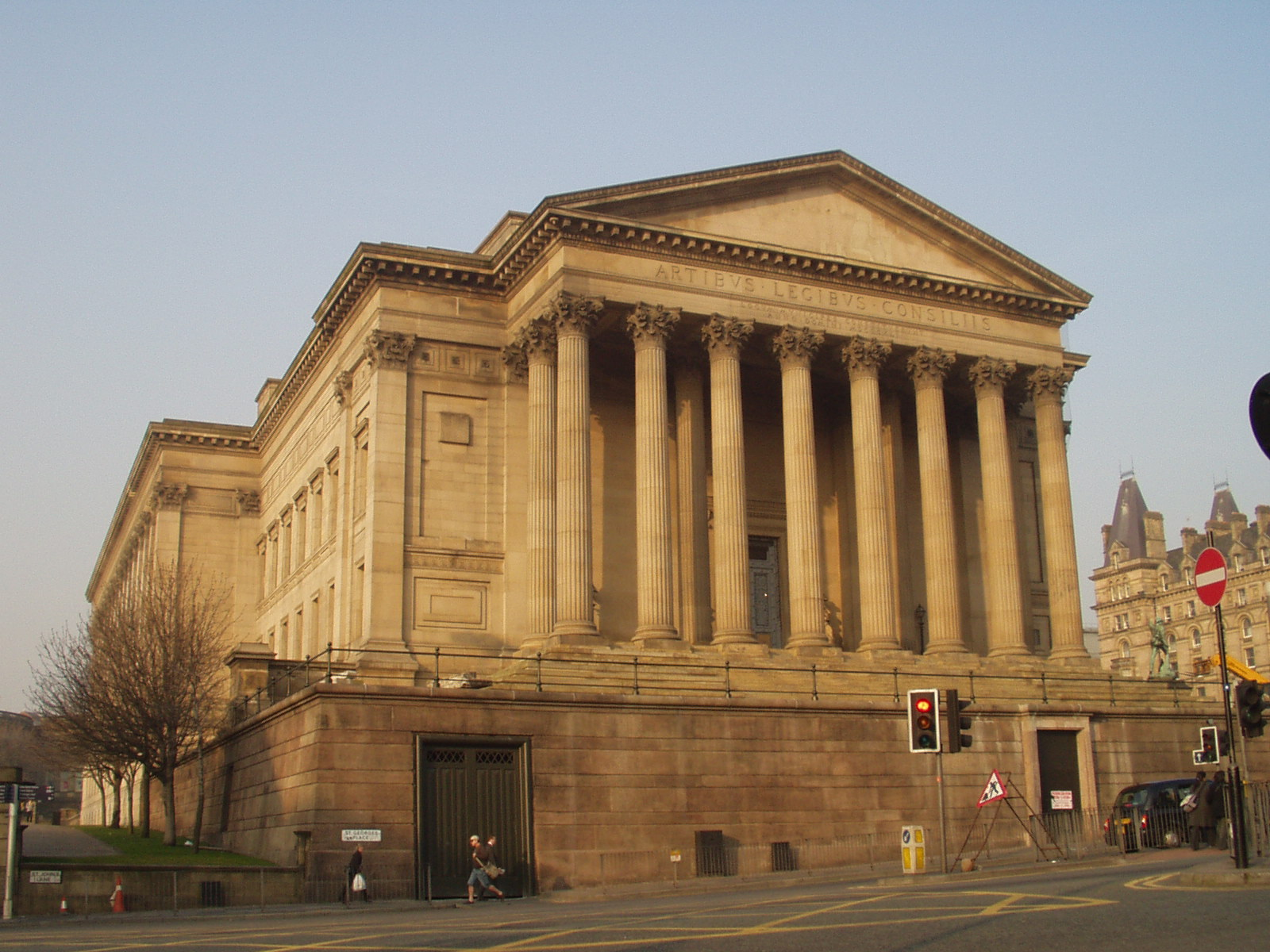
South side of St George's Hall showing the empty pediment that used to contain sculpture

The Crown Court has a tunnel vault on red granite columns and the Civil Court a coved ceiling on grey granite columns. The South Entrance Hall is approached through the portico, is low and has Ionic columns. Below this is a larger vaulted space which was adapted to form a new entrance in 2003–05. The North Entrance Hall has Doric columns on its landing and a Doric ambulatory around the apse with two bronze Torchères by Messengers of Birmingham decorated with allegorical scenes, the apse contains stairs, unlike the other main entrances where the stairs are external. A copy in plaster of part of the Parthenon frieze runs round its walls. In the centre of the south wall is a marble statue of Henry Booth shown standing up, carved 1874 by William Theed the Younger, placed here in 1877, flanking the statue are sculptures of caryatids.

Statues in the Great Hall

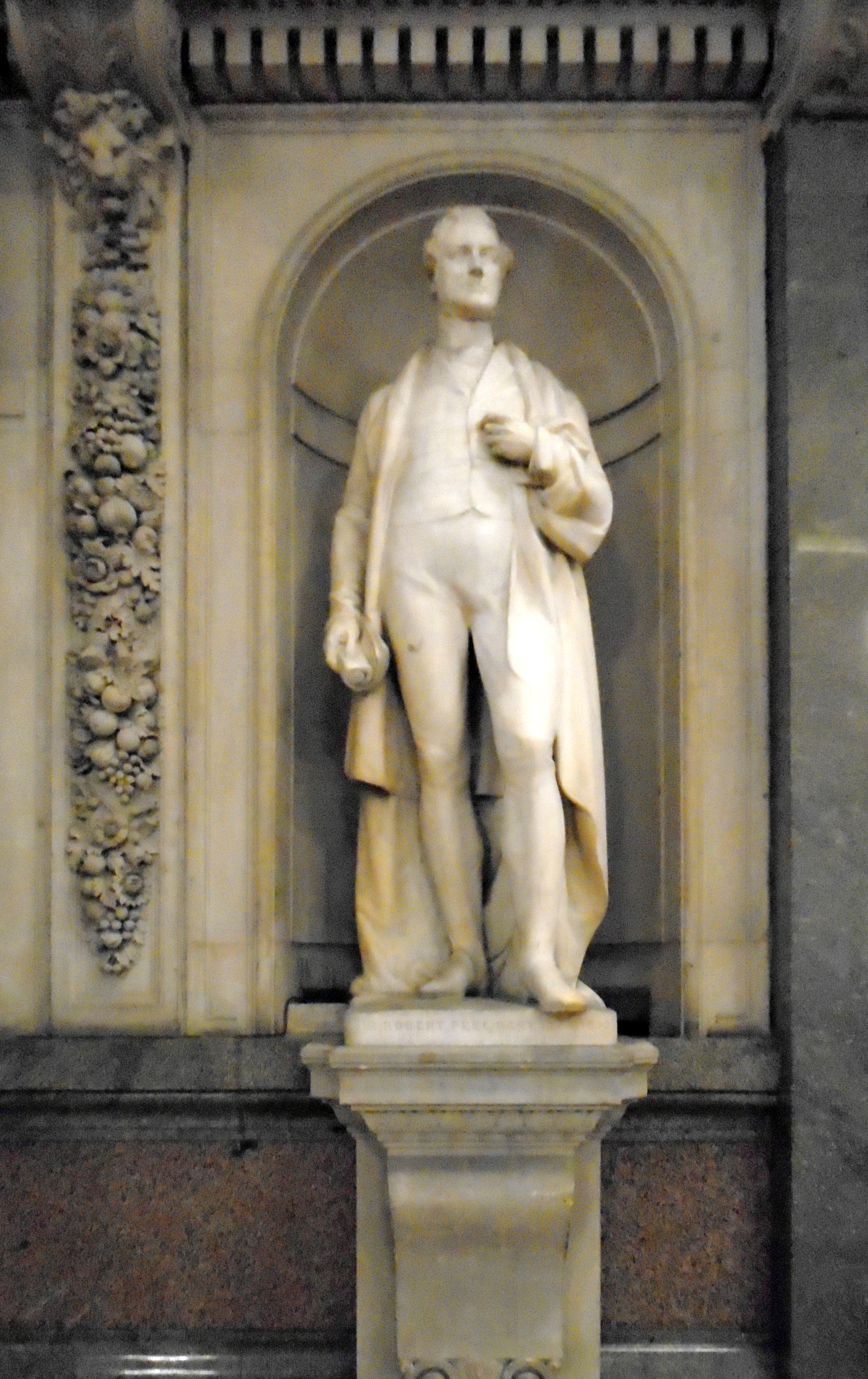
Sir Robert Peel, sculpted 1854 by Matthew Noble

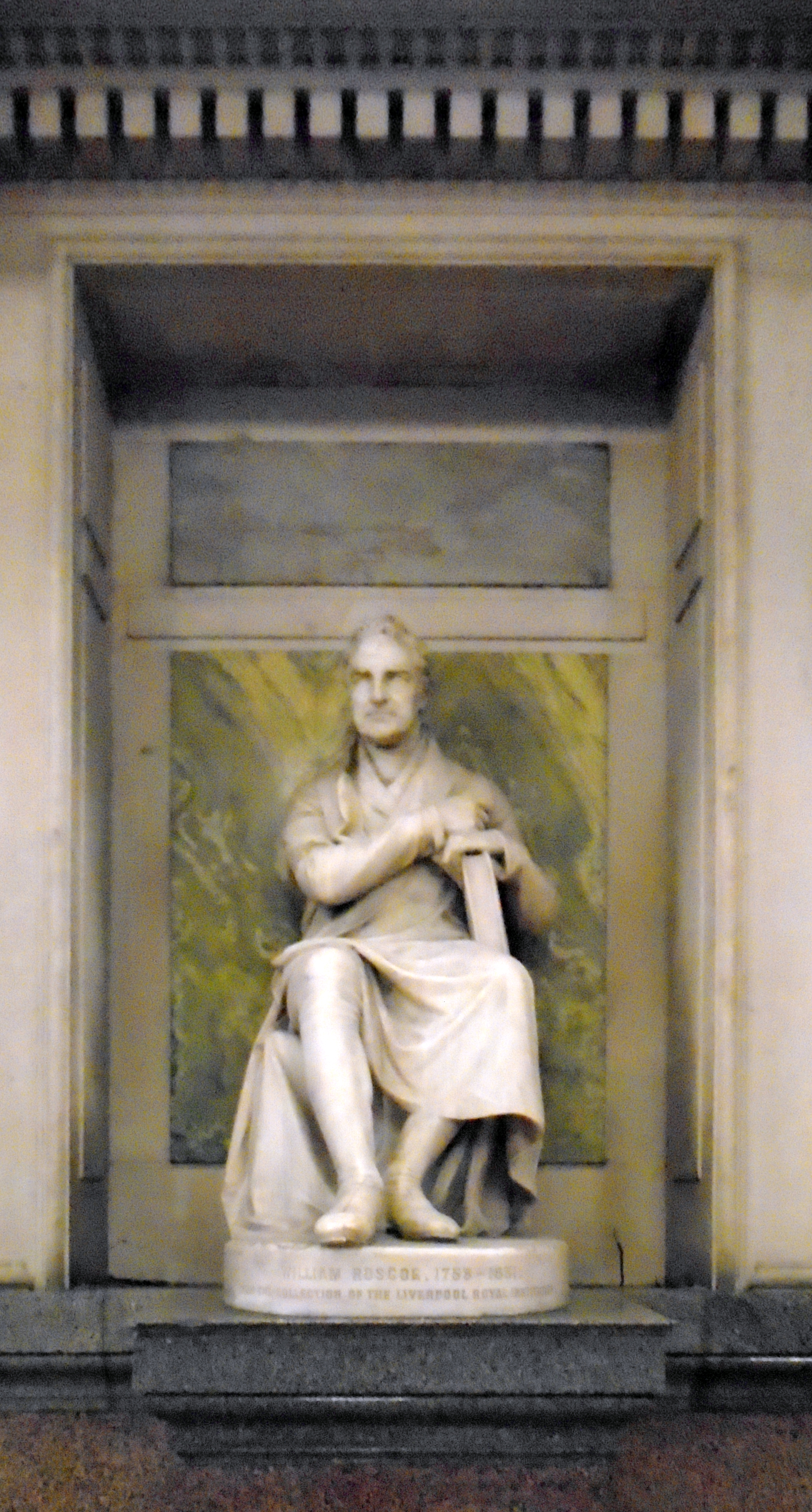
William Roscoe, moved to the Hall from The Royal Institution, sculpted 1841 by Francis Leggatt Chantrey

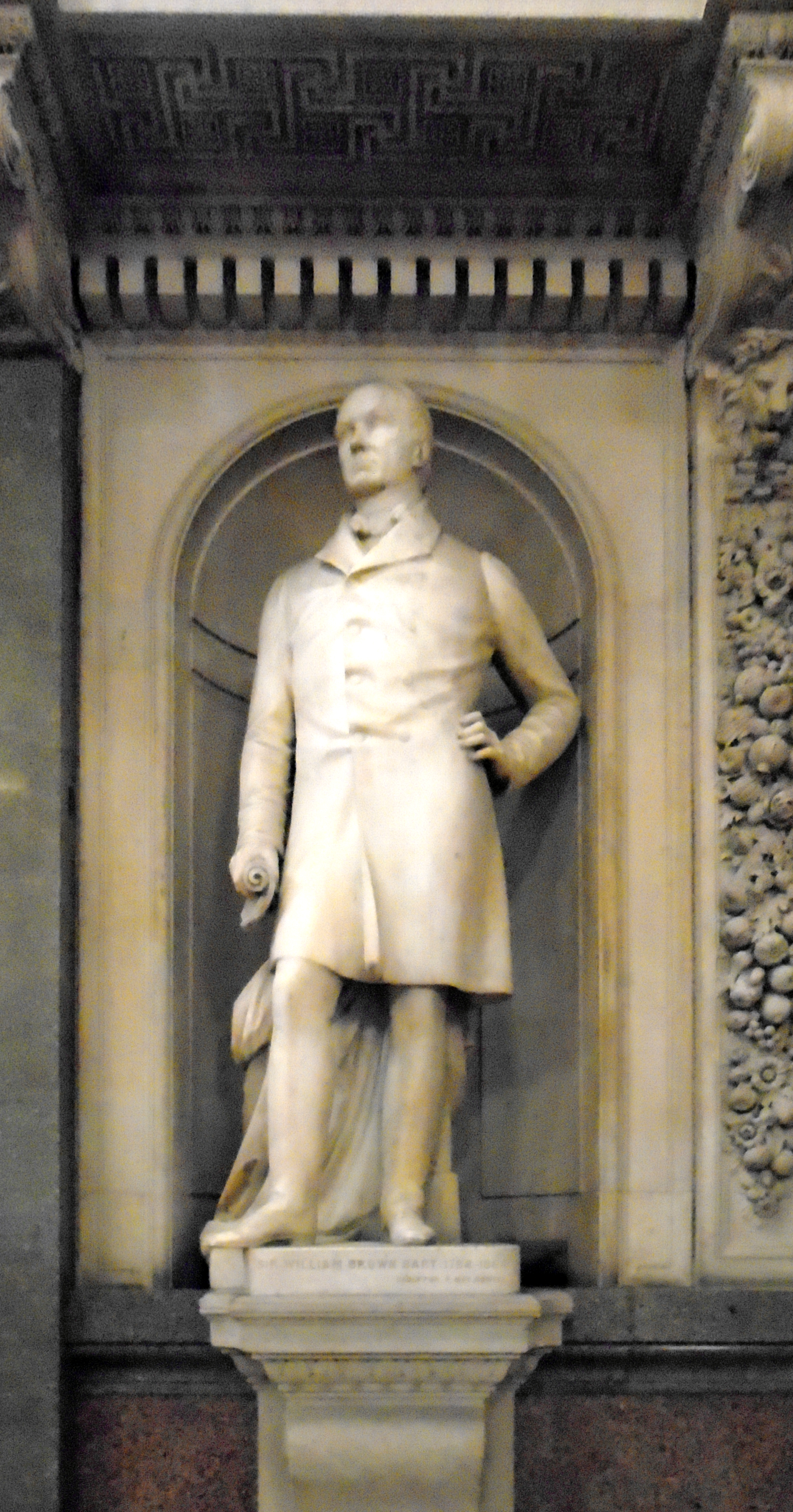
William Brown, sculpted 1860 by Patrick MacDowell

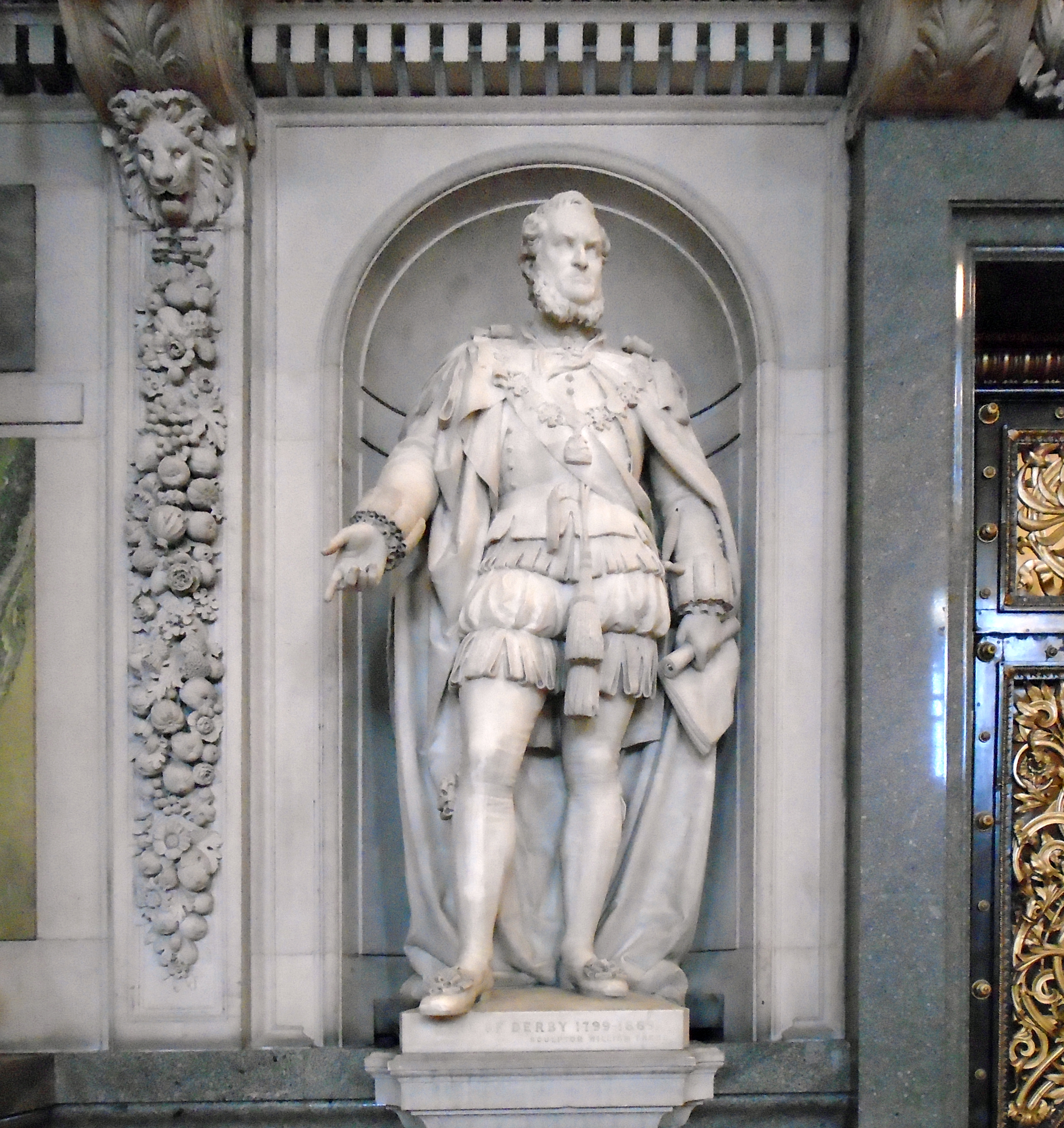
14th Earl of Derby, sculpted 1869 by William Theed

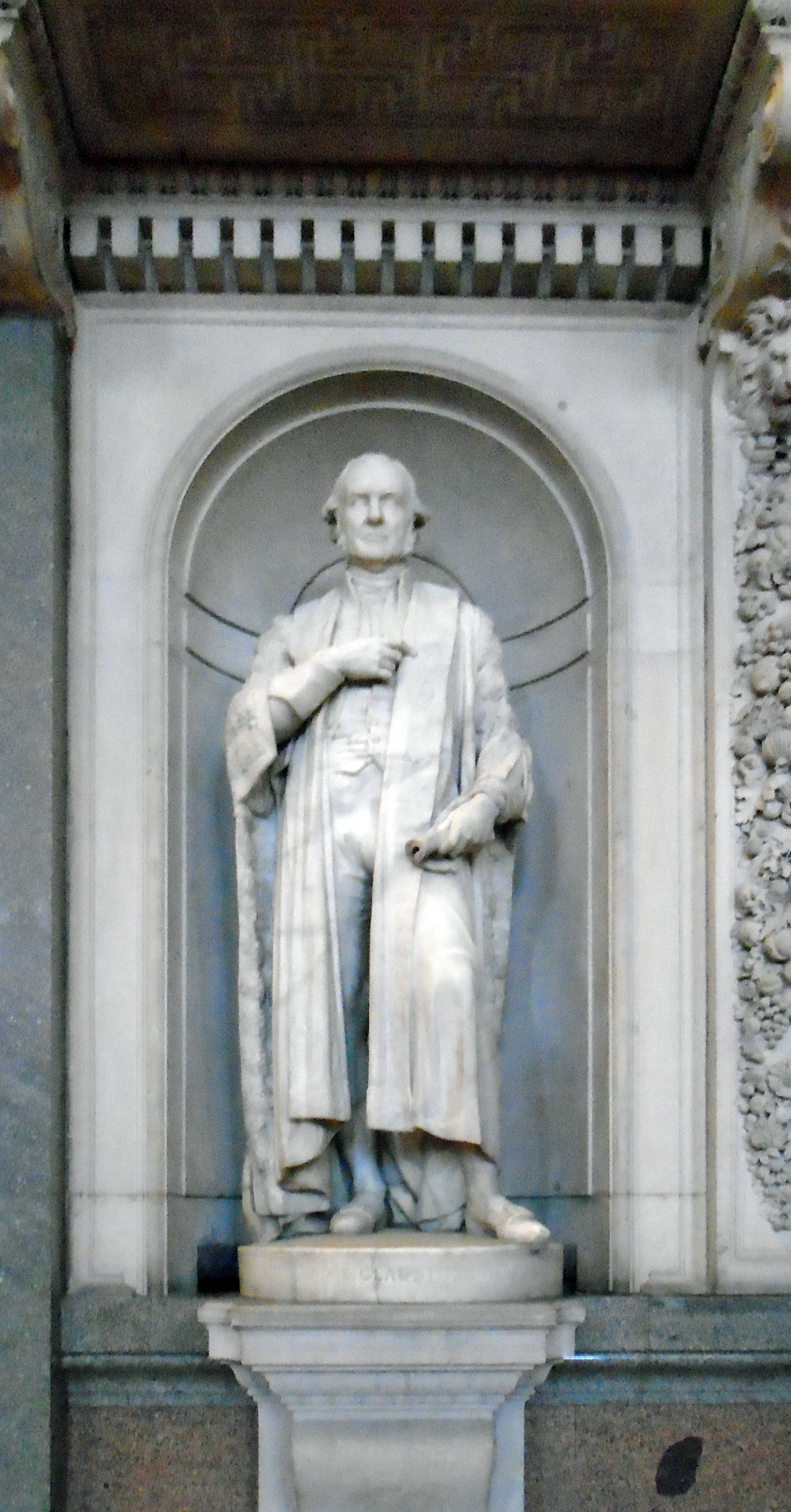
William Ewart Gladstone, sculpted 1869, by John Adams-Acton

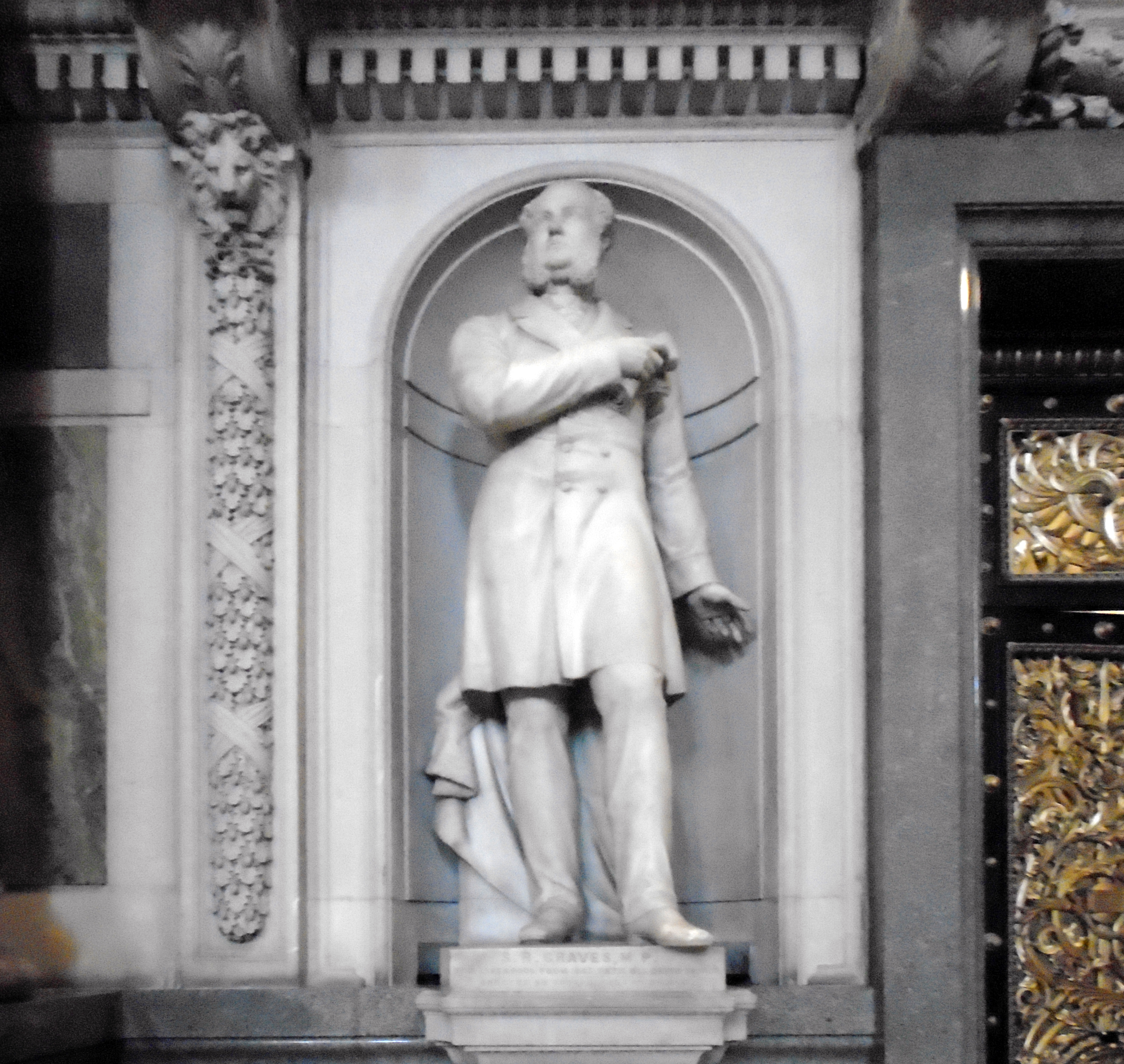
Samuel Robert Graves, sculpted 1875 by Giovanni Fontana

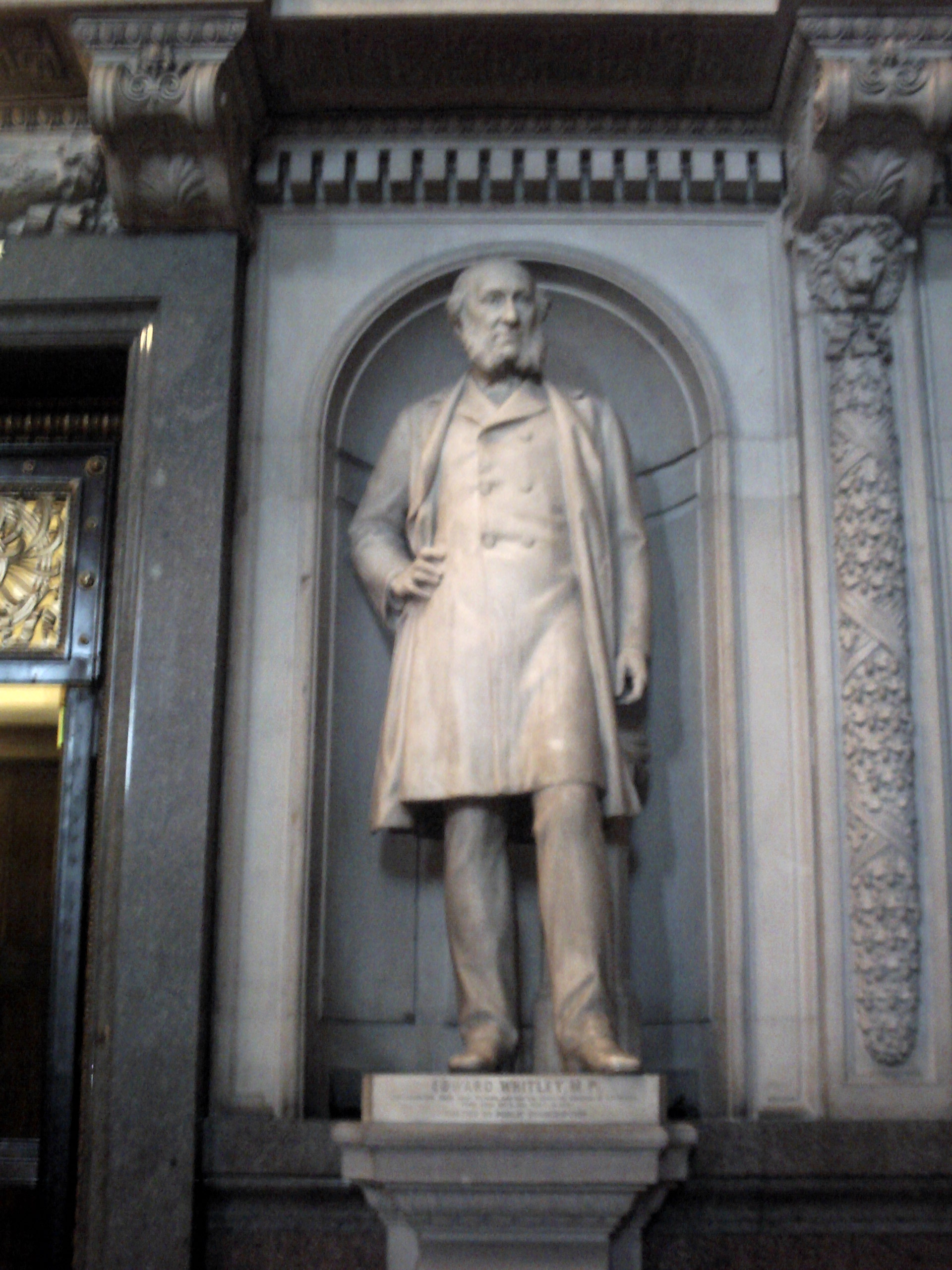
Edward Whitley, sculpted 1895 by Albert Bruce-Joy

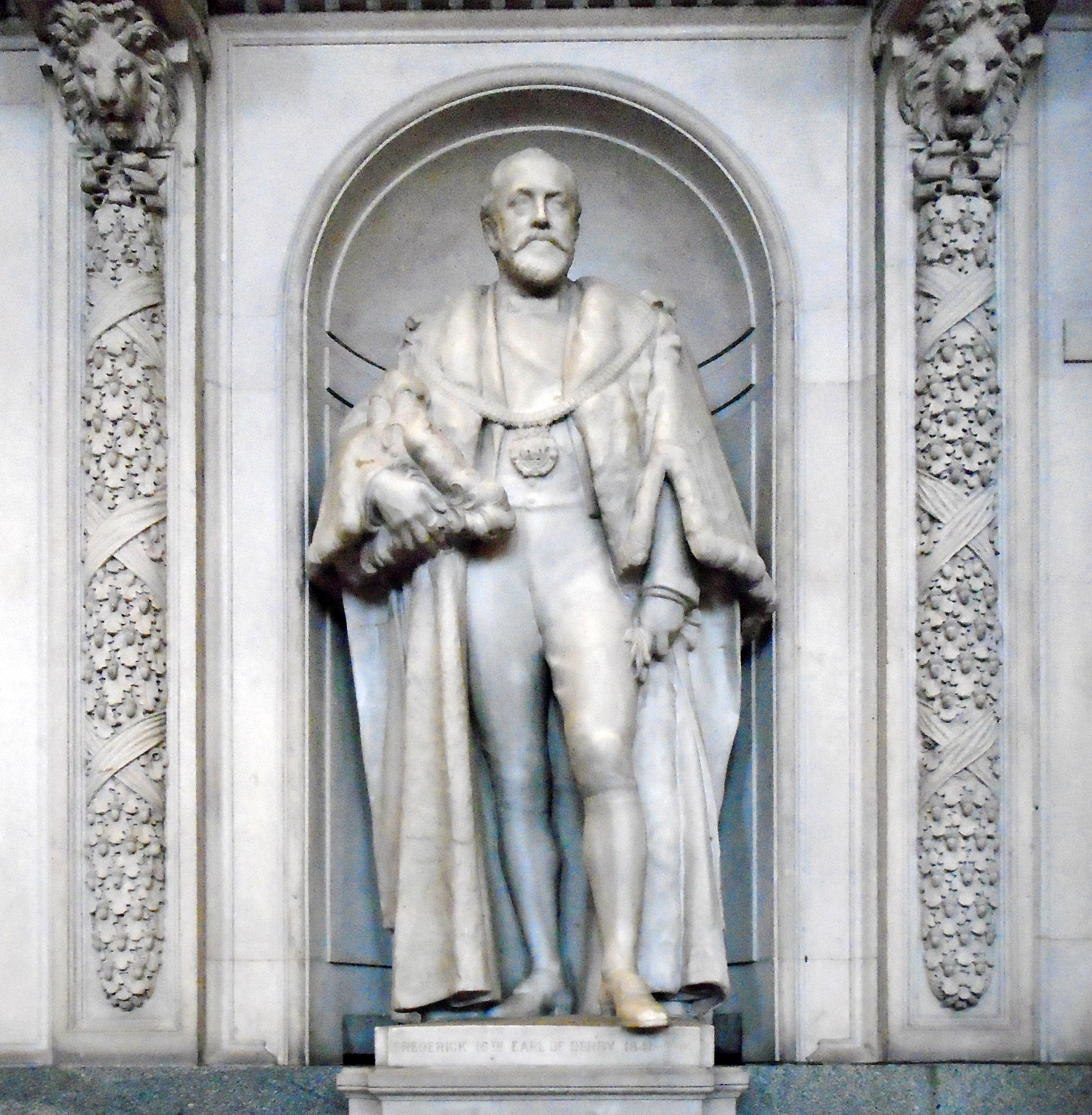
16th Earl of Derby sculpted 1911 by F. W. Pomeroy

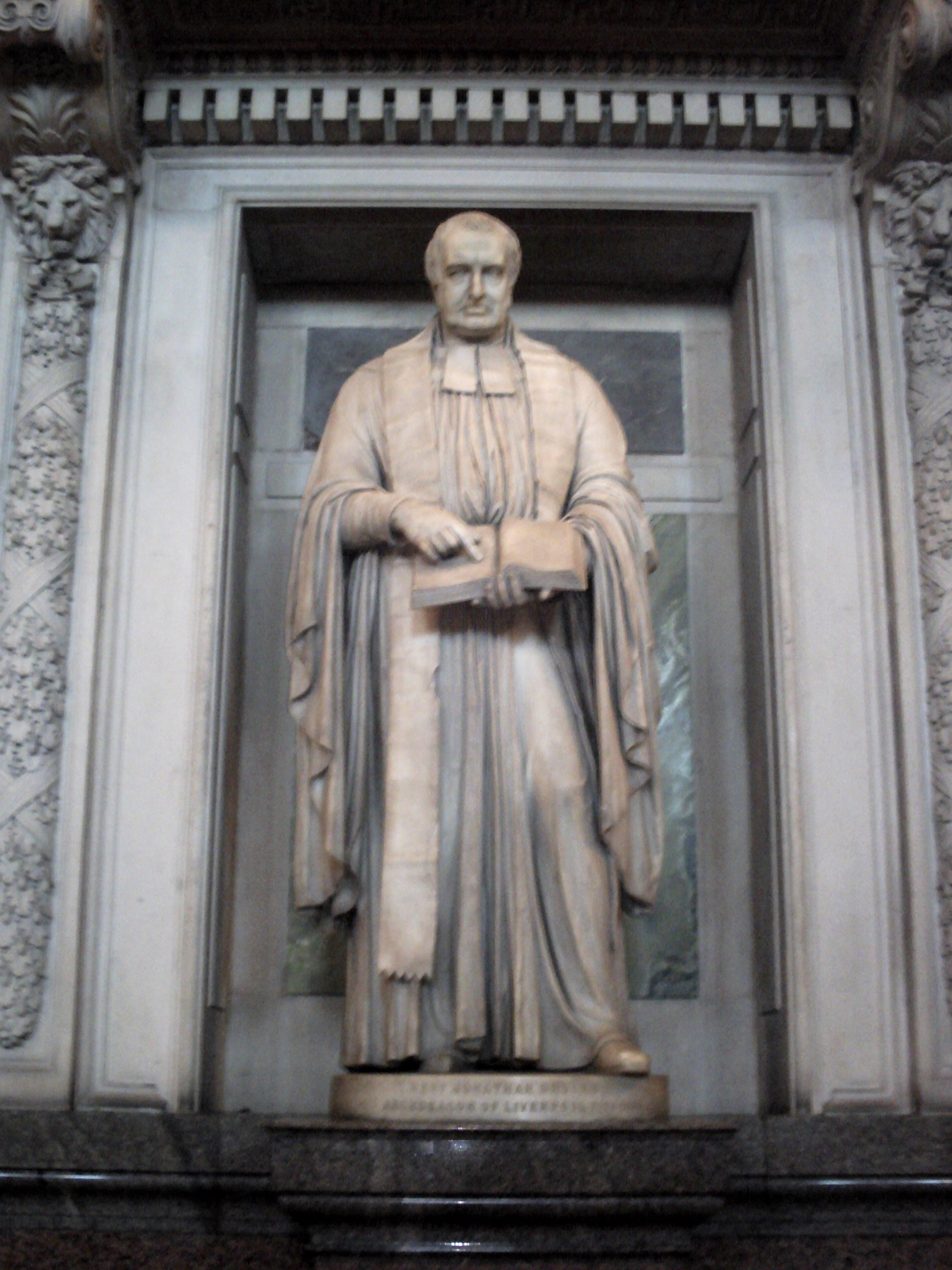
Rev. Jonathan Brooks sculpted 1858-59 by Benjamin Edward Spence

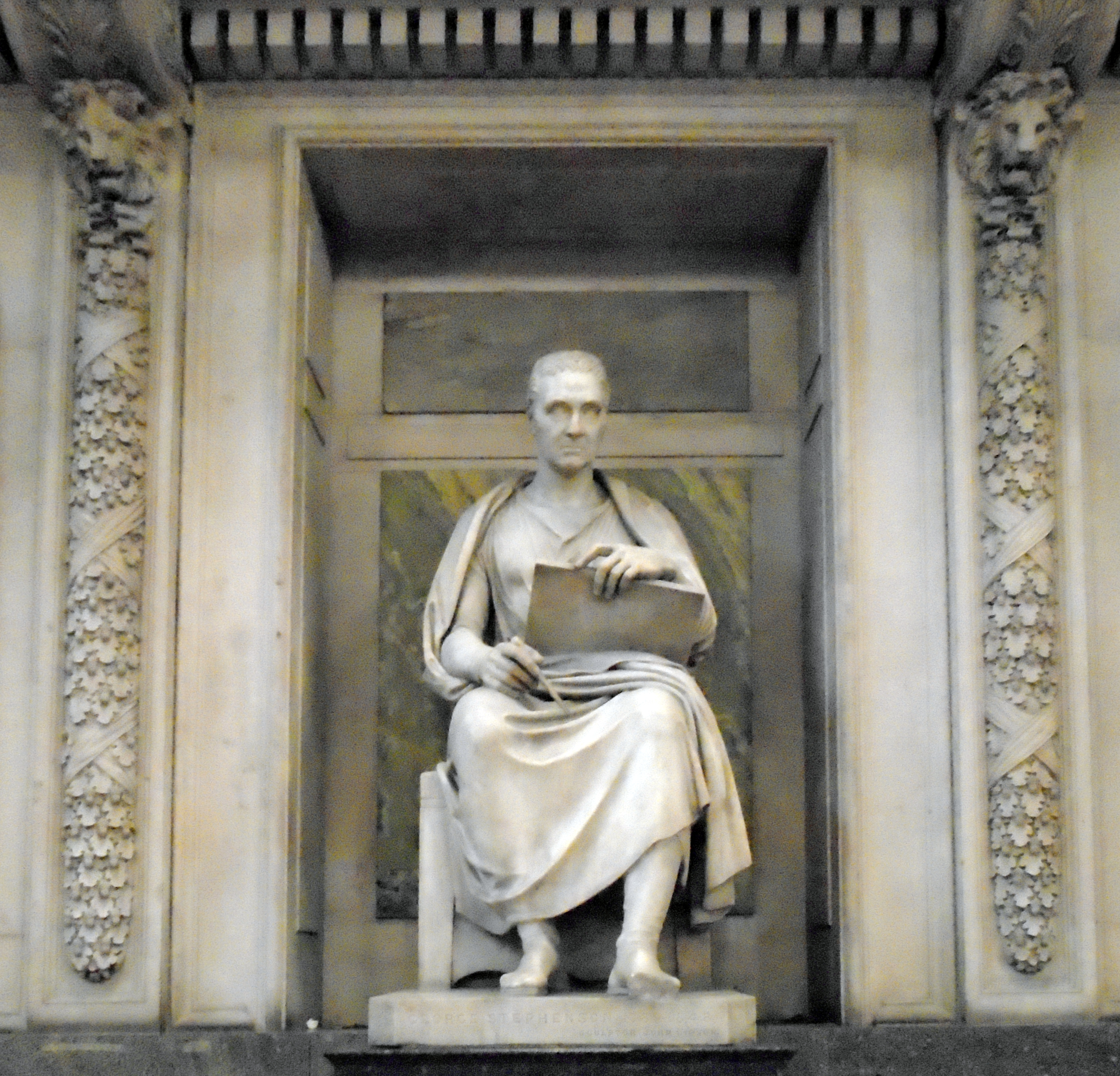
George Stephenson, sculpted 1854 by John Gibson

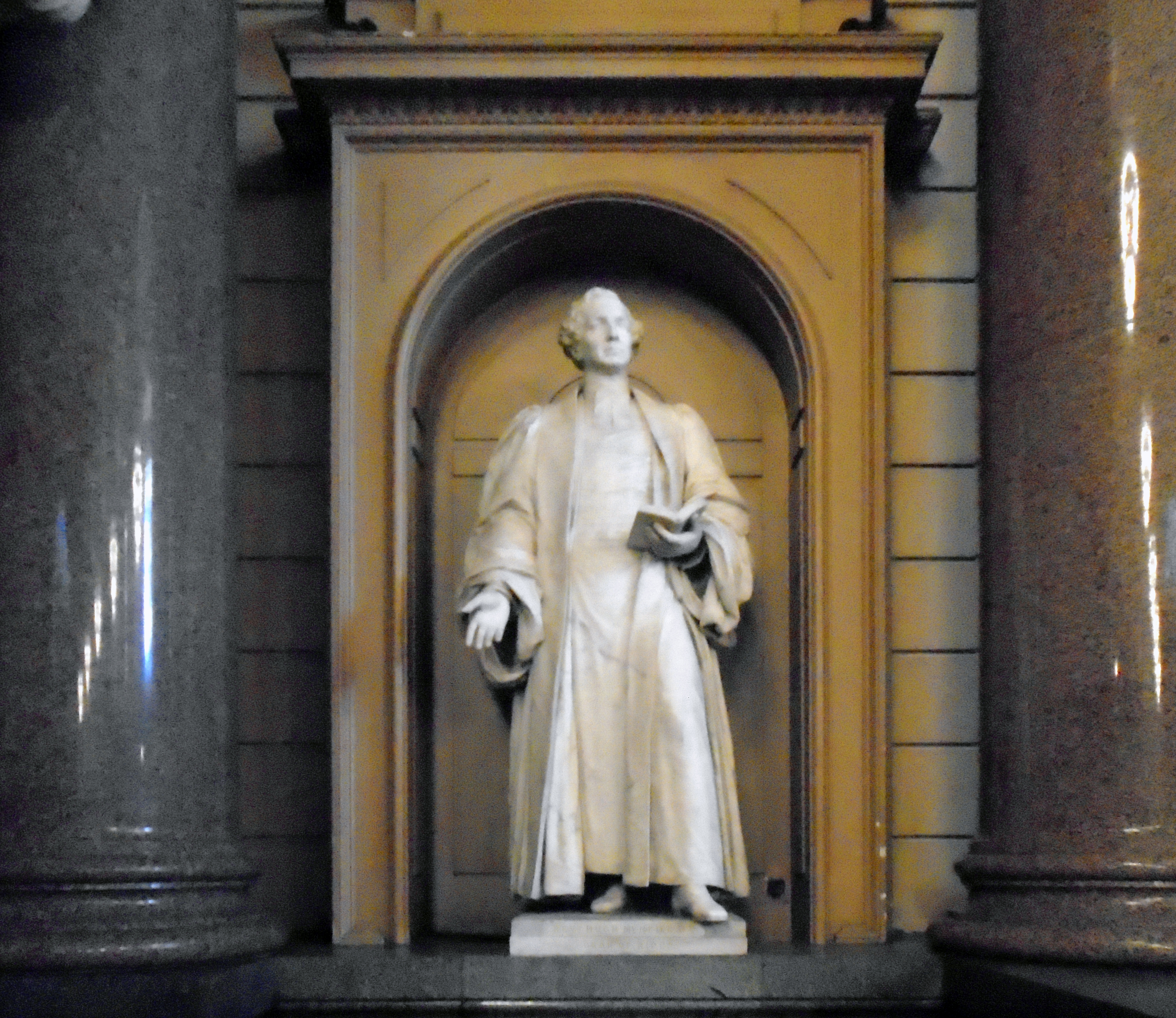
Hugh M‘Neile, sculpted 1871 by George Gammon Adams

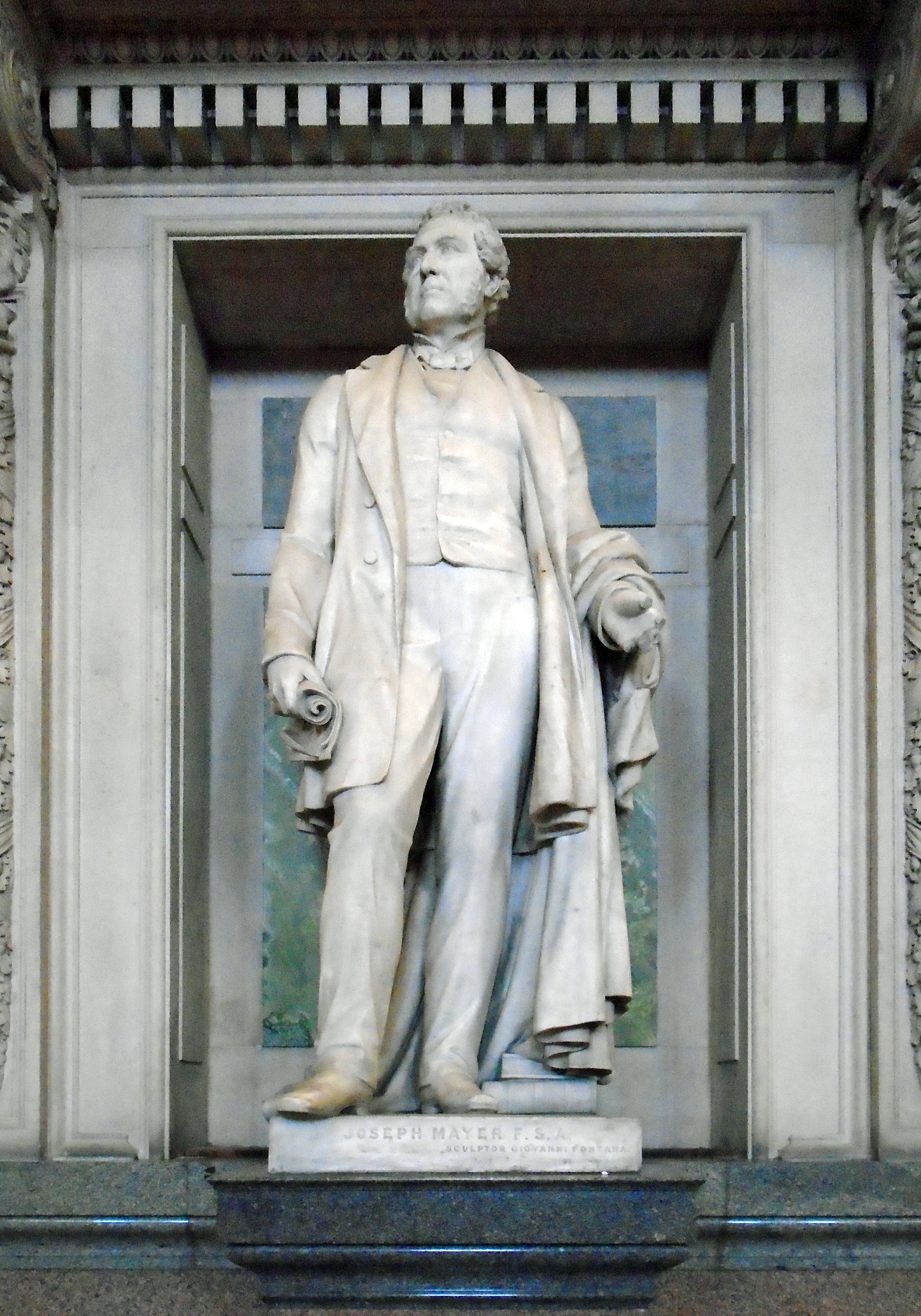
Joseph Mayer, sculpted 1869 by Giovanni Fontana

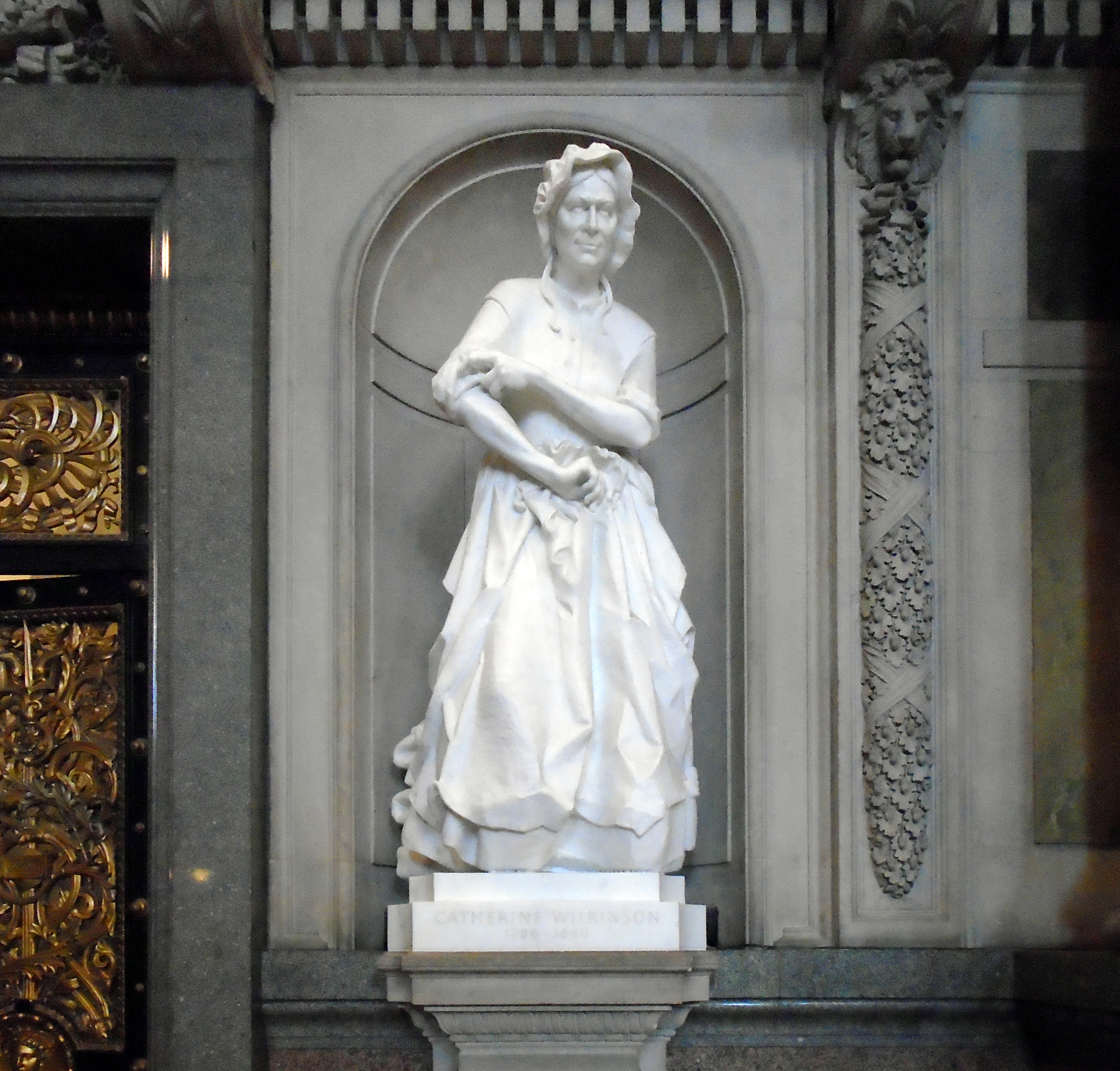
Kitty Wilkinson, sculpted 2012 by Simon Smith

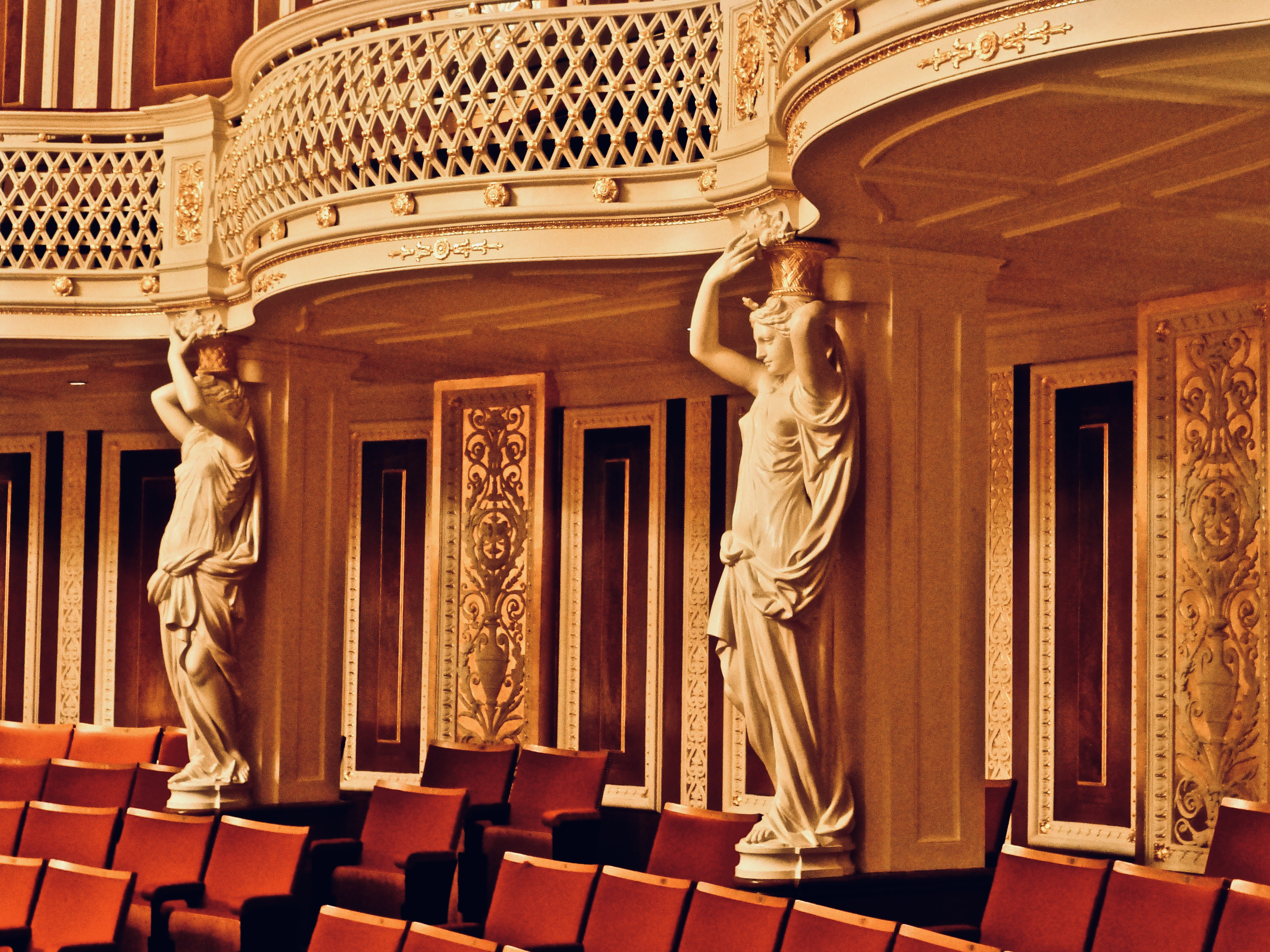
Inside the Small Concert Room

The Small Concert Room designed by Charles Robert Cockerell and completed in 1856, is elliptical measuring 72 feet (22 m) by 77 feet (23 m), when built it had a capacity for 1,100 people, the stage is 30 feet (9 m) by 12 feet (4 m), and is lavishly decorated. In the past it was known as the Golden Concert Room. A balcony supported by caryatids runs round the room. At the back of the platform are attached columns, decorated with arabesques, supporting a frieze with griffins and between the columns are mirrors. The concert room was refurbished between 2000 and 2007. This included making alterations to comply with the Disability Discrimination Act, restoring the historical painting scheme and restoring the chandelier, which consists of 2,824 crystal pieces. It has seating for an audience of 480.

=== Ventilation and heating of the building ===
In the basement is part of a unique heating and ventilation system devised by Dr Boswell Reid. This was the first attempt at providing air conditioning in a public building in the United Kingdom, its aim being to warm and ventilate the building without draughts. Air drawn in via two shafts at either end of the eastern portico was warmed by five hot water pipes, that were heated by two coke-fired boilers and two steam boilers, these latter two were only used in extremely cold weather. The air was circulated by four fans 10 feet (3 m) wide driven by a 10 horsepower steam engine. In hot weather the air was cooled using cold mains water, small fountains in the air shafts cooling the incoming air. The air from the system entered the Great Hall via grilles at the back of the sculpture niches and in the risers of the seating tiers in the Small Concert Hall, stale air was drawn out through grilles in the ceilings. The air flow was controlled by a large number of workers opening and closing a series of canvas flaps via ropes and pulleys, though the court rooms had valves beneath the benches that could be controlled by the occupants. The system treated different parts of the building as zones allowing separate heating. In 2005 the Heritage Group of the Chartered Institution of Building Services Engineers awarded its first Blue Plaque to St George's Hall recognising it as the World's First Air Conditioned Building.

Heating and ventilation system

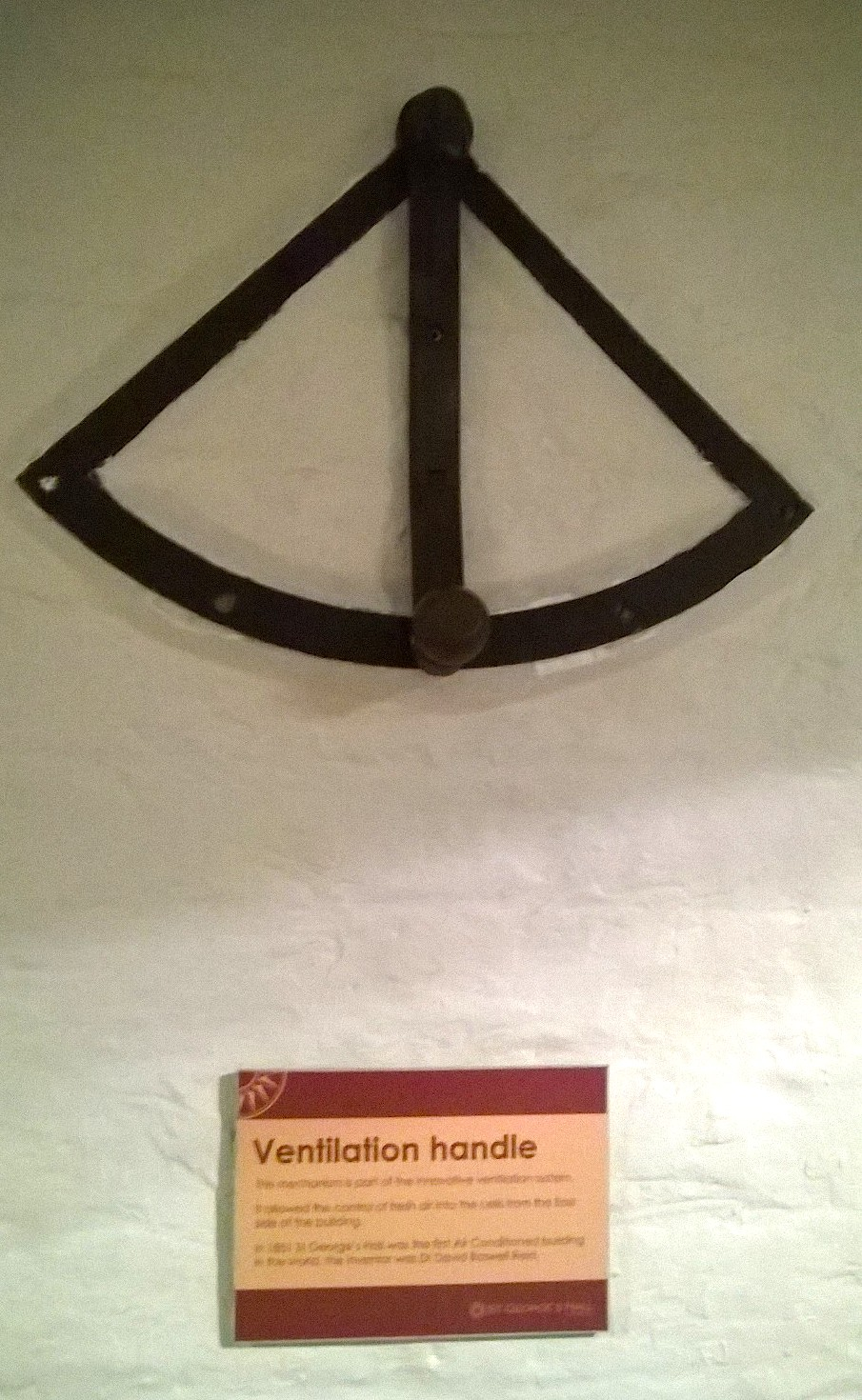
Ventilation Handle

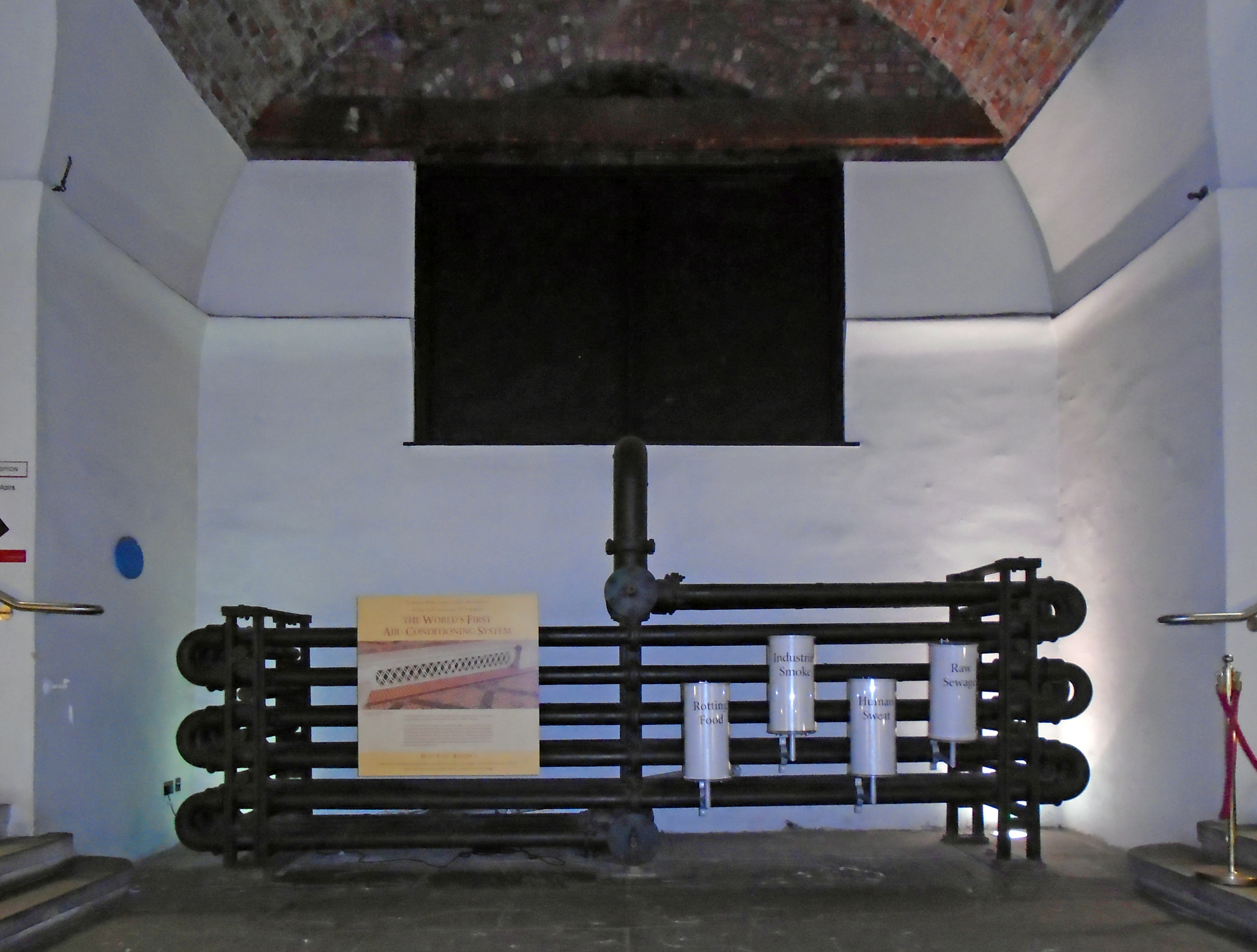
Part of the original central heating system

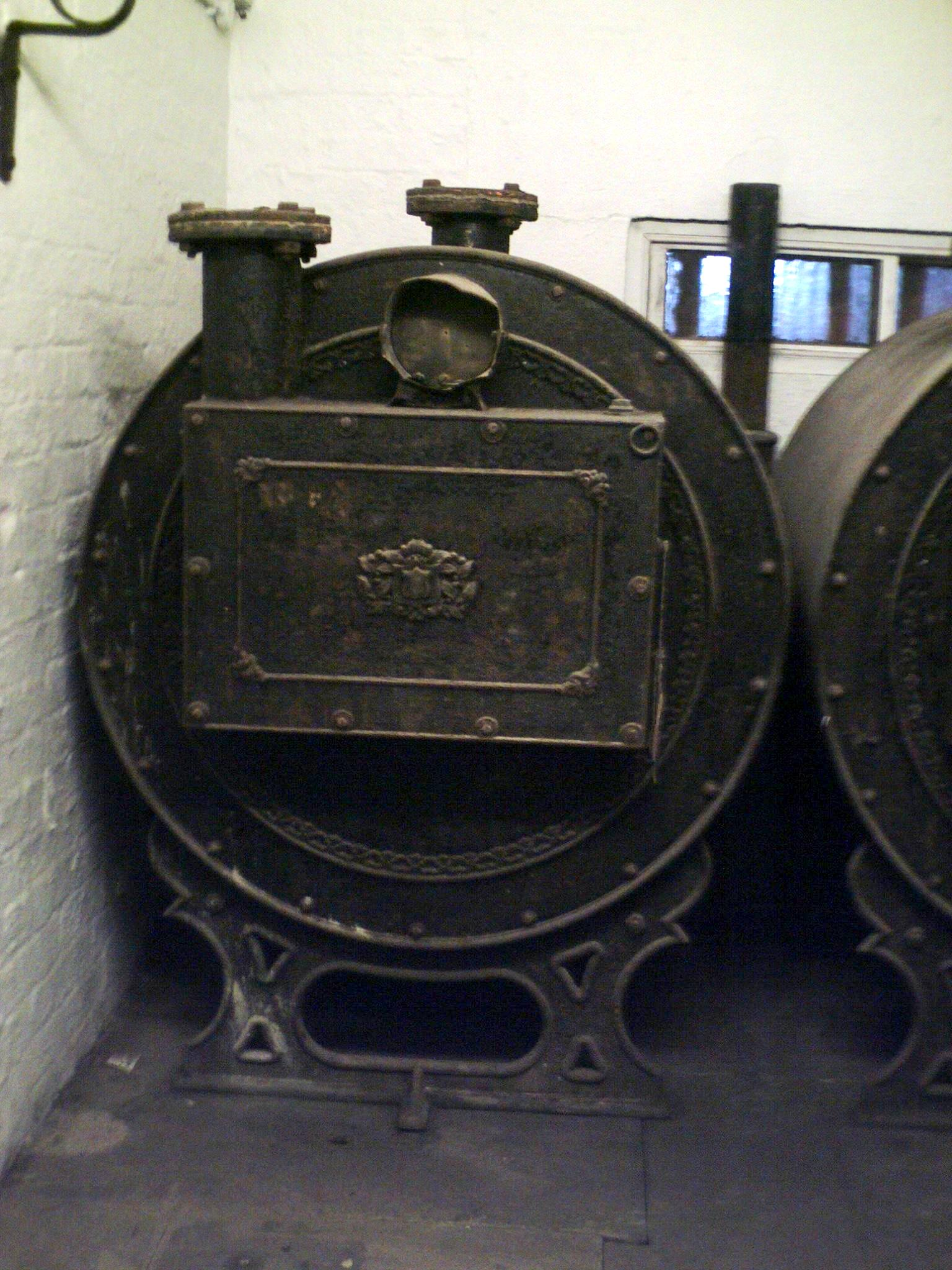
One of the Victorian boilers in the basement

=== Assizes ===
Until 1984 the Liverpool Assizes (later the Crown Court) were held in the courtroom at the southern end of St George's Hall. Notable cases heard include those of Florence Maybrick in 1889 and William Herbert Wallace in 1931. The court now often doubles for the Old Bailey in film and TV dramas.

The Crown Court

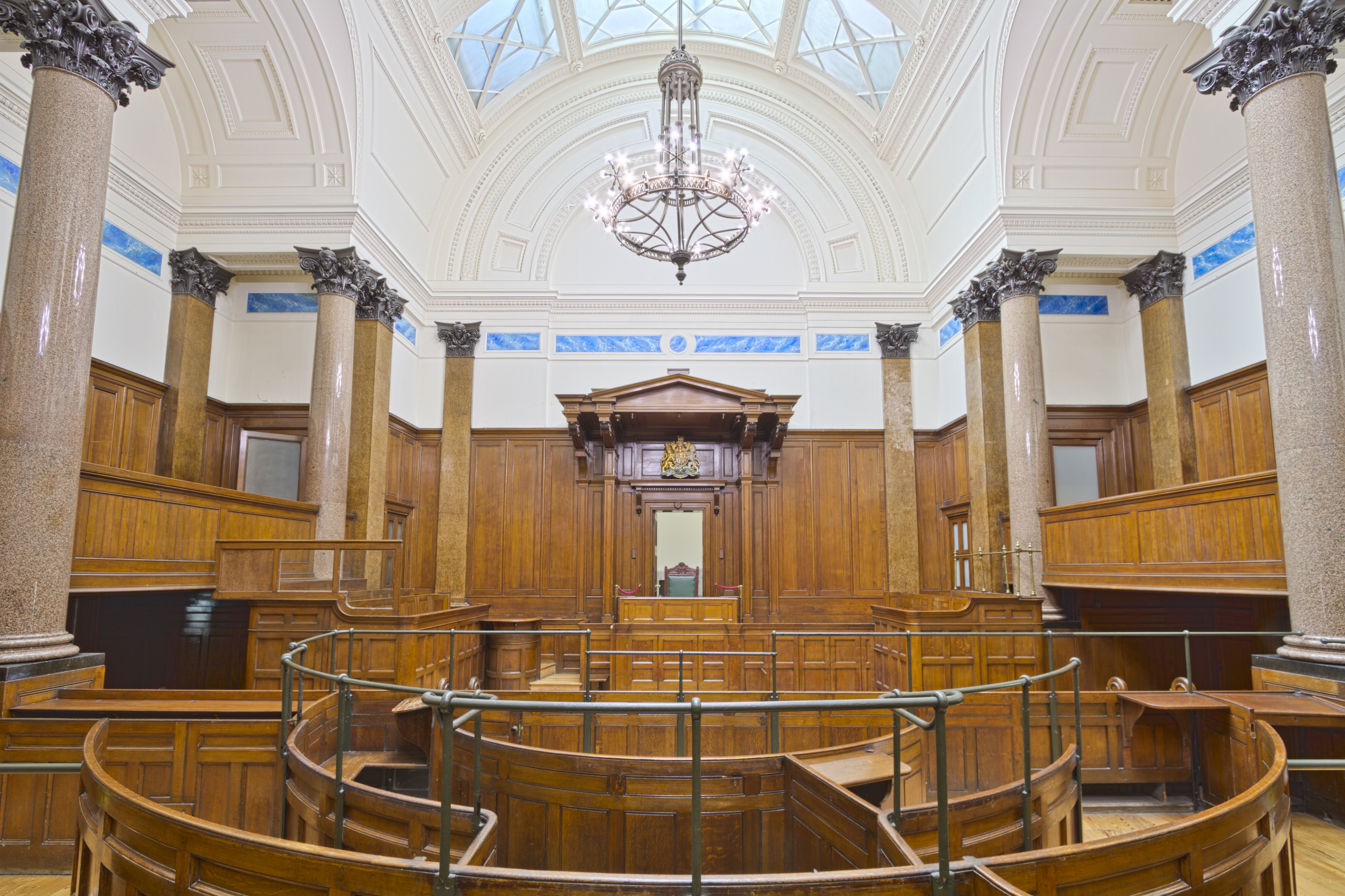
General view of Crown Court

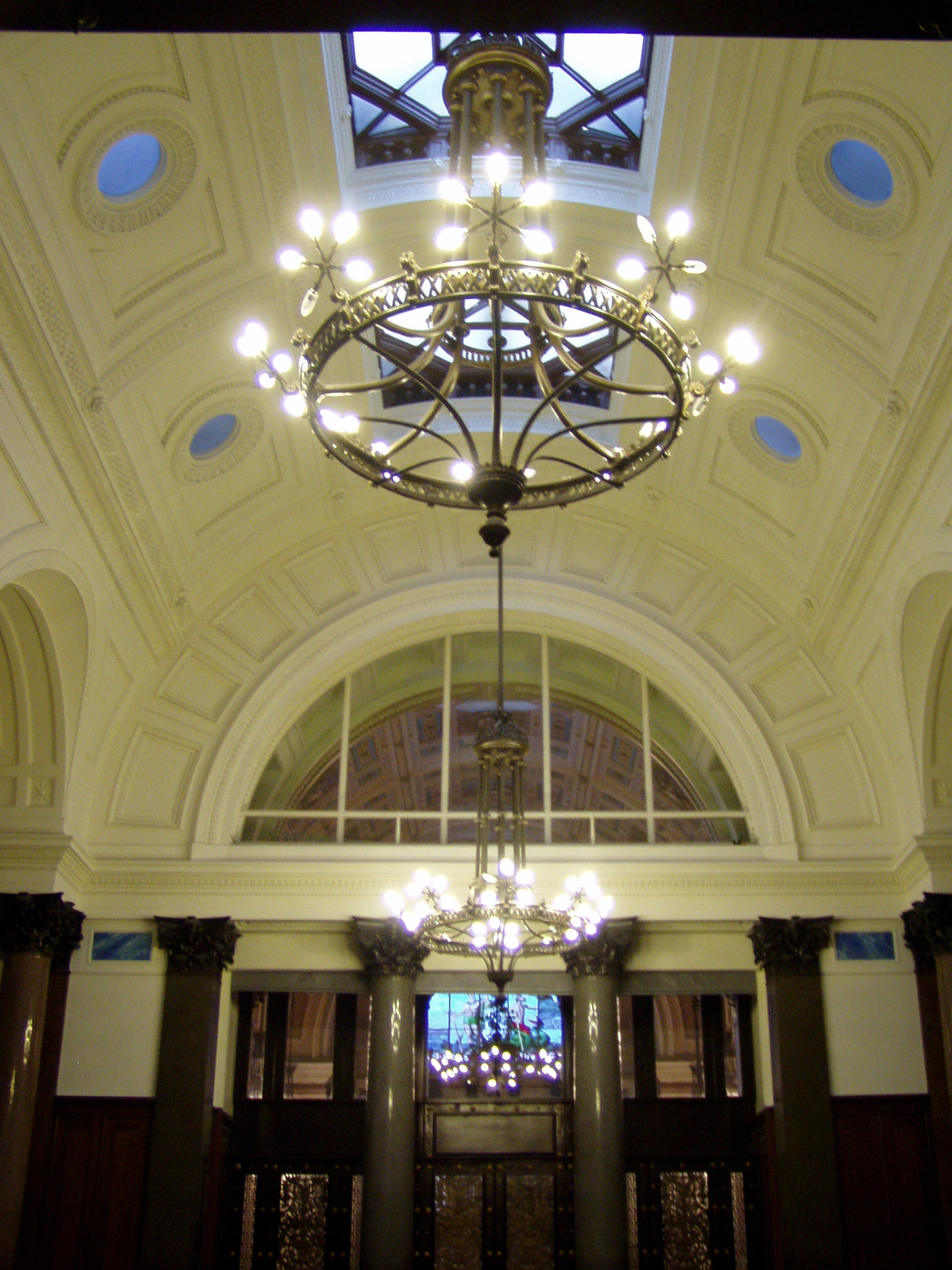
View of Crown Court from Judges point of view

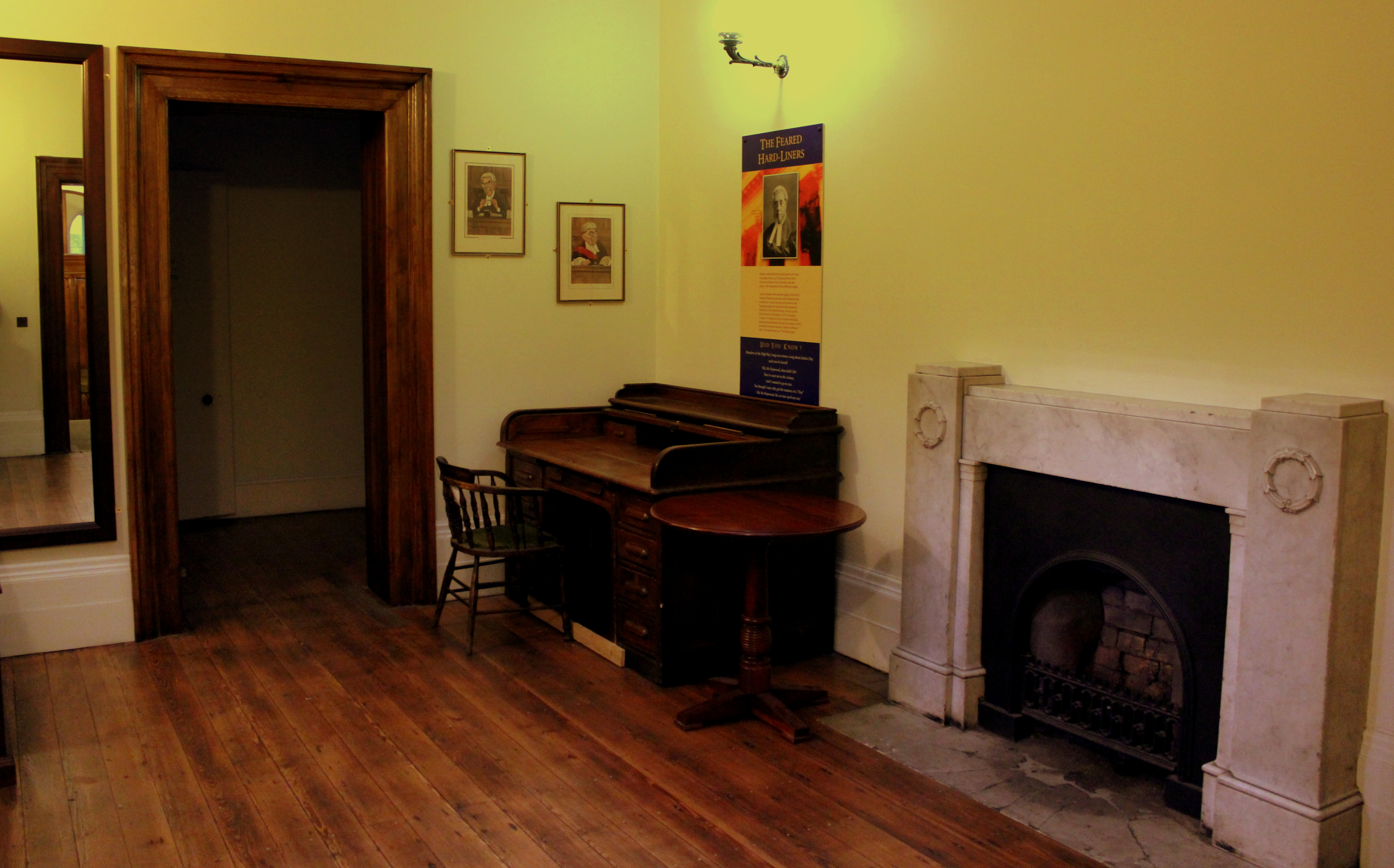
Judge's chamber for Crown Court, entered from the door behind the judge's seat in the Crown Court

== Events held at the building ==
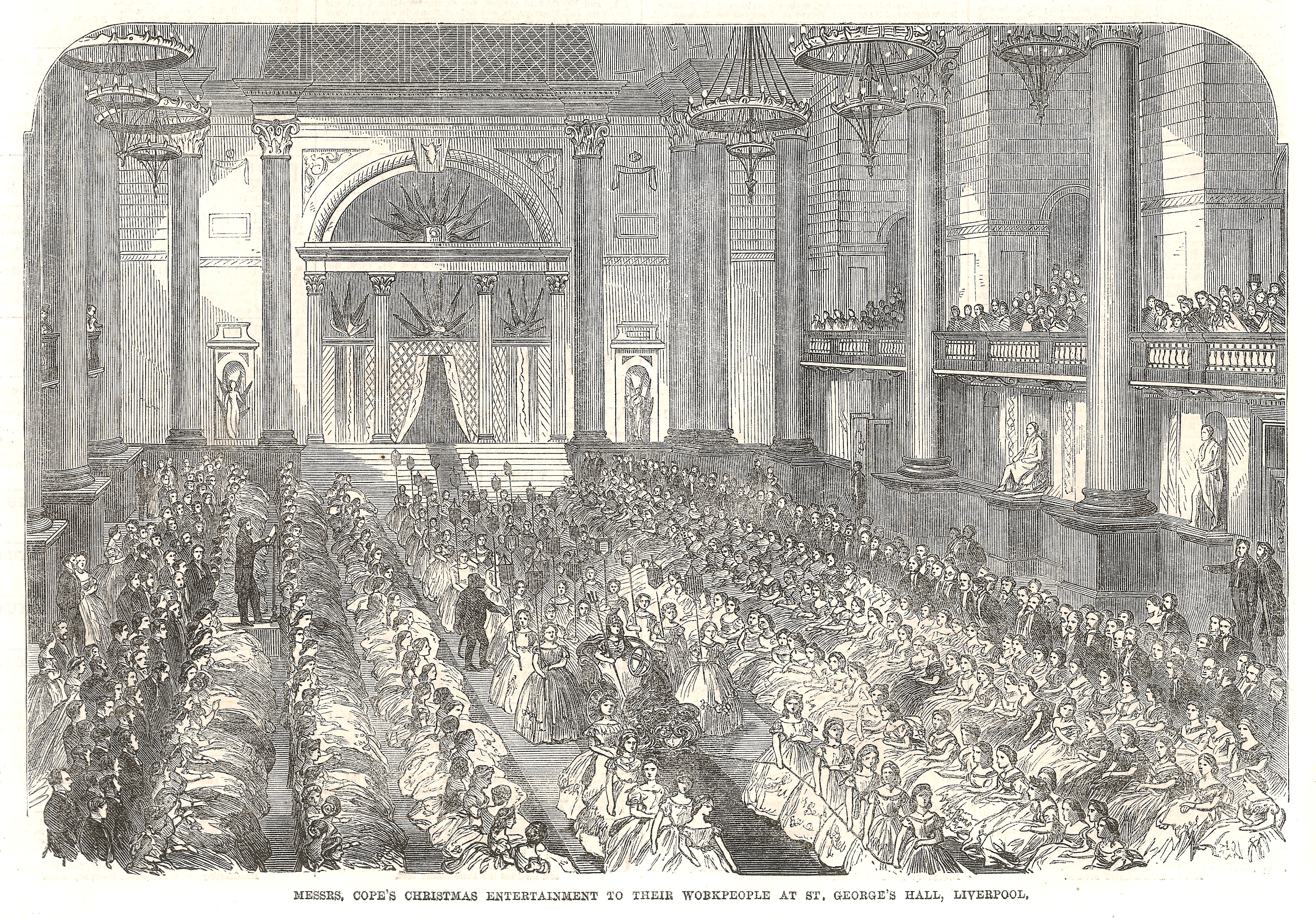
Christmas entertainment in Great Hall 1864

Queen Victoria and Prince Albert visited St George's Hall on 9 October 1851, although complete externally work was still underway internally. The inaugural event opened by the mayor and borough council and was started on 18 September 1854, and was a three-day festival of music, followed on 22 September, with the British Association for the Advancement of Science holding the first of many meetings at the Hall. On 15 April 1857 a banquet for 800 people was held in honour of William Brown benefactor of Liverpool's museum and library. On 23 April 1864 a Fancy Dress ball was held in aid of St Ann 's Dispensary. The Small Concert Room it was regularly host to Charles Dickens, who held many of his readings there. Prior to Dickens sailing to America a banquet was hosted in the Great Hall for him on 10 April 1869. A cross section of activities in the 1880s include 24 March 1886, evening concert in an aid of District Cotton Porters and Dock Labourers; 1 November 1886 Large Hall, benevolent fund Liverpool Operative Platerworkers' Association; 5 April 1887 'Special' Grand Jury Room. To exhibit the new and improved method of applying gas to high class cookery; 22 December 1888, Large Hall, People's concert, Messiah.

During the 1911 Liverpool general transport strike, many meetings were held there, including the rally which sparked the 'Bloody Sunday' attacks, when police baton charged thousands of people who had gathered to hear the syndicalist Tom Mann speak. On 15 March 1915 Lord Kitchener inspect 12,000 soldiers of the Liverpool Pals on St George's Plateau, by September 1914, more than 30,000 men had enlisted at St George's Hall. The Plateau has been associated with public rallies and gatherings, including events following the deaths of the Beatles members John Lennon and George Harrison, and the homecomings of Liverpool and Everton football teams after Cup Final victories.

The opening of the European Capital of Culture celebrations in 2008 saw Ringo Starr play on the roof of the building to over 50,000 people. The Weeping Window sculpture was displayed at St George's Hall from 7 November 2015 to 17 January 2016, it was made from ceramic poppies from Blood Swept Lands and Seas of Red. The commemoration of the 30th anniversary of the Hillsborough disaster saw from 13 April 2019 nine banners hung from the front of St George's Hall, featuring the images of the 96 who lost their lives, along with the powerful words ‘Never Forgotten’ on the Monday morning 15 April 96 lanterns were lit on the steps of the Hall, and members of the public paid their respects and left tributes.

The hall hosted the semi-final allocation draw for the Eurovision Song Contest 2023 on 31 January 2023.

== Organ and organists ==
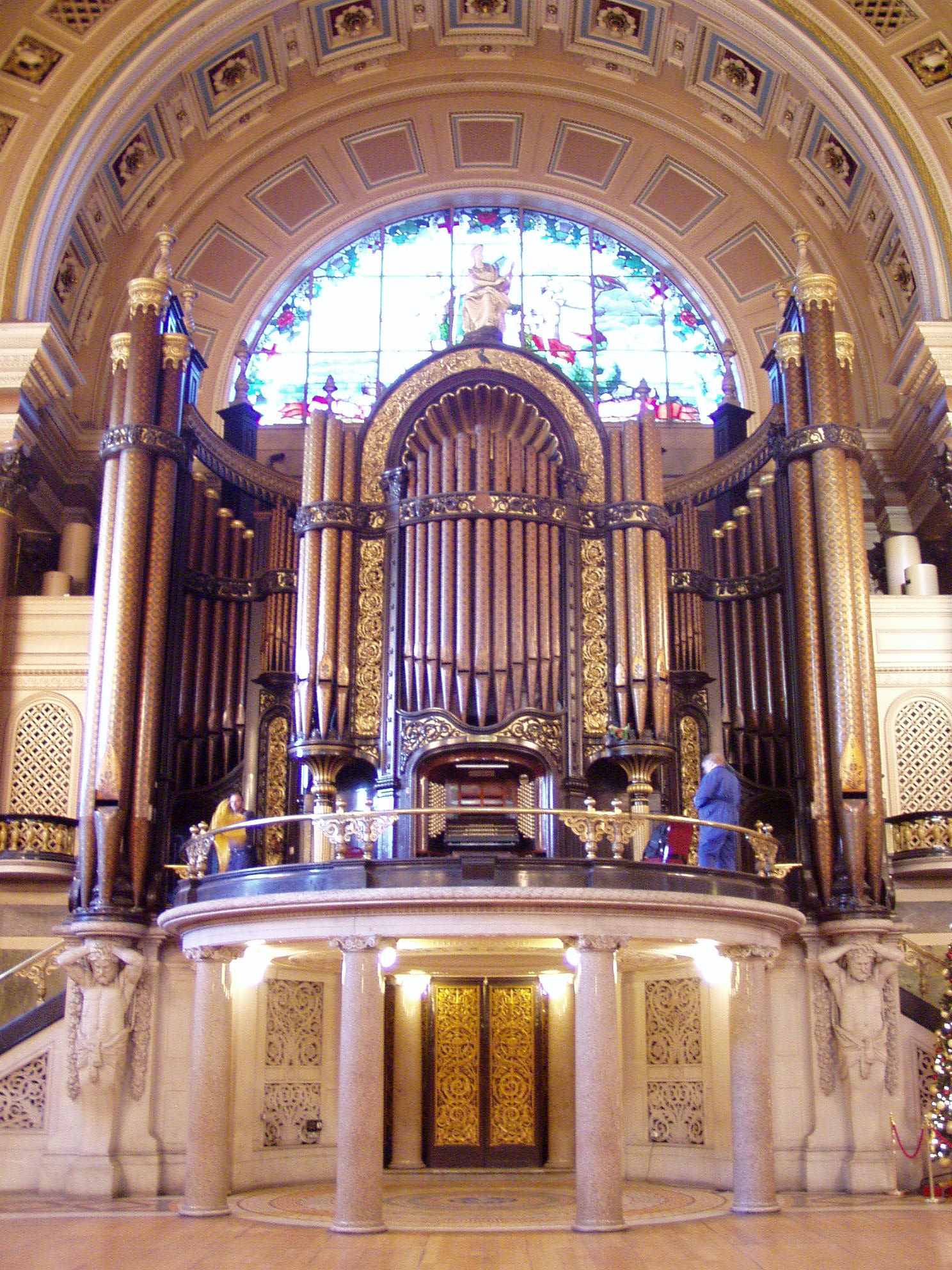
Organ, designed by Henry Willis, built 1851–55, enlarged 1931, the small statue on the top of the organ is music with her lyre. The platform supporting the organ, was designed by Cockerell. The Atlas figures flanking the platform, were sculpted by Edward Bowring Stephens

The organ was built by Henry Willis and completed in 1855 with 100 speaking stops across four manual divisions (of non-standard compass, 63 notes GG to a) and pedals (30 notes). It comprised a total of 119 ranks of pipes, plus 10 couplers, 10 composition pedals, and 36 pistons to set combinations of stops. It was initially tuned to meantone temperament to the specification of S. S. Wesley but in 1867 W. T. Best, city organist, had it retuned to equal temperament. The organ was rebuilt in 1896 when the key action was changed from the Willis-Barker lever assisted tracker (i.e. pneumatic assisted mechanical) action to pneumatic action. Also the manual compass was changed to the now standard CC to c, 61 notes, making the bottom 5 pipes on every manual stop redundant.

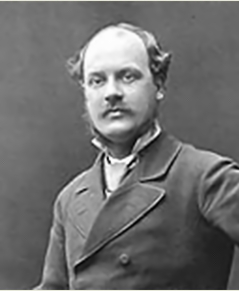
Albert Lister Peace

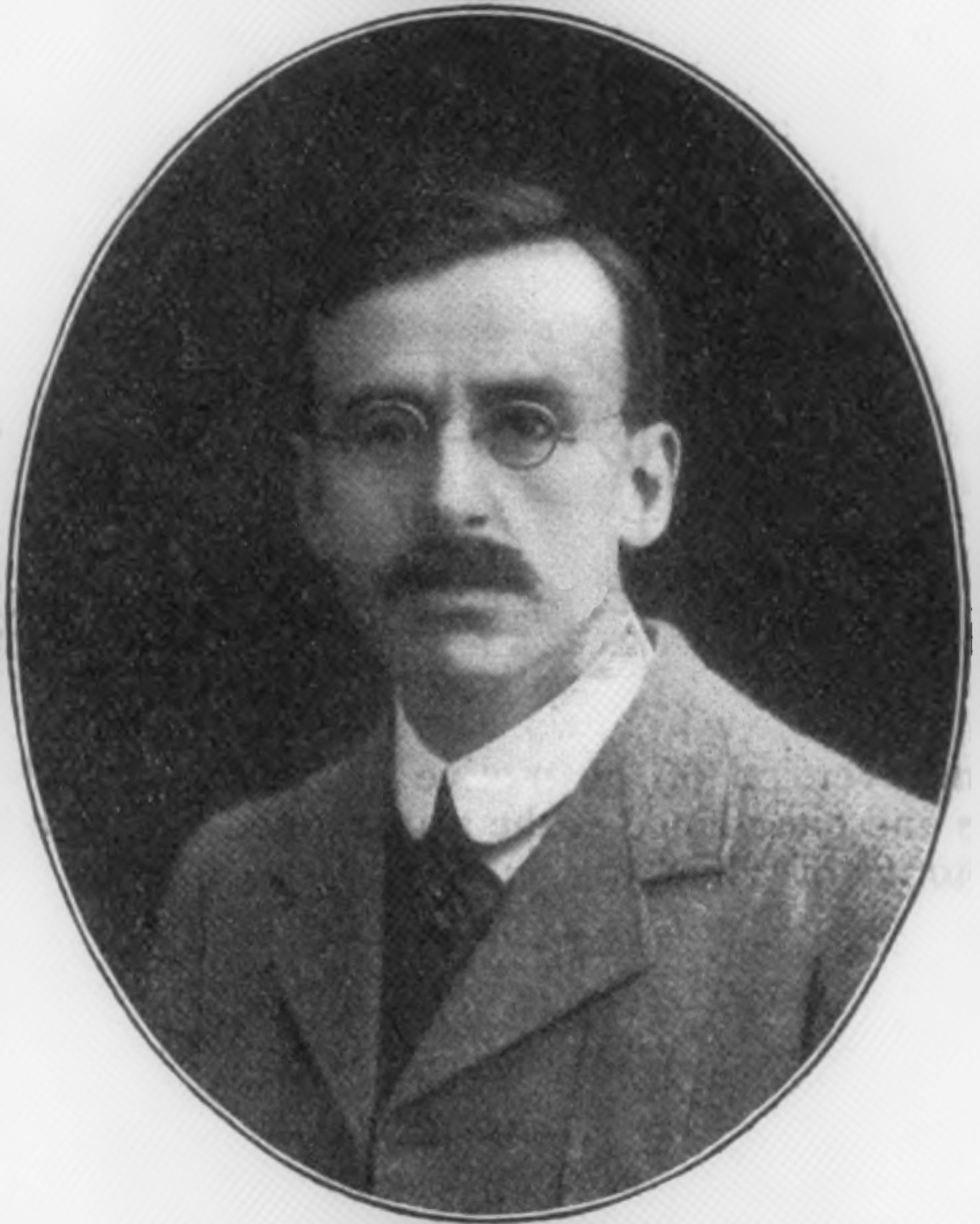
Herbert F. Ellingford 1913

In 1931 the organ was reconstructed by Henry Willis III when the number of stops was increased to 120 and electro-pneumatic action introduced for the combination systems and some of the key action. Its power source was still the Rockingham electric blowing plant which had replaced the two steam engines (one of 1855 and a second which had been added in about 1877 to run the increased pressure required since 1867 for some reed stops. In the interim this higher pressure had been hand blown!) The 1924 electric blowers remained in use until 2000 when the present new low and high pressure blowers were fitted by David Wells.

In 1979 it was given a general clean and overhaul by Henry Willis IV. The total number of registers, including 24 couplers, is 144. With 7,737 pipes, it was the largest organ in the country until a larger one was built at the Royal Albert Hall in 1871, after which an organ even larger than the one at the Royal Albert Hall was constructed at Liverpool Anglican Cathedral, using over 10,000 pipes. Repairs were made to the organ as part of the restoration of the hall in 2000–2007, including replacement of the bellows leather. The organ is maintained by David Wells, Organ Builders.

The first organist was W. T. Best (1826–97) who was appointed in 1855 and served until 1894. He was succeeded in 1896 by Dr Albert Lister Peace (1844–1912) who continued in the post until the year of his death. In 1913 Herbert Frederick Ellingford (1876–1966) was appointed organist. On 21 December 1940 the hall and its organ were damaged in an air-raid. It was not possible to obtain sufficient money to rebuild the organ until the 1950s. In 1954 Henry Willis & Sons were asked to undertake this project and Dr Caleb E. Jarvis (1903–1980) was its consultant. Dr Jarvis was appointed organist in 1957 and on his death in 1980 he was succeeded by Noel Rawsthorne (1929–2019), who had just retired as organist to the Anglican Cathedral. Noel Rawsthorne served as organist to the hall for four years. Following his retirement in 1984, Professor Ian Tracey, who is also Organist Titulaire of the Anglican Cathedral, was appointed to the post.

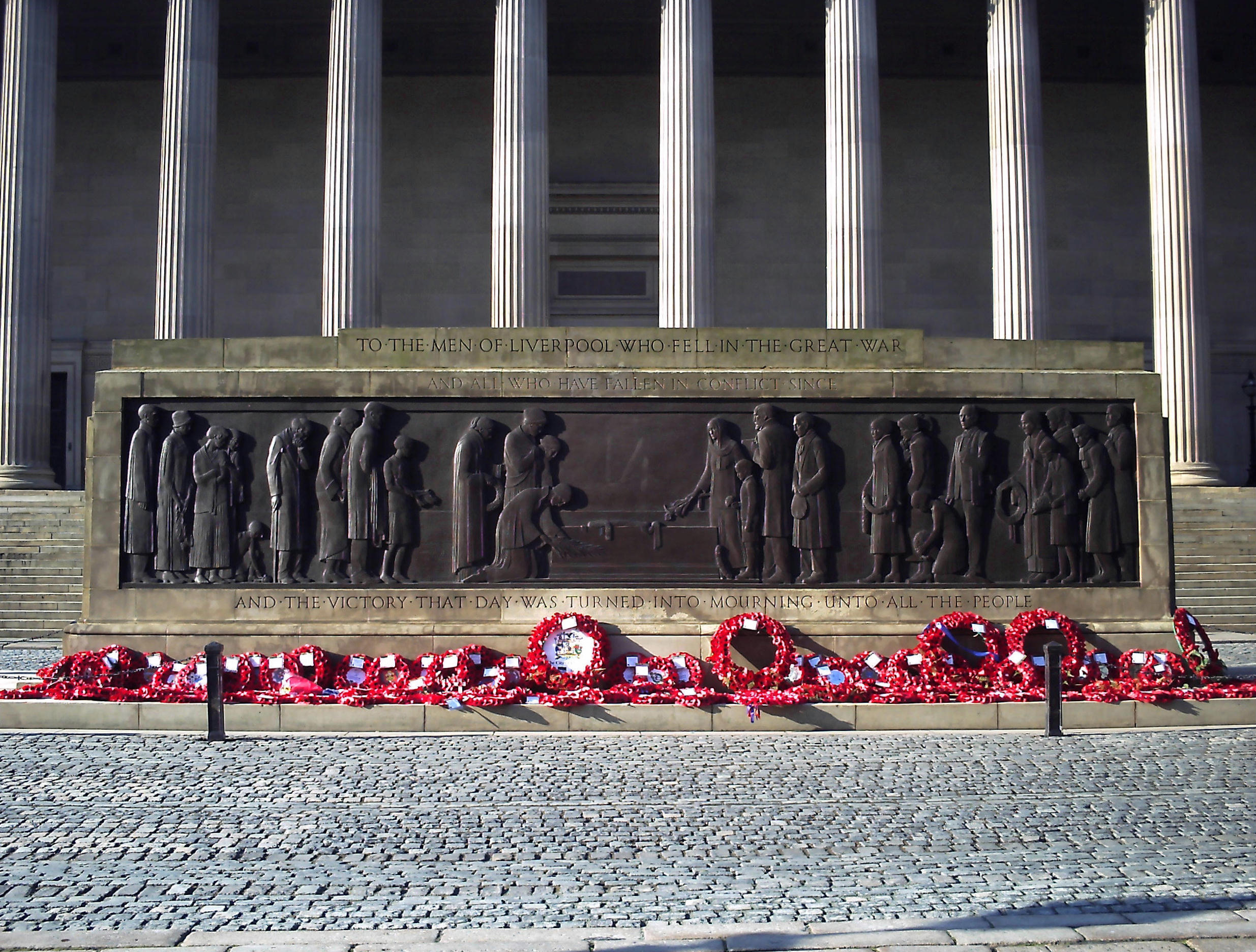
Liverpool Cenotaph

== St George's Plateau ==
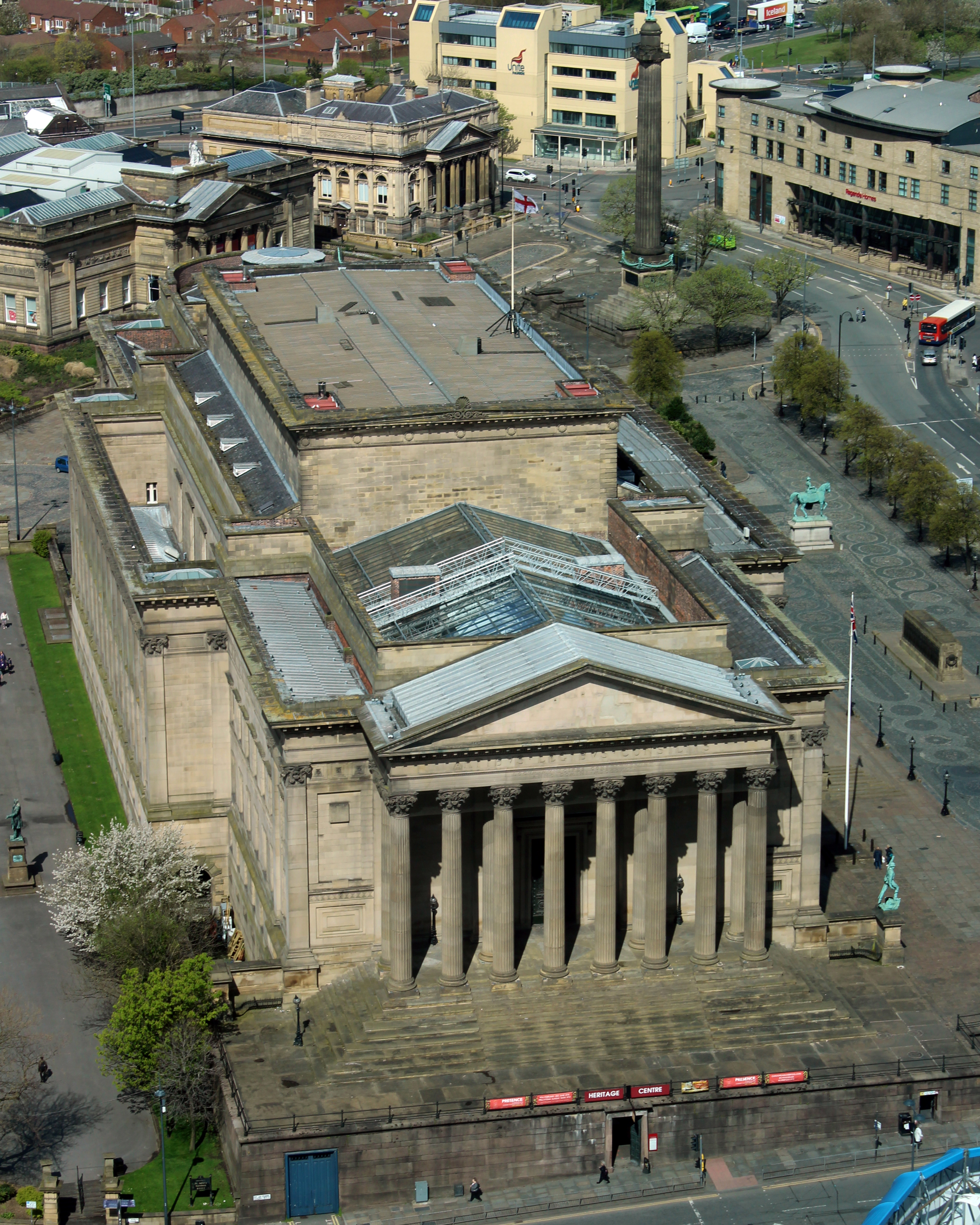
St George's Hall from St John's Beacon

This is the flat space between the hall and the railway station and contains statues of four lions by Nicholl and cast iron lamp standards with dolphin bases. Also on the plateau are monuments, including equestrian bronzes of Prince Albert and Queen Victoria by Thomas Thornycroft, and a monument to Major-General William Earle by Birch. Between the equestrian statues is the Grade I Liverpool Cenotaph which was unveiled in 1930, designed by L. B. Budden and sculpted by H. Tyson Smith. It consists of a simple horizontal block with a bronze relief measuring over 31 feet (9 m) on each side. Sharples and Pollard regard it as one of the most remarkable war memorials in the country.

In 2017 Liverpool City Council announced a £45m programme to re-design several major streets in the city centre, including Lime Street which would involve expanding the plateau. The work is timetabled to be completed by winter 2021.

== Restoration ==
Following the restoration leading to the reopening of the hall in April 2007 it was granted a Civic Trust Award. It included the creation of a Heritage Centre which gives an introduction to the hall and its history. Guided tours, a programme of exhibitions and talks are arranged. Over the Christmas periods of 2007 and 2008 an artificial skating rink was installed in the Concert Hall. In January 2008 Liverpool started its tenure as European Capital of Culture with the People's Opening at St George's Hall with a performance which included the Beatles' drummer Ringo Starr playing on its roof. The building has since been regularly used as a stage and backdrop for major civic and cultural events, from the city's Christmas Markets to the World War 1 tribute Weeping Window in 2015 and the Liverpool Giants in 2014 and 2018.

== As a filming location ==
The exterior of St George's Hall has been used a filming location for several films and television series, including the BBC series Peaky Blinders and The War of the Worlds, the 1993 film In the Name of the Father, the 2022 film The Batman,, the 2025 feature film Heads of State and the upcoming sequel The Batman: Part II. A 1987 advertisement for Coca-Cola was filmed inside the building.

St George's Hall was the main hub for the paranormal investigation show "Most Haunted Live" which based their January 2009 "Search for Evil" live event from the hall. The live events ran for a full week, running from Saturday 10 January 2009 until Friday 16 January 2009. The Most Haunted Live team investigated the alleged paranormal activities in the hall, as well as other locations across the north west. The hall was the main studio hub and interactive hub for this special live event which aired on the satellite/cable channel Living TV.

On 31 January 2023, St George's Hall hosted the semi-final allocation draw for the Eurovision Song Contest, which was held in Liverpool later in the year. The draw was broadcast live on BBC television and YouTube.

== Quotes about St George's Hall ==
"This magnificent edifice will be a perennial monument of the energy and public spirit, in the nineteenth century, of the people of Liverpool; a place which of all the cities and towns in the British Empire is surpassed only by the metropolis in magnitude, wealth and importance; and which in the quick yet solid growth of its commercial greatness surpasses even the metropolis itself". The Illustrated London News 23 September 1854

"The combination of a magnificent interior with an even grander exterior, is an achievement of which ancient Rome itself could offer no parallel, for however splendid and well organised were the interiors of the great thermae, basilicas and other structures, we have nothing to show that the exteriors of their buildings ever reached the same level of coherence and dignity. Indeed, all the remains point in the other direction. Hence the real greatness of Elmes' achievement". Charles Herbert Reilly

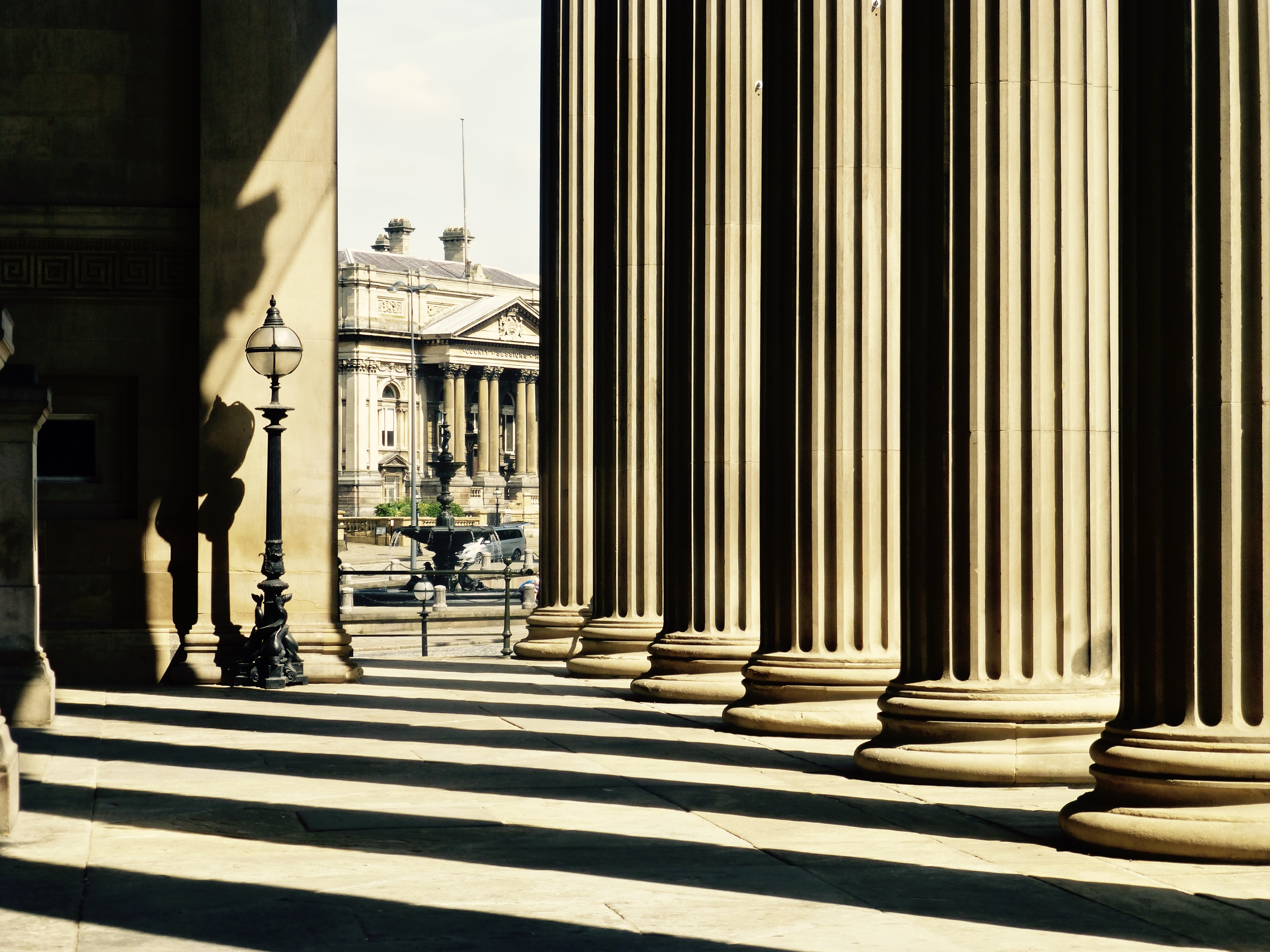
The Corinthian columns of St George's Hall

"The south end of St. George's Hall is quite conventional and rather resembles Donaldson's project for the Royal Exchange. Except for the superior proportions and the splendid pile of steps at the base (by Cockerell) - which rise however, much too abruptly from an exiguous terrace along St. John's Lane- this porticoed and pedimented facade is, in fact not very different from Tite's at the Exchange. The north end is not identical but has a semicircular projection housing the Concert Room in the first storey. The different treatment of the two ends hardly ever seen at once either from the east or west. The extreme severity of the rounded north end is quite out of accord with the new visual tastes of the Victorian Age for sharpened accents and complex rhythms. The podium below is barely broken by the simple frames of the two entrance doors (this is an error there are three doors at the north end); the parapet above is absolutely continuous and unornamented. Thus, there is no central focus of interest and nothing to distract attention from the even half-circle of giant Corinthian columns.

The unbroken length of the east portico is surmounted by an equally unbroken attic masking the vault of the main hall. Thus the effect is more severe. Ranges of square pilasters, for two-thirds of their height, are used here along the side wings. Such pilasters also rise like an open screen in the projecting middle section of the west front. These novel members provide a structural articulation recalling the aspects of Schinkel's Classicism as much as the long east portico does that of his Altes Museum. Though the scale of the composition is new to Britain, the spirit is still that of the classical rationalism which dominated the end of the 18th century. The scale and general severity reflect the ideas of French architects like Ledoux and Boulée in the Revolutionary epoch, dreams that were codified by Durand in his Précis des leçons d'architecture données à l'École royale polytechnique (1802–05) and thus transmitted to a later generation. Behind and between the columnar and pseudo-columnar elements which dominate the facades the wall surfaces are rather flat. The relief of the various panels articulating these surfaces and that of the unique window frames is very low. Windows are completely suppressed on the south and the east fronts; the mouldings throughout, though large in size because of the tremendous scale, are extremely refined, cold and quite unornamented." Henry-Russell Hitchcock

The following is about the Small Concert Hall: "Exquisite in color and covered with most elegant decoration in low relief, this room is above all a masterly exercise in the use of those 'shams' Camdenians most abominated. The balconies are of cast iron designed to look like some sort of woven wickerwork; of iron also are the pierced ventilating grilles along the front of the stage and in the ceiling panels around the central skylight. The delicate arabesques of the pilasters and friezes are papier-mâché. The graceful caryatids, seemingly sustaining the balcony on their fingertips, must be of iron or some synthetic composition; they were certainly never carved in stone. Whether these are themselves supports or whether the balcony is cantilevered on iron beams, the real construction is concealed. The wall panels not of wood but of plaster, supebly [sic] grained and varnished. Only the mirrors between the columns on the stage are what they seem; yet by a final paradox they create a faery unreality by their repeated reflection." Henry-Russell Hitchcock

"Judging from his numerous perspective sketches, Elmes had the ability to rapidly design a building in perspective; not only did he prepare numerous sketches of the exterior, but also perspective views of the interior of the great loggia, and various other features. His full-size details, although Classic in spirit, are essentially modern in character; every suite of mouldings received due consideration as to its placing, and its ultimate relation to the scheme as a whole. Nothing could surpass the beauty of the Neo-Grec ornament selected for terminating the dominating attic. The whole building fulfils the highest canons of the academic style, and is unsurpassed by any other modern building in Europe. Albert Richardson

== See also ==
- Grade I listed buildings in Liverpool
- Architecture of Liverpool
- List of public art in Liverpool
- Baths of Caracalla
