= McCreery =

McCreery is a surname of Ulster origin. It is derived from the Irish and Scottish Gaelic surname Mac Ruidhrí.

== People with the surname ==
- Adam McCreery (born 1992), American baseball player
- Beau McCreery (born 2001), Australian rules footballer
- Charles McCreery (born 1942), British psychologist and author
- Christopher McCreery (born 1975), Canadian historian
- David McCreery (born 1957), Northern Irish footballer
- Ed McCreery (1889–1960), American Major League Baseball pitcher
- Joey McCreery (1902–1989), American actress and screenwriter, known professionally as Marion Mack
- John McCreery (disambiguation), multiple people
  - John McCreery (printer) (c. 1768–1832), Irish printer
  - John W. McCreery (1845–1917), West Virginia State Senator
  - John Alexander McCreery (1884–1948), American surgeon
- Maud Leonard McCreery (1883–1938), American suffragist, pacifist, labor activist, educator and newspaper editor
- Ned McCreery (c. 1945 – 1992), Northern Irish Loyalist paramilitary
- Richard McCreery (1898–1967), British army general
- Scotty McCreery (born 1993), American singer
- Thomas C. McCreery (1816–1890), U.S. senator from Kentucky
- Tom McCreery (1874–1941), American baseball player
- Wayman C. McCreery (1851–1901), American real estate agent, opera composer and internal revenue collector of St. Louis
- William McCreery (disambiguation), multiple people
  - William McCreery (Maryland politician), American representative from Maryland
  - William McCreery (Pennsylvania politician), American representative from Pennsylvania
  - William B. McCreery, American mayor for the City of Flint, Michigan State Treasurer and diplomat
  - William C. McCreery (1896–1988), American lawyer and member of the New York State Assembly

== Other uses ==
- McCreery, West Virginia, United States

== See also ==
- McCreary, a list of people with the surname
