= McCrory (surname) =

McCrory is a surname. It is derived from the Irish and Scottish Gaelic surname Mac Ruaidhrí.

== People with the surname ==
- Ann McCrory (born 1956), former First Lady of North Carolina, former First Lady of Charlotte, North Carolina
- Glenn McCrory (born 1964), British professional boxer
- Helen McCrory (1968–2021), English actress
- Mary Angeline Teresa McCrory (1893–1984), Irish religious sister
- Milton McCrory (born 1962), American professional boxer
- Nick McCrory (born 1991), American diver
- Pat McCrory (born 1956), former governor of North Carolina (2013–2017), former mayor of Charlotte, North Carolina (1995–2009)
- Sammy McCrory (1924–2011), Northern Ireland footballer
- Sam McCrory (loyalist) (born 1963), gay rights activist and former UDA activist
- Steve McCrory (1964–2000), American amateur boxer
- Tamdan McCrory (born 1986), American mixed martial arts fighter

== See also ==
- McCrary (surname)
- McCrorey (disambiguation)
- McRory
