= Macrorie =

Macrorie may refer to:

- Macrorie, Saskatchewan, village in Canada
- Macrorie (surname)

== See also ==
- McCrorie, a surname
