= McCreary (disambiguation) =

McCreary is a surname.

McCreary may refer to:

== Places ==
- McCreary County, Kentucky
  - McCreary County Airport
  - United States Penitentiary, McCreary, a high-security federal prison
- Rural Municipality of McCreary, Manitoba, Canada
- McCreary, Manitoba, a village
  - McCreary Airport
- McCrearys, a community within the town of Mississippi Mills, Ontario, Canada

== Other ==
- McCreary Tire Company, a racing tire brand that is known for dirt track racing and also earning one pole in the NASCAR Sprint Cup Series

== See also ==
- McCreery
