= Henry Fulke Plantagenet Woolicombe Hole =

English wood engraver

- Died: 1820
- Occupation: Wood engraver

Henry Fulke Plantagenet Woolicombe Hole (died 1820) was an English wood engraver.

== Biography ==
Hole was the son of an officer in the Lancashire militia, who belonged to an old Devonshire family. He resided in Liverpool, and was one of the pupils of Thomas Bewick. He cut some of the water-birds in "The British Birds." A book-plate cut by him is dated 1798. He cut eight designs by John Thurston for John McCreery's poem "The Press," published at Liverpool in 1803; others for Mrs. Felicia Hemans's "Poems," 1808; some of the designs by Thurston for Rudolph Ackermann's "Religious Emblems," 1809; "Six Views in the Neighbourhood of Liverpool" in Matthew Gregson's "Portfolio," 1817, &c. He was a member of the Liverpool Academy, and in 1814 contributed to their exhibition "An Attempt to restore the Old Method of Cross-lining on Wood," by himself. Hole subsequently inherited from an uncle the estate of Ebberley Hall, Devonshire, and retired from the profession. He died in 1820.
