= John McArthur (artist and merchant) =

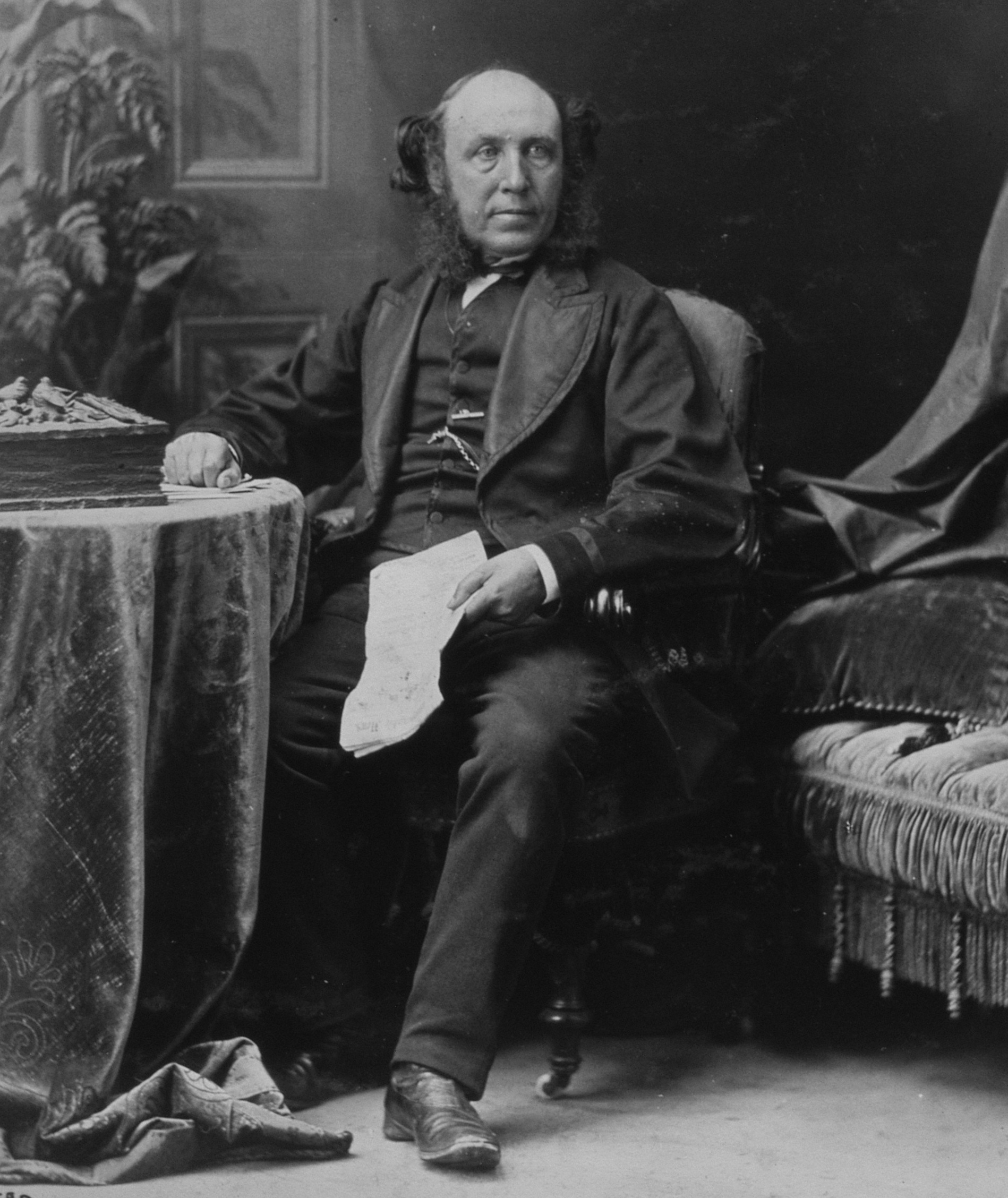
- Born: 1814; Hamilton, Scotland
- Died: May 5, 1903; Montreal, Canada
- Resting place: Mount Royal Cemetery

John McArthur, born in 1814 in Hamilton, Scotland, United Kingdom, and died on May 5, 1903, in Montreal, Canada, was a British-born Canadian artist, house and commercial painter and decorator, businessman, and merchant.

As a painter, John McArthur was primarily a landscape painter, a follower of the Barbizon School. He was also one of the first members of the Art Association of Montreal.

== Biography ==
John McArthur was born in 1814 in Hamilton, Lanarkshire, Scotland, United Kingdom. After practicing his craft as a painter and house painter, notably in the cities of Dublin, Edinburgh, Glasgow, and Belfast, he decided to emigrate to Montreal, Canada, in 1845. In 1846, he entered into partnership with Alexander Ramsay, a paint, oil, and varnish dealer, with whom he offered complementary services, including house painting, decorative painting, glazier, and upholsterer. During the 1850s, Ramsay and McArthur hired British glassmaker John C. Spence to offer stained glass and glass enameling services. Together, they notably oversaw the manufacturing of the glazing for the Notre-Dame-de-Grâce Church in Montreal in 1853. On December 1, 1854, the firm of Ramsay and McArthur was dissolved by mutual consent.

From 1855 to 1860, John McArthur continued to offer his services as a house & commercial painter and decorator and upholsterer. He opened a shop at "70 Grande rue Saint-Jacques" on May 1, 1856. In 1858, he designed the decoration of the Theatre Royal in Montreal. On May 12, 1860, he joined forces with his former glassmaker colleague John C. Spence. During the royal visit of Prince Edward of Wales in 1860, McArthur and Spence designed and decorated at least six of the temporary triumphal arches erected in the city of Montreal, the temporary ballroom building and the residence of the Honorable John Rose which was used as Prince Edward's temporary residence in Montreal.

Around 1862, John McArthur ended his partnership with John C. Spence, and decided to partner with his own son, John C. McArthur. In 1866, McArthur & Son painted the ceiling decorations of a store at the corner of St-Jaques and Place Victoria. In 1867, the firm painted the ceiling decorations of the Merchants' Bank building at Place d'Armes. In 1872, the firm may also have painted the ballroom of Ravenscrag in Montreal. In this regard, his paintings "beautified many Montreal residences." In 1882, he retired and his son took over the management of the firm and went into partnership with C. C. Corneille, under the name McArthur, Corneille & Co., until 1900. John McArthur died on May 5, 1903, in Montreal, Canada.

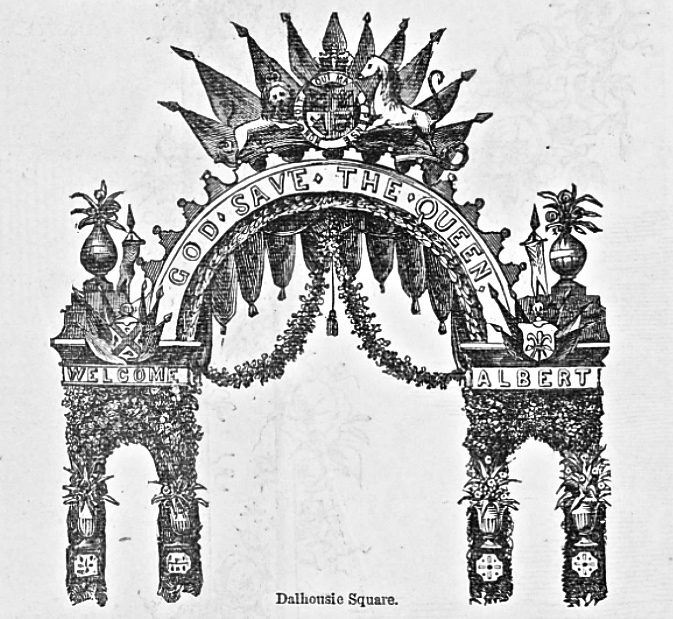
Triumph Arch on Dalhousie Square, Montreal, Canada.

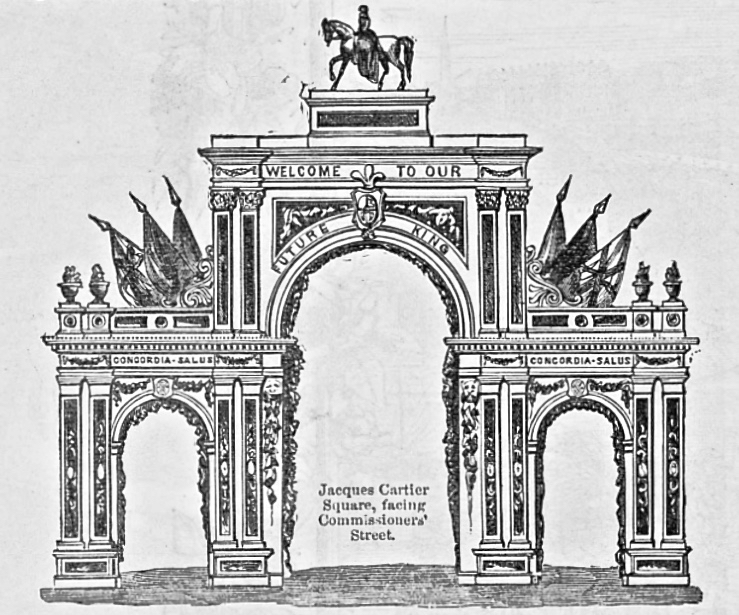
Triumph Arch on Place Jacques-Cartier, Montreal, Canada.

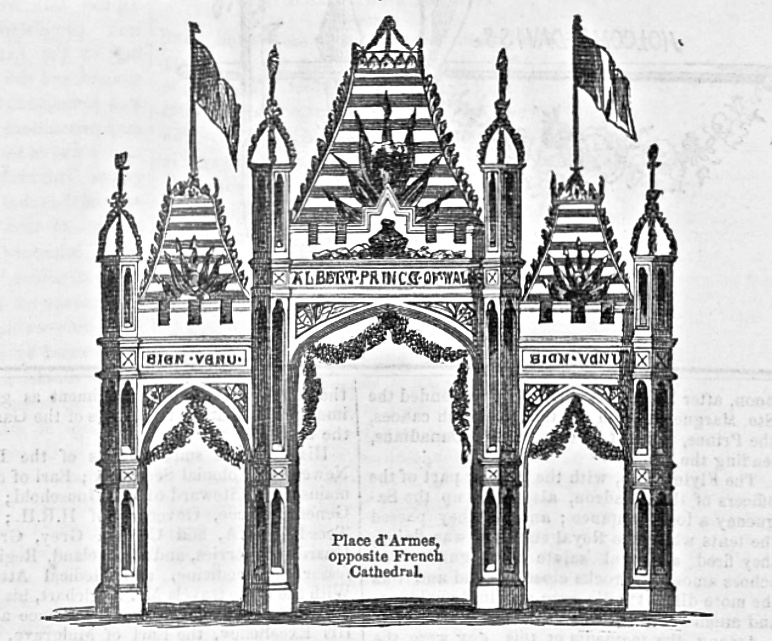
Triumph Arch on Place d'Armes, Montreal, Canada.

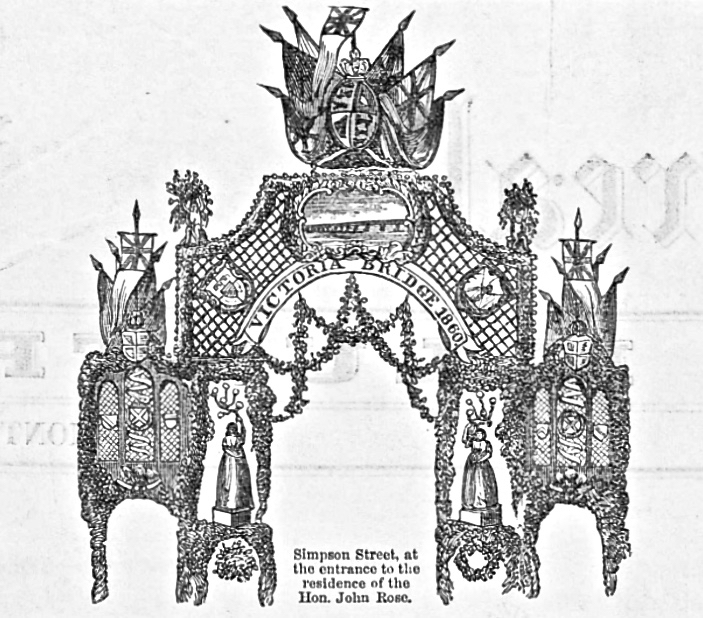
Triumph Arch on Simpson Street, Montreal, Canada.

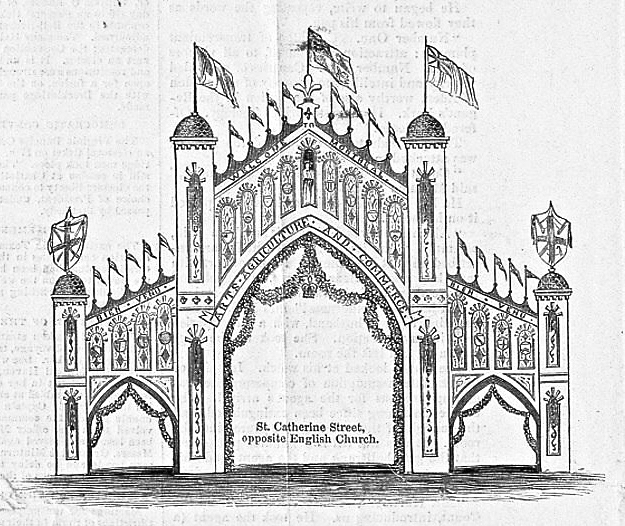
Triumph Arch on Saint Catherine Street, Montreal, Canada.

== McArthur and the artists ==
Throughout his career, John McArthur surrounded himself with artists to fulfill his various contracts. His presence in Montreal's artistic community allowed him to select talented artists. For example, he was one of the first members of the Art Association of Montreal.

Here is a non-exhaustive list of artists who worked with John McArthur:

- Francis Pedretti, house painter and decorator (1860s).
- Alexander Ramsay, house painter and decorator (1840s and 1850s).
- M. Rosner (of New York), house painter and decorator (1850s).
- John C. Spence, master stained glassmaker (1850s and 1860s).

== Exhibitions and distinctions ==
As a painter, John McArthur was essentially a landscape painter, a follower of the Barbizon School. Moreover, during his retirement in the 1880s, he went to Barbizon and Cernay-la-Ville several times to meet other artists of this artistic movement and perfect his art. Canadian landscapes were the main subject of the paintings he exhibited during his life, but not only.

Below is a non-exhaustive list of exhibitions at which John McArthur or one of his firms exhibited works:

- February 5, 1850, 8th Festival of the Mechanics' Institute of Montreal:
  - Two imitation marble pedestals.
- October 17–19, 1850, Provincial Exhibition (Department of Industry):
  - Seven imitation wood and marble paintings by Ramsay & McArthur: Special Prize.
- September 27–30, 1853, Provincial Exhibition (Department of Industry, Section 8: Fine Arts):
  - Copy of an oil painting on canvas depicting a landscape, by Ramsay & McArthur: Recommended Second Prize;
  - Bedroom set with enameled glass panels painted with landscapes, fruit, and other decorations, by Ramsay & McArthur: Commended and Special Prize.
  - Table decorated with enameled glass, by Ramsay & McArthur: Commended and Special Prize.
  - Stained glass windows, by Ramsay & McArthur (no prize).
- August 12–August 26, 1857, Art Exhibition presented by the Mercantile Library Association at Bonaventure Hall:
  - "Storm on the Thames," a copy by John McArthur of an oil painting on canvas.
- August 25–September 8, 1860, Great Exhibition (Department of Industry, Section 7: Fine Arts):
  - Stained glass windows, by McArthur & Spence: Silver Medal.
- September 15–October, 1863, Provincial Exhibition (Department of Industry, 2nd class, Section A):
  - Marble imitation on wooden panel by J. McArthur & Son: 1st prize and diploma
- December 8, 1887, Art Fair organized by The Art Gallery:
  - “Canadian Landscape,” an oil painting on canvas by John McArthur.

== Sources ==
=== Books / works ===
- The Act of incorporation (23d Vic., cap. 13) and the by-laws. Montreal (QC), Canada: M. Longmoore & Co., Gazette Steam Press. January 4, 1864. p. 45.
- The authorized official catalogue of the grand Dominion Exhibition. Montreal (QC), Canada: W.H. Tapson. September 24, 1880. p. 114. ISBN 978-0-665-57055-1.
- Harper, J. Russell (1970). Early painters and engravers in Canada. Birkenhead (England): University of Toronto Press. p. 398. ISBN 0-8020-1630-8.

=== Notorial acts ===
List of notorial acts in chronological order of publication:

- Jones Gibb, Isaac (Notary) (May 6, 1852). Notorial Act en minute, min. no. 13791: "John McArthur: Protest noted Steamer Britannia". Notaries Records, Judicial District of Montreal: Superior Court Funds, National Archives of Quebec. AN-13791.
- Jones Gibb, Isaac (Notary) (February 21, 1854). Notorial Act en minute, min. no. 15359: "Ramsay & McArthur: Agreement with John C. Spence". Notaries Records, Judicial District of Montreal: Superior Court Funds, National Archives of Quebec. AN-15359.
- Jones Gibb, Isaac (Notary) (December 12, 1854). Notorial Act en minute, min. no. 15998: "Ramsay, Alex & John McArthur: Dissolution of Copartnership". Notaries Records, Judicial District of Montreal: Superior Court Funds, National Archives of Quebec. AN-15998.
- Jones Gibb, Isaac (Notary) (January 1, 1855). Notorial Act en minute, min. no. 16040: "Ramsay & McArthur: Cancellation of agreement with John C. Spence". Notaries Records, Judicial District of Montreal: Superior Court Funds, National Archives of Quebec. AN-16040.
- Stewart Hunter, James (Notary) (July 31, 1856). Notorial Act en minute, min. no. 1553: "Contract and Agreement between the Royal Institution of Advancement of Learning and Alex Ramsay" (Cote: CN601,S208). Notaries Records, Judicial District of Montreal: Superior Court Funds, National Archives of Quebec. AN-1553.
- Jones Gibb, Isaac (Notary) (August 29, 1857). Notorial Act en minute, min. no. 17564: "John McArthur: Contract with Joseph Bélanger & Fançois-Xavier Boire". Notaries Records, Judicial District of Montreal: Superior Court Funds, National Archives of Quebec. AN-17564.
- Jones Gibb, Isaac (Notary) (August 29, 1857). Notorial Act en minute, min. no. 17565: "John McArthur: Contract with Aitken & Morrison". Notaries Records, Judicial District of Montreal: Superior Court Funds, National Archives of Quebec. AN-17565.
- Smith, James (Notary) (March 11, 1871). Notorial Act en minute, min. no. 24664: "Last Will and Testament of John McArthur". Notaries Records, Judicial District of Montreal: Superior Court Funds, National Archives of Quebec. AN-24664.

=== Newspaper articles ===
- "AVIS: Ramsay & McArthur, peintres de maison, d'enseigne et de décoration, vitriers, tapissiers, etc". L'aurore des Canada (Newspaper) (in French). Vol. 8, no. 23 (F. Cinq-Mars ed.). Montreal (QC), Canada. June 3, 1846. p. 2.
- "Mechanics' Festival. Catalogue of articles exhibited at the eighth annual festival of the Montreal Mechanics' Institute, February 5, 1850". The Quebec Gazette (Newspaper). Vol. 86, no. 7235 (printed by Brown & Gilmore ed.). Montreal (QC), Canada. February 16, 1850. p. 1.
- "Ramsay & McArthur. Painters and Color Dealers, Nos 58 and 60, McGill Street, Montreal". Montreal Herald and Daily Commercial Gazette (Newspaper). Vol. 42, no. 189 (Robert Weir ed.). Montreal (QC), Canada. October 7, 1850. p. 3.
- "List of persons who have been adjudged to receive prizes and diplomas at the Industrial Exhibition". The Quebec Mercury (Newspaper). Vol. 88, no. 7360 (Josiah Blackburn & George T. Cary ed.). Montreal (QC), Canada. October 28, 1850. p. 1.
- "Great improvement in Painting ! China Gloss, & Zinc White. Ramzay & McArthur, Plain and Decorative Painters, 58 and 60, McGill Street". Montreal Herald and Daily Commercial Gazette (Newspaper). Vol. 42, no. 68 (Robert Weir ed.). Montreal (QC), Canada. May 20, 1851. p. 1.
- "Ramsay & McArthur. Paint and Glass Store, 58 and 60, McGill Street". Montreal Herald and Daily Commercial Gazette (Supplement) (Newspaper). Vol. 44, no. 185 (Robert Weir ed.). Montreal (QC), Canada. October 2, 1852. p. 1.
- "Painted Glass". Montreal Herald and Daily Commercial Gazette (Newspaper). Vol. 45, no. 183 (Robert Weir ed.). Montreal (QC), Canada. September 30, 1853. p. 2.
- "Provincial Exhibition. PART II, Section 8: Fine Arts". Montreal Herald and Daily Commercial Gazette (Supplement) (Newspaper). Vol. 45, no. 192 (Robert Weir ed.). Montreal (QC), Canada. October 11, 1853. p. 1.
- "Dissolution of Co-Partnership. Ramsay & McArthur". Montreal Herald and Daily Commercial Gazette (Newspaper). Vol. 46, no. 251 (Robert Weir ed.). Montreal (QC), Canada. December 9, 1854. p. 3.
- "Died. Frances Ramsay McArthur". Montreal Herald and Daily Commercial Gazette (Newspaper). Vol. 47, no. 7 (Robert Weir ed.). Montreal (QC), Canada. January 9, 1855. p. 2.
- "Painting & Glazing. Greer & White". Montreal Herald and Daily Commercial Gazette (Newspaper). Vol. 47, no. 99 (Robert Weir ed.). Montreal (QC), Canada. April 28, 1855. p. 3.
- "John McArthur. House, Sign, and Ornemental Painter, Glazier, Paper-Hanger, &c". Montreal Herald and Daily Commercial Gazette (Newspaper). Vol. 47, no. 175 (Robert Weir ed.). Montreal (QC), Canada. July 26, 1855. p. 1.
- "Fine Arts. Catalogue of Oil Paintings on Exhibition on Bonaventure Hall". Montreal Herald and Daily Commercial Gazette (Newspaper). Vol. 49, no. 195 (Robert Weir ed.). Montreal (QC), Canada. August 18, 1857. p. 2.
- "Fine Arts. Catalogue of Oil Paintings on Exhibition on Bonaventure Hall (Continued)". Montreal Herald and Daily Commercial Gazette (Newspaper). Vol. 49, no. 196 (Robert Weir ed.). Montreal (QC), Canada. August 19, 1857. p. 2.
- "Opening of the Theatre Royal". Montreal Herald and Daily Commercial Gazette (Newspaper). Vol. 50, no. 126 (Robert Weir ed.). Montreal (QC), Canada. May 31, 1858. p. 2.
- "Opening services, and dedication of the church of the Messiah". Montreal Herald and Daily Commercial Gazette (Newspaper). Vol. 50, no. 218 (Robert Weir ed.). Montreal (QC), Canada. September 14, 1858. p. 2.
- "Co-Partnership Notice: McArthur & Spence". Montreal Herald and Daily Commercial Gazette (Newspaper). Vol. 52, no. 115 (Robert Weir ed.). Montreal (QC), Canada. May 14, 1860. p. 2.
- "M'Arthur & Spence. Importers and Dealers in Paints, Oils, Glass, Varnishes, ... House, Sign & Decorative Painters". Montreal Herald and Daily Commercial Gazette (Newspaper). Vol. 52, no. 115 (Robert Weir ed.). Montreal (QC), Canada. May 14, 1860. p. 2.
- "M'Arthur & Spence, Importateurs et Marchands". L'Ordre: union catholique (Newspaper) (in French). Vol. 60, no. 16 (Plinguet & Laplante ed.). Montreal (QC), Canada. May 16, 1860. p. 2.
- "The Ball-Room Building". Montreal Herald and Daily Commercial Gazette (Newspaper). Vol. 52, no. 153 (Robert Weir ed.). Montreal (QC), Canada. June 27, 1860. p. 2.
- "The interior of the Building (The Ball-Room Building)". Montreal Herald and Daily Commercial Gazette (Newspaper). Vol. 52, no. 191 (Robert Weir ed.). Montreal (QC), Canada. August 10, 1860. p. 2.
- "The Montreal Residence of His Royal Highness The Prince of Wales". Montreal Herald and Daily Commercial Gazette (Newspaper). Vol. 52, no. 196 (Robert Weir ed.). Montreal (QC), Canada. August 16, 1860. p. 2.
- "Visit of the The Prince of Wales to Montreal. The Six Triumphal Arches". Montreal Herald and Daily Commercial Gazette (Newspaper). Vol. 52, no. 199 (Robert Weir ed.). Montreal (QC), Canada. August 20, 1860. p. 2.
- "Visit of the The Prince of Wales to Montreal. The Six Triumphal Arches". Montreal Herald and Daily Commercial Gazette (Illustrated Supplement) (Newspaper). Vol. 52, no. 204 (Robert Weir ed.). Montreal (QC), Canada. August 25, 1860. p. 2.
- "The Ball. The interior of the Building". Montreal Herald and Daily Commercial Gazette (Newspaper). Vol. 52, no. 206 (Robert Weir ed.). Montreal (QC), Canada. August 28, 1860. p. 2.
- "The Meeting of the Subscribers to the Citizens' Reception Fund". Montreal Herald and Daily Commercial Gazette (Newspaper). Vol. 52, no. 214 (Robert Weir ed.). Montreal (QC), Canada. September 7, 1860. p. 2.
- "Mechanics' Institute. Report". Montreal Herald and Daily Commercial Gazette (Newspaper). Vol. 52, no. 234 (Robert Weir ed.). Montreal (QC), Canada. October 1, 1860. p. 2.
- "Provincial Exhibition. Board of Arts - Prize List - (Continued) -- Class VII". The Daily Witness (Newspaper). Vol. 1, no. 51 (John Dougall ed.). Montreal (QC), Canada. October 12, 1860. p. 2.
- "Fresco Painting. Interior Decoration of Dwellings, Churches & Public Buildings (F. Pedretti)". Montreal Herald and Daily Commercial Gazette (Newspaper). Vol. 53, no. 128 (Robert Weir ed.). Montreal (QC), Canada. May 29, 1861. p. 2.
- "The Exhibition. Industrial Department". Montreal Herald and Daily Commercial Gazette (Newspaper). Vol. 55, no. 221 (Robert Weir ed.). Montreal (QC), Canada. September 16, 1863. p. 2.
- "Exposition Provinciale. Liste des prix (Département Industriel, 2e classe, Section A)". Le pays (Newspaper) (in French). Vol. 12, no. 105 (Montréal: Le pays,1852-1871 ed.). Montreal (QC), Canada. September 29, 1863. p. 1.
- "Midnight Dispatches. New Dry Goods Store". Montreal Herald and Daily Commercial Gazette (Newspaper). Vol. 58, no. 78 (Robert Weir ed.). Montreal (QC), Canada. April 2, 1866. p. 2.
- "Progress of Montreal (Illustrated Edition). Merchants' Bank". Montreal Herald and Daily Commercial Gazette (Newspaper). Vol. 59, no. (Double Sheet) (Robert Weir ed.). Montreal (QC), Canada. March 1, 1867. p. 6.
- "Fire". The Daily Witness (Newspaper). Vol. 8, no. 72 (John Dougall ed.). Montreal (QC), Canada. March 26, 1867. p. 2.
- "John McArthur & Son (Ad)". Canadian Illustrated News (Newspaper). Vol. 16, no. 6 (Geo. E. Desbarats ed.). Montreal (QC), Canada. February 16, 1878. p. 15.
- "Dominion Exhibition. In the Annex: A Moth Proof Cabinet". The Daily Witness (Newspaper). Vol. 19, no. 225 (John Dougall ed.). Montreal (QC), Canada. September 24, 1880. p. 2.
- "Paints. Montreal, Que". Oil, Paint and Drug Reporter (Newspaper). Vol. 22, no. 2 (William O. Allison ed.). Montreal (QC), Canada. July 12, 1882. p. 61.
- ""Ye Art Fair". The Art Gallery and The Contributors Thereto". The Montreal daily herald and daily commercial gazette (Newspaper). Vol. 79, no. 292 (The Herald Company ed.). Montreal (QC), Canada. December 8, 1887. p. 4.
- "Extra: Renseignements commerciaux: Province de Québec. Dissolution de sociétés". Le Prix courant: journal du commerce (Newspaper) (in French). Vol. 28, no. 5 (Compagnie de Publication des marchands détailleurs du Canada Limitée ed.). Montreal (QC), Canada. May 4, 1900. p. 365.
- "Mr. John M'Arthur dies after a long sickness. Retired Montreal Merchant Was Prominent in His Time in Business and Artistic Circles". The Montreal daily herald and daily commercial gazette (Newspaper). Vol. 95, no. 105 (The Herald Publishing Company ed.). Montreal (QC), Canada. May 6, 1903. p. 2.
