= McCrary =

McCrary may refer to:

- McCrary, Mississippi, a village in the United States
- Runyon v. McCrary, a Supreme Court of the United States case
- McCrary (surname), people with the surname McCrary
