= John McCreery =

John McCreery is the name of:

- John McCreery (printer) (c. 1768 – 1832), Irish printer
- John W. McCreery (1845–1917), West Virginia State Senator
- John Alexander McCreery (1884–1948), American surgeon
