= McCreedy =

McCreedy or Mccreedy is a surname. Notable people with the surname include:

- Conor Mccreedy (born 1987), South African artist
- Johnny McCreedy (1917–1979), Canadian ice hockey player

== See also ==
- McCready
- McCreery
