= Mackrory =

Mackrory is a surname. Notable people with the surname include:

- Cherilyn Mackrory, British Member of Parliament elected 2019
- Lawrence Mackrory, singer with Swedish bands Darkane and Andromeda

== See also ==
- McRory
- Mac Ruaidhrí
