= McGrory =

McGrory is a surname. It is derived from the Irish and Scottish Gaelic surname Mac Ruaidhrí.

== People with the surname ==
- Amanda McGrory (born 1986), American wheelchair racer
- Billy McGlory (1850–1928), American saloon keeper and underworld figure
- Bob McGrory (1891–1954), Scottish footballer
- Frank McGrory (born 1933), American lawyer
- Jackie McGrory (1941–2004), Scottish footballer
- Jimmy McGrory (1904–1982), Scottish footballer and manager
- John McGrory, Scottish footballer
- Johnny McGrory (1915–1998), Scottish boxer of the 1930s and '40s
- Kelly McGrory (born 1996), Irish track and field athlete
- Mary McGrory (1918–2004), American journalist and columnist
- Matthew McGrory (1973–2005), American actor
- Scott McGrory (born 1969), Australian cyclist
- Shaun McGrory (born 1968), English footballer
