= William Spence (sculptor) =

British sculptor

William Spence (1793–1849) was an early 19th century British sculptor.

== Life ==
He was born in Chester in 1793 and showed artistic talent at an early age. He was sent to Liverpool to study drawing and carving under a Mr Pether. In Liverpool he met and befriended John Gibson who was working nearby at Samuel Francey's yard and got Spence a job in this yard.

Spence went into partnership with Francey in 1819.

He exhibited at the Royal Academy from 1821 to 1844.

He was given the post of Professor of Drawing at Liverpool Academy of Arts. He died in Liverpool in 1849.

== Works ==
- "Young Hymen" exhibited at Liverpool Academy of Arts (1812)
- Cupid Riding a Dolphin (1813)
- Bust of William Roscoe (1813) (now in the National Portrait Gallery, London)
- Monument to Rachel Roe in Christ Church in Macclesfield (1819)
- Bust of Thomas Leyland (1822)
- Bust of Sir John Gladstone, 1st Baronet (1824)
- Bust of Benjanin Heywood (1824)
- Bust of George Canning (1824)
- Bust of William Hope (1824)
- Bust of John Foster (1827)
- Monument to Edward Rowland at Ruabon (1828)
- Bust of George Canning (1828)
- Bust of J B Hollinshead (1828)
- Monument to Mary Williams at Corwen (1829)
- Monument to John Gore St James Cemetery Chapel in Liverpool (1830)
- Monument to Margarrette Golightly at Gresford (1831)
- Statue of William Roscoe (1832)
- Memorial to Rev James Archer at Middleton, Lancashire (1832)
- Bust of Robert Prescott (1834)
- Monument to John and Henry Fletcher at Overton, Flintshire (1834)
- Monument to Michael Heathcote at Ormskirk (1835)
- Bust of Lord Sandon (1836)
- Monument to Catherine Shufflebotham at Betley (1836)
- Monument to Harriet Vyse at Holmes Chapel (1836)
- Monument to Sarah Vawdrey at Middlewich (1837)
- Bust of Sir Walter Scott (1837)
- Monument to Margaret Hoskins at Melling, Lancashire (1838)
- Monument to Elizabeth Latham at Sandbach (1839)
- Monument to Thomas Parker at Colne (1842)
- Monument to Anne Goodwin at Gresford (1842)
- "Caractacus before Claudius Caesar" (1844)
- Monument to Milborne Tynte at Goathurst (1845)
- Monument to Joseph Bradbury at Huddersfield Parish Church (1845)
- Monument to Henry Swetenham at Astbury (dnk)

== Collections ==
Spence's work is held in the permanent collection of the British Museum, the National Portrait Gallery, among others.

== Family ==
He was father to Benjamin Edward Spence, and to John C. Spence.
