= McRory =

McRory is a surname. It is derived from the Irish surname Mac Ruaidhrí.

- Art McRory, Northern Irish Gaelic football manager
- John McRory (1834–1893), Canadian merchant and politician

== See also ==
- McCrory (disambiguation)
- Mackrory, surname
