= McCrery =

McCrery is a surname. It is derived from the Irish and Scottish Gaelic surnames Mac Ruidhrí and Mac Ruaidhrí.

== People with the surname ==
- Jim McCrery (born 1949), American lawyer and politician
- Nigel McCrery (1953–2025), English screenwriter, producer and writer
