= McCrory =

McCrory may refer to:

== People ==
- McCrory (surname)

== Places ==
- McCrory, Arkansas, United States
- McCrory Gardens and South Dakota Arboretum

== Businesses ==
- McCrory Stores

== See also ==
- McCrorey (disambiguation)
