= McRorie =

McRorie is a surname. It is derived from the Scottish Gaelic surname Mac Ruaidhrí.

== People with the surname ==
- Danny McRorie (1906–1963), Scottish footballer
- Gordon McRorie (born 1988), Canadian rugby union player
- Sally McRorie, American psychologist and painter

== See also ==
- Carolyn Darbyshire-McRorie (born 1963), Canadian curler
