= McCrorie =

McCrorie is a surname. It is derived from the Scottish Gaelic surname Mac Ruidhrí.

== Notable people with the surname ==
- Edward McCrorie (born 1936), American poet and academic of English literature
- Stevie McCrorie (born 1985), Scottish singer
