= Macrorie (surname) =

Macrorie is a surname of Scottish origin which means "son of Roderick." Notable people with the surname include:

- Alma Macrorie (1904–1970), American film editor and actress
- William Macrorie (1831–1905), bishop of Maritzburg
