= Bill McCreary =

Bill McCreary may refer to:

- Bill McCreary Sr. (1934–2019), ice hockey player in the National Hockey League
- Bill McCreary Jr. (born 1960), his son, ice hockey player in the National Hockey League
- Bill McCreary (referee) (born 1955), nephew of Bill McCreary Sr., ice hockey referee in the National Hockey League
