= McCrary (surname) =

McCrary is a surname. It is derived from the Scottish Gaelic surname Mac Ruidhrí.

== People with the surname ==
- Darius McCrary (born 1976), American actor
- Donny McCrary (born 1982), American boxer
- Frank McCrary (1849–1921), American photographer
- Fred McCrary (born 1972, American football player
- George W. McCrary (1835–1890), American politician
- Greg McCrary (1952–2013), American football player
- Gregg McCrary (born 1945), American FBI agent, author and professor
- Howard McCrary, American musician, entertainer and actor
- JayDon McCrary (born 2007), American singer, actor and dancer
- Jesse J. McCrary Jr. (1937–2007), American politician from Florida
- Jim McCrary (1939–2012), American photographer
- Michael McCrary (born 1970), American football player
- Milo McCrary, a fictional character from American sitcom Drake & Josh
- Nate McCrary (born 1999), American football player
- Roscoe McCrary (1922-1991), American politician from Missouri
- Tex McCrary (1910–2003), American journalist and public relations specialist
- Victor McCrary (born 1955), American physical chemist
