= John C. Spence (artist) =

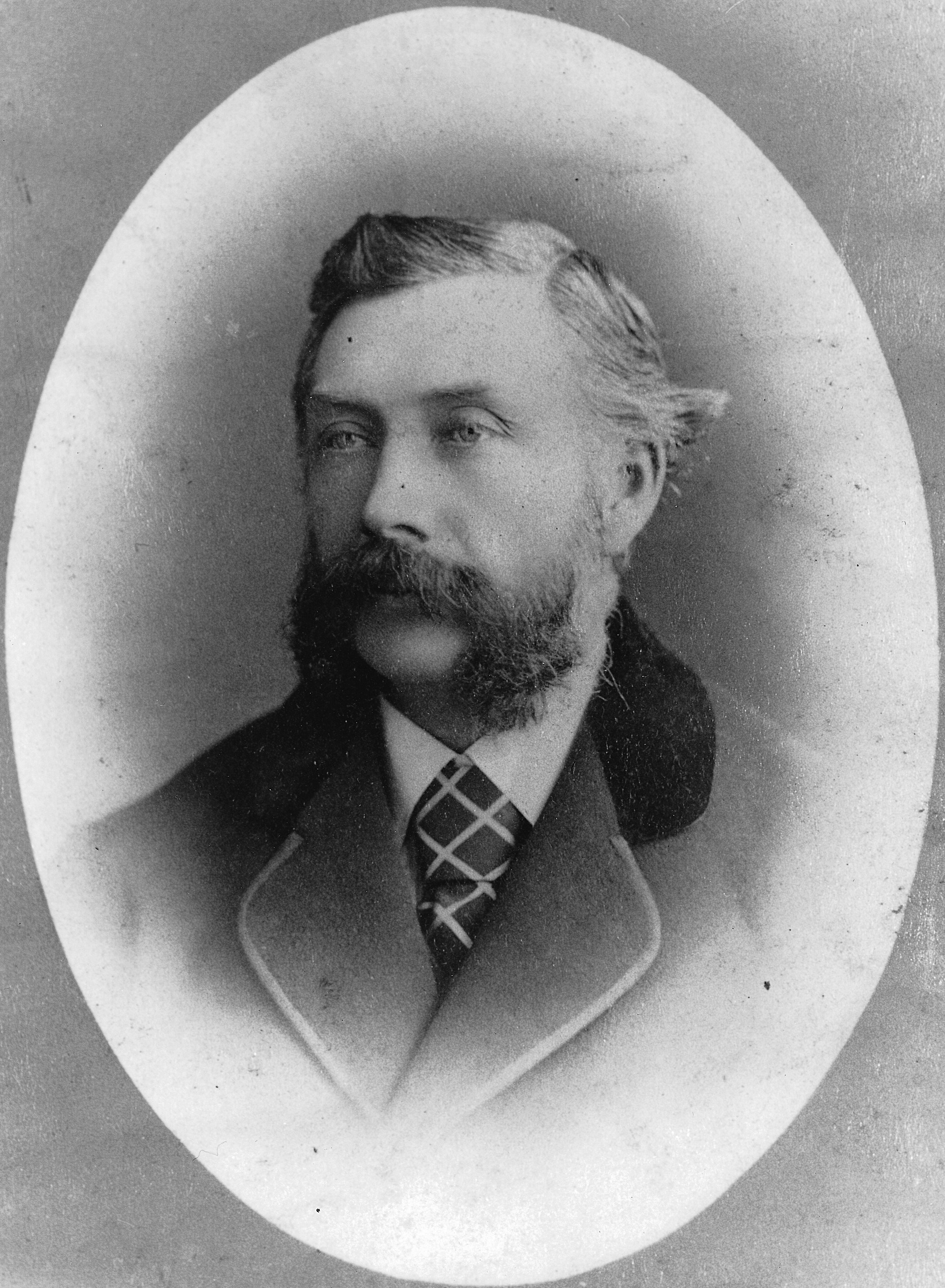
- Born: January 5, 1830; Liverpool, United Kingdom
- Died: August 14, 1896 (aged 66); Montreal, Canada
- Resting place: Mount Royal Cemetery
- Known for: Stained and enamelled glass artist & painter
- Children: At least 4
- Father: William Spence
- Relatives: Benjamin Edward Spence (brother)

John Charles Spence (January 5, 1830 – September 14, 1890) was a Canadian stained-glass artist and painter of British origin.

== Biography ==
Spence was born on January 5, 1830, in Liverpool, United Kingdom. (Note: His birth date, January 5, 1830, is inscribed on a commemorative stained-glass window in his memory at Saint John the Evangelist Church in Montreal.) Around 1849, he opened a glass and stained glass factory at 40 Brownlow Hill in Liverpool. He emigrated to Canada in August 1853 and settled at 21 Notre-Dame Street in Montreal. (Note: Mackay 1859–1870, p. 257 (Montreal Directory), Year 1856–57) From that moment on, he worked for the Ramsay & McArthur firm, making stained and enamel glass. He is already present at the Lower Canada Provincial Exhibition in September 1853, where the company exhibited stained glass windows and furniture adorned with enamelled glass. Also in 1853, he did the glazing for the Notre-Dame-de-Grâce Church in Montreal. On February 21, 1854, he formalized his partnership with the company. (Note: Notorial Act, minute no. 15359, February 21, 1854, A.N.Q.) However, on December 1, 1854, the Ramsay & McArthur partnership was dissolved by mutual consent and Spence consequently cancelled his agreement with this company on January 1, 1855. (Note: Notorial Act, minute no. 16040, January 1, 1855, A.N.Q.) He continued his business on his own account under the company name "Canada Stained Glass Works" and produced between 1855 and 1858 the stained glass windows for the altar of Notre-Dame Basilica in Montreal.

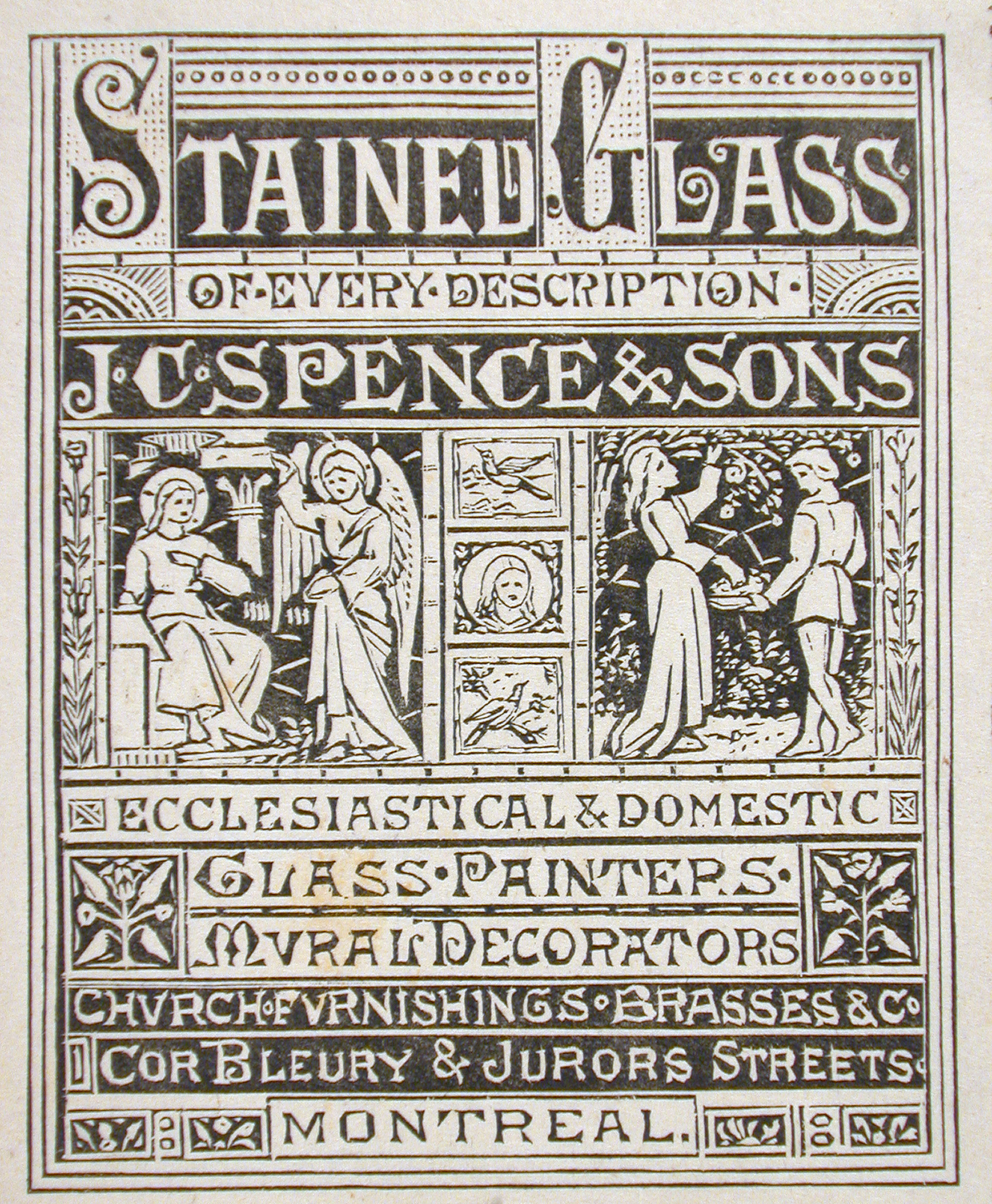
Advertisement for the company J. C. Spence & Sons

Around 1862, Spence ended his partnership with John McArthur and moved his workshop to 52 St. James Street. (Note: Mackay, 1859–1870 & p.203 (Montreal Directory), Year 1861–62) (Note: Mackay, 1859–1870 & p.233 (Montreal Directory), Year 1862–63) Around 1863, he moved his workshop again, this time to De Bleury Street, but in a temporary location while a new three-story brick building was being constructed by architect James Nelson at the intersection of Jurors and Bleury Streets to house his factory. (Note: Mackay, 1859–1870 & p.288 (Montreal Directory), Year 1863–64) Around 1865, Spence moved into his brand-new factory. (Note: Mackay, 1859–1870 & p.283 (Montreal Directory), Year 1865–66)

Spence died in Montreal on September 14, 1890. His funeral was held on September 17, 1890, at Saint John the Evangelist Church. His sons, William and Henry, continued their father's business together until their partnership was dissolved in 1899. Henry John Spence continued the business, still under the names "John C. Spence & Sons" and "Canada Stained Glass Works", with the help of his own son, Frank Spence, until about 1917. (Note: Mackay 1859–1870, p. 1919 (Montreal Directory), Year 1916–17) (Note: Mackay 1859–1870, p. 1934 (Montreal Directory), Year 1917–18) Around 1920, the company became the "Montreal Art Glass Reg."

Around 1894, the new baptistery of Saint John the Evangelist Church in Montreal was built in memory of John C. Spence. However, the stained glass windows were made by the Hardman & Co. company of the United Kingdom.

=== Family ===
John C. Spence is the son of British sculptor William Spence and the brother of sculptor Benjamin Edward Spence.

John C. Spence had at least four children: two sons, William Ramsay and Henry John, and at least two daughters (one residing in New York and the other in the United Kingdom). (Note: Campbell 1886, pp. 142–143)

== Spence and the artists ==
Throughout his career, Spence surrounded himself with artists for the creation of stained and enamelled glass. His presence in Montreal's artistic community allowed him to select talented artists. For example, he served on the management committee of the Mechanics' Institute of Montreal in the 1850s. Around 1854–1855, he also taught "landscape and ornamental drawing" there. From 1884 to 1890, he was a member of the Art Association of Montreal and in 1886 sat on the association's decorative and industrial arts committee. (Note: Art Association 1885, p. 22) (Note: Art Association 1886, p. 36)

Below is a non-exhaustive list of artists who worked in collaboration with or for Spence or his companies:

- Paul Caron, painter and glass colorist (1890s).
- Robert Henders (1880s or 1890s).
- Arthur Alfred Mackey (1880s).
- William Ramsay Spence, son of John C. Spence (did works at least since 1884). (Note: William Ramsay Spence dies on July 26, 1946 in Montreal.)
- Henry John Spence, son of John C. Spence (did works at least since 1886). (Note: Henry John Spence dies on June 10, 1930 in Montreal.)

== Exhibitions and awards ==
Below is a non-exhaustive list of exhibitions in which James Thomson's company has exhibited works:

Year	Exhibition	Date	Location	Works on display and awards (if applicable)
1853	Provincial Exhibition of Lower Canada (Industrial Department)	September 27–30, 1853	Montreal (McTavish Land)	Bedroom set with enameled glass panels painted with landscapes, fruit, and other decorations: Commended and Special Prize.; Table decorated with enameled glass : Commended and Special Prize.; Stained glass windows.
1854	Provincial Exhibition of Lower Canada (Industrial Department)	September 12–15, 1854	Quebec City (Land bordering Saint-Louis Street)	Stained-glass window illustrating The Virgin and Child.; Stained-glass window illustrating The Burial of Christ.; Stained-glass window illustrating the coat of arms of the United Kingdom.; Stained-glass window illustrating a "Medieval design".
1855	Exposition universelle of Paris	May 15 – November 15, 1855	Paris, France	No. 300 : colored stained-glass windows : (Note: Hector Bossange et Fils 1855, p. 67); Three stained-glass windows depicting the coats of arms of England, France and Turkey.; Stained glass window for the chancel of the Protestant church in Durham in Ontario.; No. 326 : Painted and gilded enamelled glass side table. (Note: Hector Bossange et Fils 1855, p. 80); Sketches of stained glass windows, including some intended for the Notre-Dame Basilica in Montreal.
1855	Exhibition	May 1855	Montreal (Mechanics' Institute)	Stained-glass windows.
1855	Provincial Exhibition of Lower Canada (Industrial Department)	September 12–14, 1855	Sherbrooke	Stained-glass windows : 1st prize.
1855	Provincial Exhibition of Upper Canada	October 9–12, 1855	Cobourg	Stained-glass windows.
1856	Provincial Exhibition of Upper Canada	September 23–26, 1856	Kingston, Ontario	Stained-glass windows.
1857	Provincial Exhibition of Lower Canada (Industrial Department)	September 16–18, 1857	Montreal	Stained-glass windows, diploma
1858	Provincial Exhibition of Lower Canada (Industrial Department)	September 29 – October 1, 1858	Montreal (Land belonging to the Grand Trunk Railway Company, in Pointe-Saint-Charles)	Stained-glass window, diploma.; Colored glass, diploma.
1860	Provincial Exhibition of Lower Canada (Industrial Department)	August 25 – September 8, 1860	Montreal (Crystal Palace)	Stained-glass windows, silver medal.
1863	Provincial Exhibition of Lower Canada (Industrial Department)	September 15–17, 1863	Montreal (Crystal Palace)	Colored glass, 1st prize.
1865	Provincial Exhibition of Lower Canada (Industrial Department)	September 26–29, 1865	Montreal (Crystal Palace)	Stained-glass windows, 1st prize.; Colored glass.
1867	Exposition Universelle (1867)	April 1 – November 3, 1867	Paris, France	Stained-glass windows, mention
1876	Centennial Exposition	May 10 – November 10, 1876	Philadelphia	Stained-glass window (30 feet high and 12 feet wide) depicting three subjects : Parable of the Good Samaritan, Parable of the Budding Fig Tree et Presentation of Jesus. Silver medal.
1880	Dominion Exhibition (Industrial Department)	September 14–24, 1880	Montreal (Crystal Palace)	Stained-glass window, 1st prize
1881	Provincial Exhibition of Quebec (Industrial Department)	September 14–24, 1881	Montreal (Crystal Palace)	Assortment of patterned stained glass windows.; Stained glass window for the residence of L. J. Seargeant, "Weredale".; Drawing of a stained-glass window, 1st prize.
1882	Provincial Exhibition of Quebec (Industrial Department)	September 14–23, 1882	Montreal	Stained-glass window.; Drawing of a stained-glass window, 1st prize.
1883	Lecture on the history of stained and painted glass, by lecturer Dr. Canon Norman.	February 4, 1883	Montreal (Art Gallery of the 'Art Association of Montreal)	Samples of painted glass and stained glass mounted on a screen, by John C. Spence.
1883	Dominion Exhibition (Industrial Department)	October 1–10, 1883	Saint John, New Brunswick	Stained-glass windows. First prize.
1884	Dominion Exhibition (Industrial Department)	5 au 13 septembre 1884	Montreal	Assortment of painted and leaded glass panels, 1st prize.; Assortment of stained glass windows, 2nd prize et diploma.; Drawing of a stained-glass window by W. R. Spence, 1st prize.
1885	Annual Spring Exhibition of Works by Canadian Artists	April 1885	Montreal (Art Gallery of the Art Association of Montreal)	Memorial stained-glass window depicting Cleansing of the Temple. (Note: Art Association 1885, p. 18)
1886	Colonial and Indian Exhibition	May 4 – October 15, 1886	South Kensington, United Kingdom	Stained glass window depicting General Montcalm, explorer Jacques Cartier, and Samuel de Champlain, surrounded by maple leaves, below which are toboggans, tomahawks, or tobacco pipes.; Stained glass window depicting a mosaic of birds or leaves.
1893	Art Gallery Exhibition	March–April, 1893	Montreal (Art Gallery of the 'Art Association of Montreal)	Stained glass windows intended for the World's Fair (see description below).
1893	World's Columbian Exposition	May 1 – October 30, 1893	Chicago	Stained glass window depicting two figures representing Peace and Abundance : "Beneath a small cherub-like figure representing the "Angel of Peace," is a female figure sitting upon a cannon : at her feet are books, a broken sword, cannon balls, etc. There is a back ground of mountains overhanging a lake in which are sailing vessels loaded with merchandise. At the right of the figure are doves : emblematical of Peace. A second female figure representing "Plenty." In her right hand are ears of wheat : in her left a cornucopia. The background is a field of grain with reapers at work. Running about the margin of the glass is a border of ears of corn interwoven with olive branches. [...] The dress of the figure "Peace" is blue; that of "Plenty" is ruby, mixed with white and olive green."; Stained glass window depicting the Savior blessing children.
1894	Exhibition of architectural drawings	October 1894 (Conference about the exhibition on October 4, 1894)	Montreal (Art Gallery of the 'Art Association of Montreal)	Drawing of a commemorative stained-glass window intended for Trinity Church, New Orleans, Louisiana.
1897	Lecture on the history of stained and painted glass, by lecturer Dr. Canon Norman.	February 4, 1897	Montreal (Art Gallery of the 'Art Association of Montreal)	Sained-glass windows.; Colored glass.

== List of works ==
=== John C. Spence (1853–1884) ===
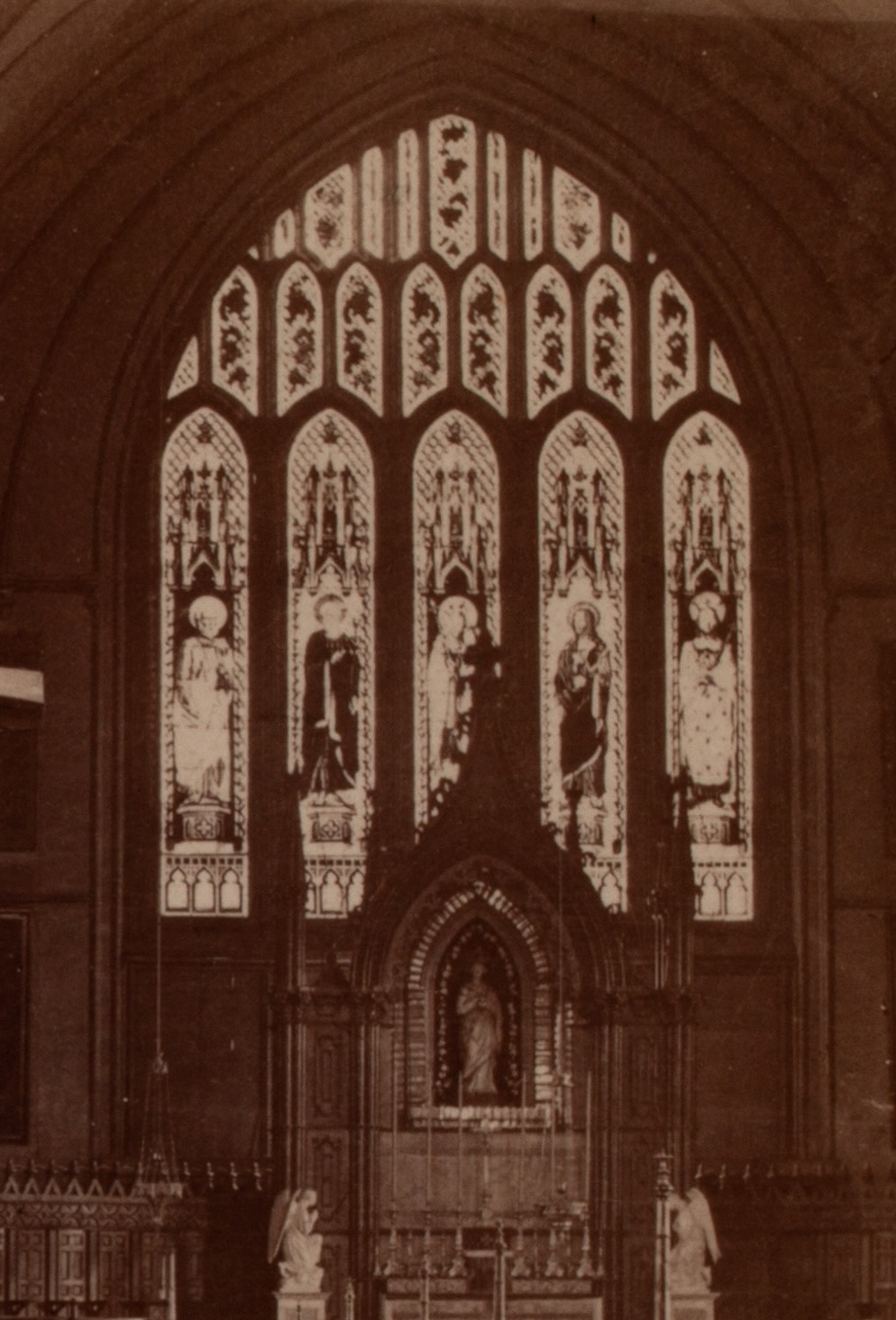
Stained glass windows of the altar of Notre-Dame Church in Montreal, made by John C. Spence between 1855 and 1858.

Below is a non-exhaustive list of John C. Spence's known achievements, including those while he was employed or partner at Ramsay & McArthur (1853–1855) or McArthur & Spence (1860–1862):

- Circa 1853: glazing of Notre-Dame-de-Grâce Church, Montreal, Quebec.
- Circa 1855: Stained glass windows in St. James Anglican Church, Ormstown, Quebec.
- 1850s (?): Stained glass windows in St. Mark's Anglican Church, Longueuil, Quebec.
- December 22, 1855: John C. Spence decorated the reception hall for a banquet organized by the New England Society of Montreal at the Ottawa Hotel in Montreal to commemorate the arrival of the Pilgrim Fathers in 1620.
- Between 1855 and 1858: Stained glass windows in the altar of Notre-Dame Church, Montreal, Quebec.
- Between 1857 and 1862: stained glass windows for Saint-Georges Church (Saint-Georges, Quebec).
- Circa 1857: commemorative stained glass window in memory of George Hamilton for a church in Hawkesbury, Ontario.
- Circa 1857: stained glass lamps for a fire engine destined for Station No. 2 of the Cataract Fire Company in Hamilton, Ontario.
- Circa 1857: stained glass windows for Saint-Jacques Cathedral in Montreal, Quebec.
- Circa 1859: stained glass windows for Christ Church Cathedral in Montreal, Quebec.
- Circa 1860: stained glass windows for the residence of the Honourable John Rose, known as "Montrose," which was used as a temporary residence for Prince Albert Edward in Montreal.
- Circa 1862: stained glass windows for the First Baptist Church (corner of De la Gauchetière and Beaver Hall Streets, Montreal, Quebec).
- Circa 1863: Two stained-glass windows in the Church of the Ascension, Hamilton, Ontario.
- Circa 1864: Painted decorations and stained-glass windows in St. Luke's Episcopal Church (corner of Dorchester and Saint Hubert Streets, Montreal, Quebec).
- Circa 1865: Stained-glass windows on the Inland Steam Navigation Company's steamboat "Spartan".
- Between 1865 and 1867: Stained-glass windows in Trinity Anglican Church (corner of St-Denis and Viger Streets, Montreal).
- Circa 1865: Stained-glass windows in Knox Presbyterian Church (corner of Dorchester and Mansfield Streets, Montreal, Quebec).
- Circa 1865: Stained-glass windows in Erskine Church (corner of Sainte-Catherine and Peel Streets, Montreal, Quebec).
- Circa 1865: Stained-glass windows in the American Church (intersection of Dorchester and Drummond Streets, Montreal, Quebec).
- Circa 1866: stained glass windows for the Richelieu Company steamboat "Quebec".
- Circa 1866: stained glass windows for St. James Anglican Church, Saint-Jean-sur-Richelieu, Quebec.
- Circa 1867: stained glass and painted windows for two urban dwelling houses on University Street, Montreal.
- Circa 1867: stained glass windows for St. Paul's Church (intersection of Dorchester and Sainte-Monique Streets, Montreal).;
- Circa 1867: stained glass windows for St. Stephen's Anglican Church in Chambly, Quebec.
- Circa 1867: stained glass windows for the Michael Farmer House (McCord Street, Montreal, Quebec).
- Between 1867 and 1874: stained glass windows for St. Ninian's Cathedral, Antigonish, Nova Scotia.
- After 1868: Stained glass windows of St. Jax Church (or St. James the Apostle Church), Montreal.
- Circa 1869: Stained glass windows of St. George's Church, Montreal.
- Circa 1869: Stained glass windows of the Methodist Church in Stanstead, Quebec.
- Circa 1872: Stained glass windows of an Anglican church in Ely County, Quebec.
- Circa 1873: A commemorative stained glass window in memory of Archibald Campbell installed in Christ Church Cathedral, Montreal, Quebec.
- Circa 1875: Stained glass windows of Fifth Avenue Presbyterian Church, New York.
- Circa 1875: Stained glass windows of St. Bartholomew's Church, Saint-Raymond, Quebec.
- Circa 1876: Stained glass windows of St. Stephen's Church, Lachine, Quebec, including one in memory of his brother, Benjamin Edward Spence.
- After 1877: Stained glass windows of St. Luke's Church in Waterloo, Quebec.
- Circa 1878: Stained glass windows of Centenary Methodist Church in Saint John, New Brunswick.
- Circa 1878: Stained glass windows of St. Andrew's Presbyterian Church in Saint John, New Brunswick.
- Circa 1878: Stained glass windows of Redeemer Anglican Church in the Côte-Saint-Paul district of Montreal, Quebec.
- Circa 1878: Stained glass windows of Knox Presbyterian Church (corner of Crescent and Dorchester Streets, Montreal, Quebec).
- Circa 1878: Painted decorations and stained glass windows of Olivet Baptist Church (corner of Osborne and De la Montagne Streets, Montreal, Quebec).
- Circa 1879: Stained glass windows of St. Jude's Anglican Church in the Little Burgundy district of Montreal, Quebec.
- Circa 1880 : Stained glass windows for Trinity Church in Saint John, New Brunswick.
- Circa 1881: Commemorative stained-glass window in memory of Bishop O'Brien installed in St. Francis Xavier Catholic Church, Brockville, Ontario.
- Circa 1881: Stained-glass window installed at "Weredale," the residence of L. J. Seargeant, then president of the Grand Trunk Railway Company. The residence was located at the intersection of Dorchester and Atwater Streets, Westmount, Quebec.
- Circa 1882: Stained-glass windows in the église de l'Ange-Gardien (Church of the Guardian Angel) in Rouville, Quebec.
- Circa 1882: Stained-glass windows in the Anglican Church of the Ascension, Inverness, Quebec.
- Circa 1882: stained glass windows for the Presbyterian Church in Valleyfield (since 1984: Emmanuel de Pentecôte Church), including a commemorative window in memory of Alexander and Cornelia Anderson, Salaberry-de-Valleyfield, Quebec.
- Between 1882 and 1884: stained glass windows for the église de la Purification-de-la-Bienheureuse-Vierge-Marie (Church of the Purification of the Blessed Virgin Mary), Repentigny, Quebec.
- Circa 1883: assembly and installation of the stained glass windows for the George Stephen House, Montreal, Quebec.
- Around 1884: stained glass windows for St. Stephen's Anglican Church (corner of Dorchester and Atwater Streets, Westmount, Quebec).

=== John C. Spence & Sons (1884–1917) ===
The company John C. Spence & Sons, founded by John C. Spence and his sons, William and Henry, was not limited to stained glass production but also offered a full range of interior decoration services, particularly for churches. They could therefore create wall decorations, install decorative tiles, brasswork, or even church furniture. Below is a non-exhaustive list of the company's known projects:

- Circa 1884: Commemorative stained-glass window in memory of Louisa Atkinson, for a church in Rock Ferry, United Kingdom, executed by William Ramsay Spence, son of John C. Spence.
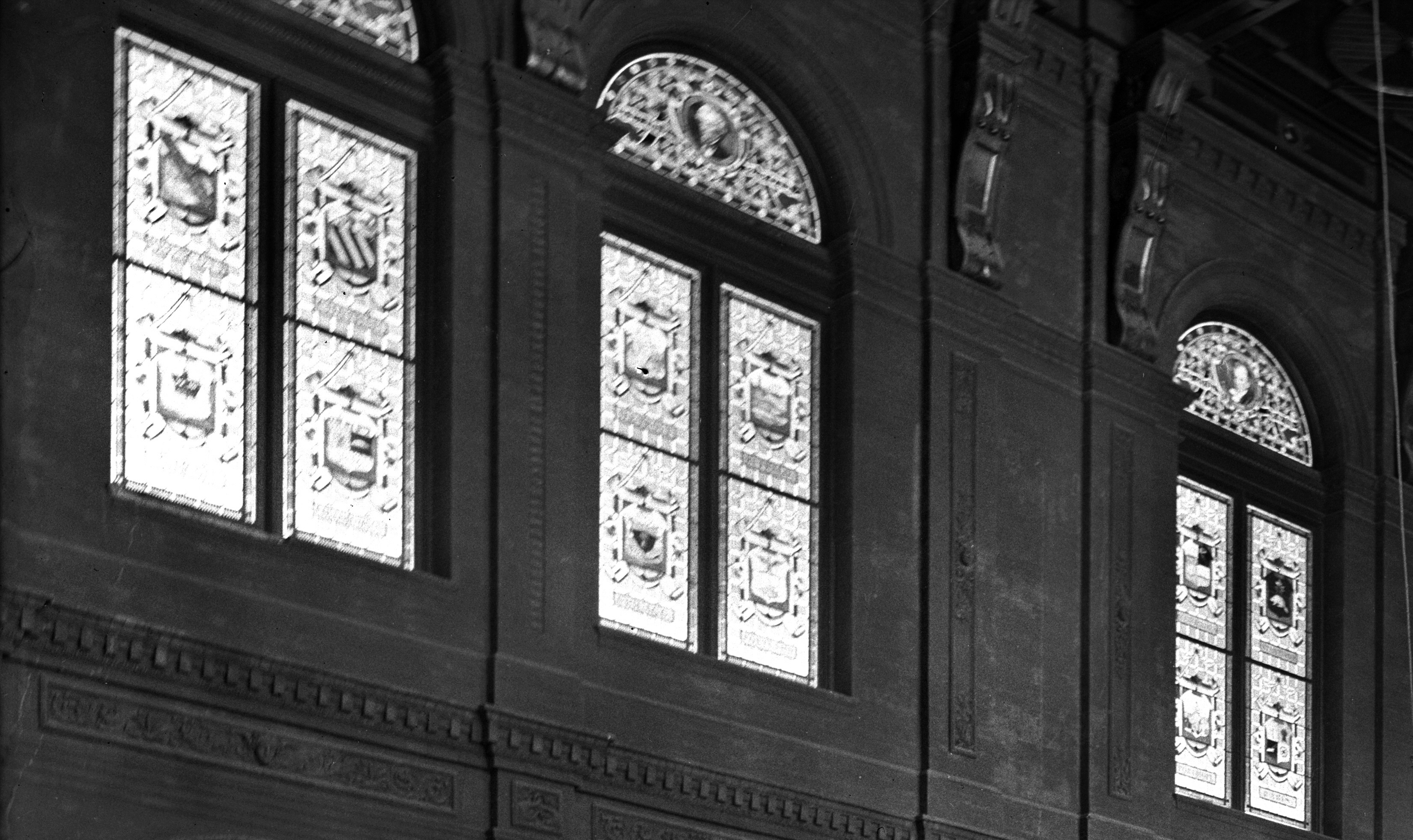
  Stained glass windows manufactured by the John C. Spence & Sons company around 1888 for the waiting room of the Bonaventure train station in Montreal, Quebec, Canada.
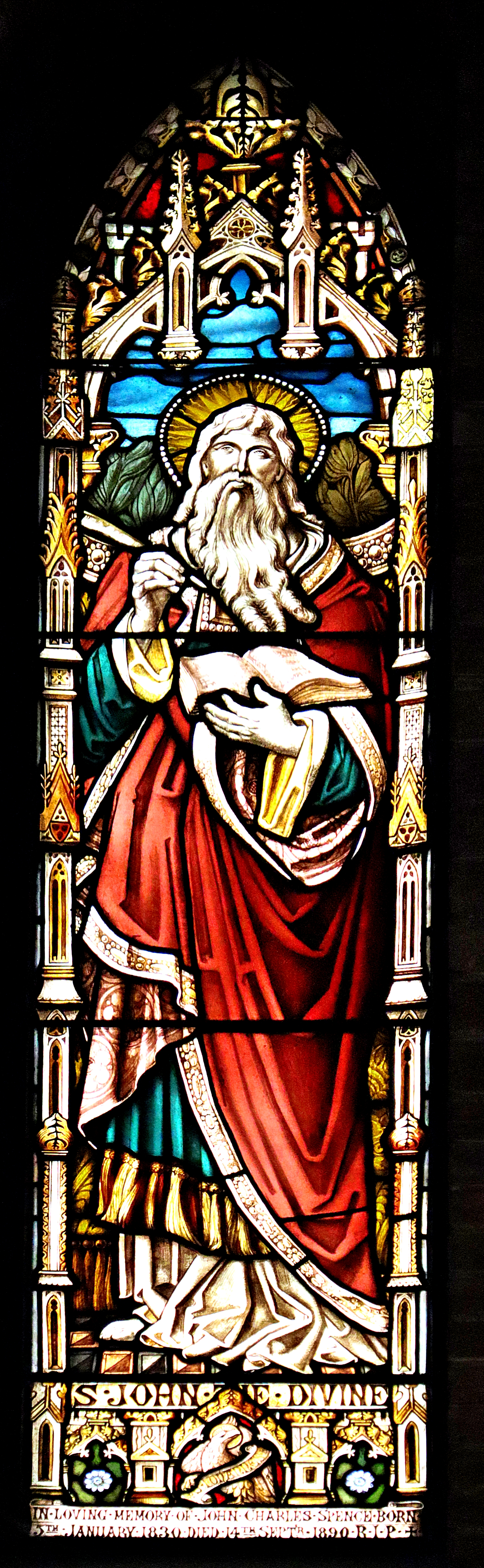
  Memorial window dedicated to John the Apostle in memory of John C. Spence.
- Between 1881 and 1885: Stained-glass windows for Saint-Henri Church in Mascouche, Quebec.
- Circa 1885 : Stained-glass window depicting "The Ascension of Christ" for a church in Bridgetown, Nova Scotia.
- Circa 1886: Stained-glass windows for the Balmoral Hotel, Notre-Dame Street, Montreal, Quebec.
- Circa 1886: Stained-glass windows for St. Paul's Episcopal Cathedral, Fond du Lac, Wisconsin.
- Circa 1886: Stained-glass windows for the Episcopal Church in Saint-Lambert, Montérégie (replaced in 1929 by St. Barnabas Anglican Church in Saint-Lambert), Quebec.
- Circa 1886: Stained-glass windows for the American Presbyterian Church (intersection of Drummond and Dorchester Streets, Montreal, Quebec).
- Circa 1887: Stained glass windows of the Sainte-Anne de Varennes Basilica, Varennes, Quebec.
- Circa 1887: Installation of a commemorative stained glass window in memory of Robert William and Anne Sarah O'Connor, produced by a manufacturer in the United Kingdom, in St. Matthew's Church (since 1979: Saint-Jean-Baptiste Library), Quebec City. (Note: According to the same source, John C.Spence & Sons installed twelve other commemorative stained-glass windows at St. Matthew's Church in Quebec City.)
- Circa 1888: Commemorative stained glass window in memory of Reverend Charles Rollit installed in Christ Church, Rawdon, Quebec.
- Circa 1888: Stained glass windows in the waiting room of Bonaventure Station (1887–1952), Montreal, Quebec.
- Circa 1890: Stained glass windows for Saint James Chapel in Lac-Beauport, Quebec.
- Circa 1892: Stained glass windows for Grace Church, Pointe-Saint-Charles, Montreal, Quebec.
- Circa 1892: Stained glass windows for Saint Paul Anglican Church (Brome Lake).
- Circa 1894: Commemorative stained glass window for Trinity Church, New Orleans, Louisiana.
- Between 1895 and 1897: Stained glass windows for Saint Mark Chapel, Bishop's University, Sherbrooke.
- Circa 1896: Six commemorative stained glass windows for Trinity Church in Muscatine, Iowa.
- Circa 1896: Stained glass window for Knox Presbyterian Church (corner of Dorchester and Mansfield Streets, Montreal, Quebec).
- Circa 1896: A commemorative stained-glass window in memory of Bishop John Medley for a building in Perth-Andover, New Brunswick.
- Circa 1896: A commemorative stained-glass window in memory of Dr. G. E. Fenwick for Church of St. John the Evangelist in Montreal, Quebec.
- Circa 1896: A commemorative stained-glass window for Holy Trinity Anglican Church, Hawkesbury, Ontario.
- Circa 1896: A commemorative stained-glass window in memory of Henry Yates and his son Arthur Raymond Yates for Grace Anglican Church, Brantford, Ontario.
- Circa 1897: A circular stained-glass window for St. George's Cathedral in Kingston, Ontario.
- Circa 1897: A commemorative stained-glass window in memory of Senator Henry Kaulback for an Anglican church in Lunenburg, Nova Scotia.
- Circa 1899: Commemorative stained-glass window in memory of John Martin installed in St. John's Anglican Church in Bury, Quebec.
- Circa 1899: Decorations for a chapel in St. Jax Church (or St. James the Apostle Church), Montreal. (Note: This decoration excludes the execution of the stained glass windows made by the company Castle & Son.)
- Between 1898 and 1900: Stained-glass windows for Christ Church, Saint-André-d'Argenteuil.
- Between 1900 and 1902: Stained-glass windows for St. Peter's Church, Sherbrooke.
- Circa 1905: Stained-glass windows for St. Andrew's Presbyterian Church, Huntingdon, Quebec.

John C. Spence & Sons also produced stained glass windows for these buildings:

- St. Peter's Church, Cookshire-Eaton.
- Saint George's Church, Drummondville.
- Holy Trinity Church (Iron Hill).
- Chapel of Jeffrey Hale - St Brigid's Hospital, Quebec City.

Furthermore, the firm John C. Spence & Sons ordered, adapted and installed stained glass windows in the Montreal residences of Donald Alexander Smith, Richard B. Angus, the Honourable John Abbott, Robert Simms and G. N. Gnaedinger.

== Sources ==
=== Books / works ===
List of publications in chronological order :

- Catalogue de la collection envoyée du Canada à l'exposition universelle de Paris, 1855 et classée d'après le système adopté par la Commission Impériale (in French). Paris, France: Hector Bossange et Fils. 1855. p. 128. CI-1855.
- Catalogue of the annual spring exhibition of works by Canadian artists. Montreal, Canada.: Art Association of Montreal. 1885. p. 21. AA-1885.
- W. S. Mackay, Robert, ed. (1859–1870). The Montreal Directory. Montreal, Quebec: John Lovell. Lovell.
- Campbell, Duke of Argyll, John, ed. (1886). Industries of Canada : City of Montreal, historical and descriptive review, leading firms and moneyed institutions. Montreal, Quebec: issued by the Historical Publishing Company. p. 160. JC-1886.
- Report of the council to the Association. Montreal, Canada.: Art Association of Montreal. 1879–1895. AA-Reports.
- David Russell, Jack, ed. (1913). History of Saint-Andrew's Church, Saint John, N.B. St. John, N.B.: Barnes. JDR-1913.
- Stevens, Gerald, ed. (1957). The Edith Chown Pierce & Gerald Stevens collection of early Canadian glass : presented to the Royal Ontario Museum, Toronto, in memory of Mrs. Lorne Pierce. Toronto, Ontario: Royal Ontario Museum. p. 40. GS-1957.
- Stevens, Gerald, ed. (1979). Early Canadian Glass. Toronto, Ontario: Coles Publishing Company Limited. p. 210. GS-1979.

=== Notorial acts ===
List of notorial acts in chronological order of publication:

- Jones Gibb, Isaac (Notary) (February 21, 1854). Notorial Act en minute, min. no. 15359 : "Ramsay & McArthur: Agreement with John C. Spence". Notaries Records, Judicial District of Montreal: Superior Court Funds, National Archives of Quebec. AN-15359.
- Jones Gibb, Isaac (Notary) (January 1, 1855). Notorial Act en minute, min. no. 16040 : "Ramsay & McArthur: Cancellation of agreement with John C. Spence". Notaries Records, Judicial District of Montreal: Superior Court Funds, National Archives of Quebec. AN-16040.

=== Newspaper Articles ===
List of newspaper articles in chronological order of publication:

- "Ornemental Glass. John C. Spence, Manufacturer". Liverpool Mercury (Newspaper). Vol. 39, no. 2152. Liverpool, UK. December 21, 1849. p. 8.
- "The "Sarah Sands". The R. M. Steamer of the Canadian Line, which left Liverpool on the 21rst ultimo, arrived at Quebec on Friday night last". Montreal Herald and Daily Commercial Gazette (Newspaper). Vol. 45, no. 143 (Robert Weir ed.). Montreal (QC), Canada. August 15, 1853. p. 2.
- "Painted Glass". Montreal Herald and Daily Commercial Gazette (Newspaper). Vol. 45, no. 183 (Robert Weir ed.). Montreal (QC), Canada. September 30, 1853. p. 2.
- "Provincial Exhibition. PART II, Section 7 : Manufactures of Wood, Cabinet Ware, Carriages, etc". Montreal Herald and Daily Commercial Gazette (Newspaper). Vol. 45, no. 192 (Robert Weir ed.). Montreal (QC), Canada. October 11, 1853. p. 1.
- "Stained Glass (Ad by Ramsay & McArthur)". Montreal Herald and Daily Commercial Gazette (Newspaper). Vol. 45, no. 240 (Robert Weir ed.). Montreal (QC), Canada. December 29, 1853. p. 1.
- "James M. Evans, (Late John C. Spence,) Manufacturer of Stained Glass". Cheshire Observer (Newspaper). Vol. 1, no. 18. Chester, Cheshire, England. September 9, 1854. p. 1.
- "The Provincial Exhibition". The Quebec Mercury (Newspaper). Vol. 50, no. 110 (Québec : [s.n.], 1805–1863 ed.). Quebec City (QC), Canada. September 14, 1854. p. 2.
- "Institut des artisans". Le pays (Newspaper) (in French). Vol. 3, no. 124 (Montréal : Le pays, 1852–1871 ed.). Montreal (QC), Canada. November 9, 1854. p. 2.
- "Dissolution of Co-Partnership. Ramsay & McArthur". Montreal Herald and Daily Commercial Gazette (Newspaper). Vol. 46, no. 251 (Robert Weir ed.). Montreal (QC), Canada. December 1, 1854. p. 3.
- "Inauguration of the Industrial Exhibition". Montreal Herald and Daily Commercial Gazette (Newspaper). Vol. 47, no. 56 (Robert Weir ed.). Montreal (QC), Canada. March 7, 1855. p. 2.
- "The Exhibition". Montreal Gazette (Newspaper). Vol. 70, no. 56 (Postmedia Network Inc. ed.). Montreal (QC), Canada. March 7, 1855. p. 2.
- "List of articles selected from the local exhibition in Montreal to be sent to Paris". Montreal Herald and Daily Commercial Gazette (Newspaper). Vol. 47, no. 52 (Robert Weir ed.). Montreal (QC), Canada. March 14, 1855. p. 2.
- "Industrial Exhibition". Montreal Herald and Daily Commercial Gazette (Newspaper). Vol. 47, no. 53 (Robert Weir ed.). Montreal (QC), Canada. March 15, 1855. p. 2.
- "Consecration of St. James' Church, Ormstown". Montreal Herald and Daily Commercial Gazette (Newspaper). Vol. 47, no. 67 (Robert Weir ed.). Montreal (QC), Canada. March 20, 1855. p. 2.
- "Exhibition at the new Mechanics' Institute". Montreal Herald and Daily Commercial Gazette (Newspaper). Vol. 47, no. 121 (Robert Weir ed.). Montreal (QC), Canada. May 24, 1855. p. 2.
- "Upper Canada Provincial Exhibition". Montreal Herald and Daily Commercial Gazette (Newspaper). Vol. 47, no. 244 (Robert Weir ed.). Montreal (QC), Canada. October 15, 1855. p. 2.
- "Institut des artisans". Le pays (Newspaper) (in French). Vol. 4, no. 121 (Montréal : Le pays, 1852–1871 ed.). Montreal (QC), Canada. November 13, 1855. p. 2.
- "Prizes Awarded at the late Lower Canada Provincial Agricultural & Industrial Exhibition". Montreal Herald and Daily Commercial Gazette (Newspaper). Vol. 47, no. 223 (Robert Weir ed.). Montreal (QC), Canada. November 20, 1855. p. 1.
- "New England Society of Montreal". Montreal Herald and Daily Commercial Gazette (Newspaper). Vol. 47, no. 305 (Robert Weir ed.). Montreal (QC), Canada. December 25, 1855. p. 2.
- "Canada Stained and Ornemental Glass Works, No 24, Notre Dame Street, Neat Donegana's Hotel, Montreal (Ad)". The Quebec Mercury (Newspaper). Vol. 52, no. 91 (Québec : [s.n.], 1805–1863 ed.). Quebec City (QC), Canada. August 2, 1856. p. 3.
- "Upper Canada Provincial Exhibition". The Montreal Witness (Newspaper). Vol. 11, no. 40 ([s.n.] ed.). Montreal (QC), Canada. October 1, 1856. p. 5.
- "The Opening of the Grand Trunk Railway. Meeting of the members of the Mechanics' Institute". Montreal Herald and Daily Commercial Gazette (Newspaper). Vol. 48, no. 247 (Robert Weir ed.). Montreal (QC), Canada. October 16, 1856. p. 2.
- "Celebration by the citizens of Montreal of the Grand Trunk Railway, through from Montreal to Stratford". Montreal Herald and Daily Commercial Gazette (Newspaper). Vol. 48, no. 271 (Robert Weir ed.). Montreal (QC), Canada. November 13, 1856. p. 1.
- "St. George's Church & St. James R.C. Church". Montreal Herald and Daily Commercial Gazette (Newspaper). Vol. 49, no. 120 (Robert Weir ed.). Montreal (QC), Canada. May 22, 1857. p. 2.
- "Lower Canada Provincial Agricultural Exhibition". Montreal Herald and Daily Commercial Gazette (Newspaper). Vol. 49, no. 221 (Robert Weir ed.). Montreal (QC), Canada. September 17, 1857. p. 2.
- "The Agricultural and Industrial Exhibition". Montreal Herald and Daily Commercial Gazette (Newspaper). Vol. 49, no. 222 (Robert Weir ed.). Montreal (QC), Canada. September 18, 1857. p. 2.
- "Provincial Exhibition". The Gazette (Newspaper). Vol. 72, no. 238 (Postmedia Network Inc. ed.). Montreal (QC), Canada. October 7, 1857. p. 2.
- "Provincial Exhibition". The Montreal Weekly Gazette (Newspaper). Vol. 73, no. 41. Montreal (QC), Canada. October 10, 1857. p. 2.
- "Stained Glass for Church in Hawkesbury (Ottawa)". Montreal Herald and Daily Commercial Gazette (Newspaper). Vol. 49, no. 244 (Robert Weir ed.). Montreal (QC), Canada. October 14, 1857. p. 1.
- "A New Fire-Engine". Montreal Herald and Daily Commercial Gazette (Newspaper). Vol. 49, no. 260 (Robert Weir ed.). Montreal (QC), Canada. November 2, 1857. p. 1.
- "New Stained Glass Window in the Parish (R.C.) Church". Montreal Herald and Daily Commercial Gazette (Newspaper). Vol. 50, no. 152 (Robert Weir ed.). Montreal (QC), Canada. June 29, 1858. p. 2.
- "Lower Canada Provincial Exhibition". Montreal Herald and Daily Commercial Gazette (Newspaper). Vol. 50, no. 232 (Robert Weir ed.). Montreal (QC), Canada. September 30, 1858. p. 2.
- "Provincial Exhibition". The Gazette (Newspaper). Vol. 73, no. 252 (Postmedia Network Inc. ed.). Montreal (QC), Canada. September 30, 1858. p. 2.
- "Prize List of the Industrial Department of the Lower Canada Provincial Exhibition held in Montreal". Montreal Herald and Daily Commercial Gazette (Newspaper). Vol. 50, no. 233 (Robert Weir ed.). Montreal (QC), Canada. October 1, 1858. p. 1.
- "Prize List for the Thirteenth Annual Exhibition of the Montreal Horticultural Society, to be held at Montreal, on the 14th and 15th days of September, 1859". Montreal Herald and Daily Commercial Gazette (Newspaper). Vol. 51, no. 211 (Robert Weir ed.). Montreal (QC), Canada. September 17, 1859. p. 2.
- "Christ Church". Montreal Herald and Daily Commercial Gazette (Newspaper). Vol. 51, no. 262 (Robert Weir ed.). Montreal (QC), Canada. November 3, 1859. p. 1.
- "To Let, in Notre-Dame Street, Two Shops and dewllings, one of them occupied by Mr Spence as Glass Works [...]". Montreal Herald and Daily Commercial Gazette (Newspaper). Vol. 52, no. 36 (Robert Weir ed.). Montreal (QC), Canada. February 11, 1860. p. 2.
- "Greenhouses. Mr. Torrance's Conservatory". Montreal Herald and Daily Commercial Gazette (Newspaper). Vol. 52, no. 41 (Robert Weir ed.). Montreal (QC), Canada. February 17, 1860. p. 2.
- "Co-Partnership Notice. McArthur & Spence". Montreal Herald and Daily Commercial Gazette (Newspaper). Vol. 52, no. 115 (Robert Weir ed.). Montreal (QC), Canada. May 14, 1860. p. 2.
- "M'Arthur & Spence. Importers and Dealers in Paints, Oils, Glass, Varnishes, ... House, Sign & Decorative Painters". Montreal Herald and Daily Commercial Gazette (Newspaper). Vol. 52, no. 115 (Robert Weir ed.). Montreal (QC), Canada. May 14, 1860. p. 2.
- "M'Arthur & Spence, Importateurs et Marchands". L'Ordre: union catholique (Newspaper) (in French). Vol. 2, no. 60 (Plinguet & Laplante ed.). Montreal (QC), Canada. May 16, 1860. p. 2.
- "Visit of the The Prince of Wales to Montreal. Montreal Residence of the Prince". Montreal Herald and Daily Commercial Gazette (Newspaper). Vol. 52, no. 204 (Robert Weir ed.). Montreal (QC), Canada. August 25, 1860. p. 2.
- "Provincial Exhibition. Board of Arts - Prize List - (Continued) -- Class VII". The Daily Witness (Newspaper). Vol. 1, no. 51 (John Dougall ed.). Montreal (QC), Canada. October 12, 1860. p. 2.
- "First Baptist Church, Montreal". The Daily Witness (Newspaper). Vol. 3, no. 24 (John Dougall ed.). Montreal (QC), Canada. January 29, 1862. p. 2.
- "Progress in Montreal. Under the Superintendence of A. B. Taft, Architect. Beaver Hall Hill. First Baptist Church". Montreal Herald and Daily Commercial Gazette (Newspaper). Vol. 54, no. 47 (Robert Weir ed.). Montreal (QC), Canada. February 24, 1862. p. 7.
- "Fine Arts". Montreal Herald and Daily Commercial Gazette (Newspaper). Vol. 54, no. 190 (Robert Weir ed.). Montreal (QC), Canada. August 9, 1862. p. 2.
- "Canadian News. Church of Ascension (John Street)". The Montreal Witness (Newspaper). Vol. 18, no. 69 ([n/a] ed.). Montreal (QC), Canada. August 29, 1863. p. 3.
- "Provincial Exhibition". Montreal Herald and Daily Commercial Gazette (Newspaper). Vol. 55, no. 221 (Robert Weir ed.). Montreal (QC), Canada. September 16, 1863. p. 2.
- "L'Exposition Provinciale". La Minerve (Newspaper) (in French). Vol. 36, no. 4 (Augustin-Norbert Morin ed.). Montreal (QC), Canada. May 16, 1860. p. 2.
- "Provincial Exhibition. Industrial Department Prize List". Montreal Herald and Daily Commercial Gazette (Newspaper). Vol. 55, no. 227 (Robert Weir ed.). Montreal (QC), Canada. September 23, 1863. p. 1.
- "Exposition Provinciale. Liste des prix (Département Industriel, 2e classe, Section A)". Le pays (Newspaper) (in French). Vol. 12, no. 105 (Montréal : Le pays, 1852–1871 ed.). Montreal (QC), Canada. September 29, 1863. p. 1.
- "St. Luke's Church, Dorchester Street East". Montreal Herald and Daily Commercial Gazette (Newspaper). Vol. 56, no. 21 (Robert Weir ed.). Montreal (QC), Canada. January 26, 1864. p. 2.
- "New Steamer". Montreal Herald and Daily Commercial Gazette (Newspaper). Vol. 57, no. 117 (Robert Weir ed.). Montreal (QC), Canada. May 18, 1865. p. 1.
- "Trinity Church". Montreal Herald and Daily Commercial Gazette (Newspaper). Vol. 57, no. 223 (Robert Weir ed.). Montreal (QC), Canada. September 19, 1865. p. 2.
- "Provincial Industrial, Horticultural and Agricultural Exhibition, 1865". Montreal Herald and Daily Commercial Gazette (Newspaper). Vol. 57, no. 230 (Robert Weir ed.). Montreal (QC), Canada. September 27, 1865. p. 1.
- "L'Exposition. Département industriel et artistique". Gazette de Sorel (Newspaper) (in French). Vol. 9, no. 8 (Sorel: [Gazette de Sorel], 1857–1900 ed.). Montreal (QC), Canada. September 30, 1865. p. 1.
- "Opening of Knox's Church". Montreal Herald and Daily Commercial Gazette (Newspaper). Vol. 57, no. 289 (Robert Weir ed.). Montreal (QC), Canada. December 5, 1865. p. 2.
- "Erskine Church, St. Catherine Street". Montreal Herald and Daily Commercial Gazette (Newspaper). Vol. 57, no. 289 (Robert Weir ed.). Montreal (QC), Canada. December 19, 1865. p. 1.
- "Fire". Montreal Herald and Daily Commercial Gazette (Newspaper). Vol. 58, no. 87 (Robert Weir ed.). Montreal (QC), Canada. April 12, 1866. p. 1.
- "Steamer Quebec". Montreal Herald and Daily Commercial Gazette (Newspaper). Vol. 58, no. 97 (Robert Weir ed.). Montreal (QC), Canada. April 26, 1866. p. 1.
- "The Anglican Church at St. John's C.E." The Quebec Daily Mercury (Newspaper). Vol. 61, no. 96 (Josiah Blackburn, 1863–1875 ed.). Quebec City (QC), Canada. April 28, 1866. p. 2.
- "Steamer Quebec". The Quebec Daily Mercury (Newspaper). Vol. 61, no. 97 (Josiah Blackburn, 1863–1875 ed.). Quebec City (QC), Canada. April 30, 1866. p. 2.
- "City Items. Trinity Church Chancel". The Daily Witness (Newspaper). Vol. 7, no. 279 (John Dougall ed.). Montreal (QC), Canada. November 24, 1866. p. 2.
- "Death of a Sculptor : Mr. E. B. Spence". The Daily Witness (Newspaper). Vol. 7, no. 289 (John Dougall ed.). Montreal (QC), Canada. December 6, 1866. p. 2.
- "John C. Spence, Glass Stainer". The Daily Witness (Newspaper). Vol. 8, no. 37 (John Dougall ed.). Montreal (QC), Canada. February 13, 1867. p. 1.
- "Progress of Montreal (Illustrated Edition)". Montreal Herald and Daily Commercial Gazette (Newspaper). Vol. 59, no. (DOUBLE SHEET) (Robert Weir ed.). Montreal (QC), Canada. March 1, 1867. p. 1.
- "Laying of the Corner Stone of the New St. Paul's Church, Dorchester Street". The Gazette (Newspaper). Vol. 93, no. 137 (Postmedia Network Inc. ed.). Montreal (QC), Canada. June 10, 1867. p. 2.
- "Liste des récompenses décernées par le Jury international de l'Exposition Universelle de Paris aux Exposants Canadiens". La Minerve (Newspaper) (in French). Vol. 39, no. 258 (Augustin-Norbert Morin ed.). Montreal (QC), Canada. July 17, 1867. p. 2.
- "L'Exposition Universelle. Liste des récompenses décernées par le Jury international de l'Exposition Universelle de Paris aux Exposants Canadiens". L'Ordre: union catholique (Newspaper) (in French). Vol. 9, no. 95 (Plinguet & Laplante ed.). Montreal (QC), Canada. July 19, 1867. p. 2.
- "Stained-glass window, St. Stephen's Church at Chambly". The Daily Witness (Newspaper). Vol. 8, no. 266 (John Dougall ed.). Montreal (QC), Canada. November 9, 1867. p. 2.
- "Progress of Montreal. McCord Street". Montreal Herald and Daily Commercial Gazette (Newspaper). Vol. 59, no. 292 (Robert Weir ed.). Montreal (QC), Canada. December 7, 1867. p. 2.
- "Exposition Provinciale". La Minerve (Newspaper) (in French). Vol. 41, no. 7 (Augustin-Norbert Morin ed.). Montreal (QC), Canada. September 16, 1868. p. 2.
- "Laying of the Corner-stone of St. George's Church". Montreal Herald and Daily Commercial Gazette (Newspaper). Vol. 61, no. 116 (Robert Weir ed.). Montreal (QC), Canada. May 17, 1869. p. 2.
- "The New Methodist Church at Stanstead". The Daily Witness (Newspaper). Vol. 10, no. 280 (John Dougall ed.). Montreal (QC), Canada. September 29, 1869. p. 2.
- "Church Dedication : The New Methodist Church at Stanstead, P.Q.". The Quebec Gazette (Newspaper). Vol. 107, no. 10529. Quebec City (QC), Canada. October 1, 1869. p. 2.

"The Glass Warehouse". The Montreal Witness (Newspaper). Vol. 26, no. 87 ([n/a] ed.). Montreal (QC), Canada. October 27, 1869. p. 4.

- "Grace Church. Laying of the Foundation Stone". The Gazette (Newspaper). Vol. 99, no. 259 (Postmedia Network Inc. ed.). Montreal (QC), Canada. November 1, 1870. p. 2.
- "Opinions of the People". Morning chronicle and commercial and shipping gazette (Newspaper). Vol. 21, no. 9929 (Charles St. Michel, 1850–1888 ed.). Montreal (QC), Canada. January 5, 1872. p. 2.
- "Anglican Cathedral". Morning chronicle and commercial and shipping gazette (Newspaper). Vol. 27, no. 10399 (Charles St. Michel, 1850–1888 ed.). Montreal (QC), Canada. July 5, 1873. p. 2.
- "Centennial Exhibition. List of Entries". The Quebec Daily Mercury (Newspaper). Vol. 71, no. 277 (Josiah Blackburn, 1863–1875 ed.). Quebec City (QC), Canada. November 25, 1875. p. 2.
- "Centennial Stained Glass". The Gazette (Newspaper). Vol. 105, no. 84 (Postmedia Network Inc. ed.). Montreal (QC), Canada. April 7, 1876. p. 4.
- "Brieflets. Stained Glass Window in Lachine Church". The Evening Star (Newspaper). Vol. 8, no. 176 ([The evening star], 1869–1877 ed.). Montreal (QC), Canada. July 27, 1876. p. 2.
- "International Exhibition". The Evening Star (Newspaper). Vol. 8, no. 233 ([The evening star], 1869–1877 ed.). Montreal (QC), Canada. October 2, 1876. p. 2.
- "An Interesting Ceremony. Laying the Foundation of Crescent Street Presbyterian Church". The Star (Newspaper). Vol. 9, no. 106 ([s.n.], 1877–1880 ed.). Montreal (QC), Canada. May 5, 1877. p. 3.
- "New Mission Church". The Star (Newspaper). Vol. 10, no. 11 ([s.n.], 1877–1880 ed.). Montreal (QC), Canada. January 14, 1878. p. 1.
- "Church Extension in Montreal. Another Edifice to be Dedicated to the Worship of God - Crescent Street Presbyterian Church Ready for Opening". The Montreal Star (Newspaper). Vol. 10, no. 58 (George T. Lanigan; Hugh Graham. ed.). Montreal (QC), Canada. March 9, 1878. p. 3.
- "Olivet Baptist Church". The Daily Witness (Newspaper). Vol. 17, no. 97 (John Dougall ed.). Montreal (QC), Canada. April 25, 1878. p. 1.
- "Olivet Baptist Church". Montreal Herald and Daily Commercial Gazette (Newspaper). Vol. 70, no. 99 (Robert Weir ed.). Montreal (QC), Canada. April 26, 1878. p. 2.
- "Church of St. John The Evangelist. The Church Edifice". The Montreal Star (Newspaper). Vol. 10, no. 141 (George T. Lanigan; Hugh Graham. ed.). Montreal (QC), Canada. June 17, 1878. p. 3.
- "Olivet Baptist Church. The Dedication Yesterday". Montreal Herald and Daily Commercial Gazette (Newspaper). Vol. 71, no. 70 (Robert Weir ed.). Montreal (QC), Canada. March 24, 1879. p. 4.
- "St. Jude's Anglican Church". Montreal Herald and Daily Commercial Gazette (Newspaper). Vol. 71, no. 85 (Robert Weir ed.). Montreal (QC), Canada. April 10, 1879. p. 4.
- "Exports. Per SS POLINO, John Delisle, master, for Syndney, C.B." Montreal Herald and Daily Commercial Gazette (Newspaper). Vol. 71, no. 241 (Robert Weir ed.). Montreal (QC), Canada. October 9, 1879. p. 1.
- "Provincial Exhibition. Prize List". Montreal Herald and Daily Commercial Gazette (Newspaper). Vol. 72, no. 226 (Robert Weir ed.). Montreal (QC), Canada. September 21, 1880. p. 8.
- "Dominion Exhibition". Montreal Herald and Daily Commercial Gazette (Newspaper). Vol. 72, no. 228 (Robert Weir ed.). Montreal (QC), Canada. September 23, 1880. p. 8.
- "New Trinity". Telegraph Journal (Newspaper). Vol. 12, no. 136. St. John (N.B.), Canada. December 2, 1880. p. 2.
- "City Items. (Brockville Catholic Church)". The Daily Witness (Newspaper). Vol. 20, no. 76 (John Dougall ed.). Montreal (QC), Canada. April 12, 1881. p. 8.
- "In memory of Bishop O'Brien". The Montreal Star (Newspaper). Vol. 13, no. 86 (George T. Lanigan; Hugh Graham. ed.). Montreal (QC), Canada. April 12, 1881. p. 3.
- "The Exhibition". Montreal Herald and Daily Commercial Gazette (Newspaper). Vol. 73, no. 225 (Robert Weir ed.). Montreal (QC), Canada. September 20, 1881. p. 7.
- "The Exhibition". The Montreal Daily Star (Newspaper). Vol. 13, no. 222 ([Montreal daily star], 1881–1951 ed.). Montreal (QC), Canada. September 21, 1881. p. 4.
- "The Exhibition. Prize List". The Montreal Daily Star (Newspaper). Vol. 13, no. 223 ([Montreal daily star], 1881–1951 ed.). Montreal (QC), Canada. September 23, 1881. p. 3.
- "The Provincial Exhibition. The Industrial Prize List". Montreal Herald and Daily Commercial Gazette (Newspaper). Vol. 73, no. 229 (Robert Weir ed.). Montreal (QC), Canada. September 24, 1881. p. 8.
- "From Megantic. Church of the Ascension in Inverness". Morning chronicle and commercial and shipping gazette (Newspaper). Vol. 36, no. 13172 (Charles St. Michel, 1850–1888 ed.). Montreal (QC), Canada. June 24, 1882. p. 2.
- "Opening of Valleyfield Presbyterian Church". The Canadian Gleaner (Newspaper). Vol. 19, no. 863 (Huntingdon : [Canadian gleaner], 1863–1912 ed.). Huntingdon (QC), Canada. July 13, 1882. p. 2.
- "The Exhibition". The Daily Witness (Newspaper). Vol. 21, no. 216 (John Dougall ed.). Montreal (QC), Canada. September 15, 1882. p. 8.
- "The Exhibition. A notice of the Exhibition in the Main Building". The Montreal Daily Star (Newspaper). Vol. 14, no. 220 ([Montreal daily star], 1881–1951 ed.). Montreal (QC), Canada. September 19, 1882. p. 2.
- "L'Exposition Provinciale. Département de l'Industrie". Le Constitutionnel (Newspaper) (in French). Vol. 15, no. 103 (Trois-Rivières, 1868–1884 ed.). Montreal (QC), Canada. September 22, 1882. p. 2.
- "The Exhibition. Prize List Continued". The Daily Witness (Newspaper). Vol. 21, no. 224 (John Dougall ed.). Montreal (QC), Canada. September 25, 1882. p. 2.
- "Art Association. General Meeting - Lecture By Rev. Dr. Norman". Montreal Herald and Daily Commercial Gazette (Newspaper). Vol. 75, no. 30 (Robert Weir ed.). Montreal (QC), Canada. February 5, 1883. p. 7.
- "Art Matters. The Stained Glass for the drawing room of Stephen's Mansion". The Daily Witness (Newspaper). Vol. 22, no. 136 (John Dougall ed.). Montreal (QC), Canada. June 11, 1883. p. 8.
- "The Stained Glass for Mr. Geo. Stephen's Mansion". The Montreal Gazette (Newspaper). Vol. 112, no. 141 (John Dougall ed.). Montreal (QC), Canada. June 13, 1883. p. 3.
- "Imports. From Sea. Per SS Sardinian, Joseph E. Dutton, master, from Liverpool". Montreal Herald and Daily Commercial Gazette (Newspaper). Vol. 75, no. 175 (Robert Weir ed.). Montreal (QC), Canada. July 24, 1883. p. 1.
- "Imports. From Sea. Per SS Peruvian, Joseph Ritchien, master, from Liverpool". Montreal Herald and Daily Commercial Gazette (Newspaper). Vol. 75, no. 193 (Robert Weir ed.). Montreal (QC), Canada. August 14, 1883. p. 1.
- "The St. John Dominion Exhibition. List of the Exhibitors from this Province. A Fine Representation". Montreal Herald and Daily Commercial Gazette (Newspaper). Vol. 75, no. 230 (Robert Weir ed.). Montreal (QC), Canada. September 26, 1883. p. 7.
- "The Montreal Prize. Awards at the St-John Exhibition". The Daily Witness (Newspaper). Vol. 22, no. 245 (John Dougall ed.). Montreal (QC), Canada. October 6, 1883. p. 6.
- "Centennial Exhibition. Prize List". The Daily Telegraph (Newspaper). Vol. 15, no. 73. St. John (N.B.), Canada. October 8, 1883. p. 3.
- "The Dominion Exhibition. More Montreal Prize Winners". The Montreal Star (Newspaper). Vol. 15, no. 237 (George T. Lanigan; Hugh Graham. ed.). Montreal (QC), Canada. October 8, 1883. p. 3.
- "St. Stephen's Church. The New Edifice to be Opened on Sunday Week". The Montreal Daily Star (Newspaper). Vol. 16, no. 70 ([Montreal daily star], 1881–1951 ed.). Montreal (QC), Canada. March 22, 1884. p. 6.
- "In Memoriam. Art Glass for Rock Ferry (Cheshire), England. Description of a Fine Memorial Window. (Louisa Atkinson)". The Daily Witness (Newspaper). Vol. 16, no. 70 (John Dougall ed.). Montreal (QC), Canada. July 26, 1884. p. 7.
- "The Exhibition. Meeting of the Permanent Committee". The Montreal Daily Star (Newspaper). Vol. 16, no. 184 ([Montreal daily star], 1881–1951 ed.). Montreal (QC), Canada. August 6, 1884. p. 4.
- "The Dominion Exhibition". Montreal Herald and Daily Commercial Gazette (Newspaper). Vol. 76, no. 214 (Robert Weir ed.). Montreal (QC), Canada. September 5, 1884. p. 7.
- "The Dominion Exhibition. The Opening Yesterday". Montreal Herald and Daily Commercial Gazette (Newspaper). Vol. 76, no. 215 (Robert Weir ed.). Montreal (QC), Canada. September 6, 1884. p. 7.
- "The Exhibition". The Montreal Daily Star (Newspaper). Vol. 16, no. 211 ([Montreal daily star], 1881–1951 ed.). Montreal (QC), Canada. September 6, 1884. p. 5.
- "The Exhibition. The Prize List". Montreal Herald and Daily Commercial Gazette (Newspaper). Vol. 76, no. 218 (Robert Weir ed.). Montreal (QC), Canada. September 10, 1884. p. 7.
- "The Exhibition. The Prize List". The Montreal Daily Star (Newspaper). Vol. 16, no. 214 ([Montreal daily star], 1881–1951 ed.). Montreal (QC), Canada. September 10, 1884. p. 2.
- "The Exhibition. The Prize List. (Continued.)". The Montreal Daily Star (Newspaper). Vol. 16, no. 215 ([Montreal daily star], 1881–1951 ed.). Montreal (QC), Canada. September 11, 1884. p. 2.
- "Exposition. Sixième Journée". La Minerve (Newspaper) (in French). Vol. 57, no. 4 (Augustin-Norbert Morin ed.). Montreal (QC), Canada. September 12, 1884. p. 1.
- "Imports. From Sea. Per SS Siberian, Robert A. Moore, master, from Glasgow". Montreal Herald and Daily Commercial Gazette (Newspaper). Vol. 76, no. 239 (Robert Weir ed.). Montreal (QC), Canada. October 4, 1884. p. 1.
- "Handsome Private Residence, 994 Sherbrooke Street, West End". The Montreal Daily Star (Newspaper). Vol. 16, no. 238 ([Montreal daily star], 1881–1951 ed.). Montreal (QC), Canada. October 8, 1884. p. 2.
- "The Wedding March". The Daily Witness (Newspaper). Vol. 23, no. 177 (John Dougall ed.). Montreal (QC), Canada. December 10, 1884. p. 6.
- "Our Building Progress. Stained Glass in the Houses of Modern Build. Something about the Styles. The Canada Stained Glass Works". The Daily Witness (Newspaper). Vol. 26, no. 295 (John Dougall ed.). Montreal (QC), Canada. December 15, 1885. p. 2.
- "Elaborate Stained Glass Windows, Messrs, J. C. Spence & Sons". Montreal Herald and Daily Commercial Gazette (Newspaper). Vol. 78, no. 94 (Robert Weir ed.). Montreal (QC), Canada. April 20, 1886. p. 1.
- "First Annual Dinner of the Provincial Association at the Balmoral Hotel Last Evening. Formal Opening of the House with Great Eclat". Montreal Herald and Daily Commercial Gazette (Newspaper). Vol. 78, no. 127 (Robert Weir ed.). Montreal (QC), Canada. May 27, 1886. p. 8.
- "A Foreign Order to a Montreal Firm". The Montreal Daily Star (Newspaper). Vol. 18, no. 152 ([Montreal daily star], 1881–1951 ed.). Montreal (QC), Canada. June 30, 1886. p. 2.
- "Notice. J. C. Spence & Sons. (Ad by John Sherpherd, Ottawa)". Ottawa Daily Citizen (Newspaper). Vol. 42, no. 27. Ottawa (ON), Canada. July 21, 1886. p. 1.
- "Saint Lambert New Church. Opening of the New Episcopal Church at St. Lambert - Description of the Building". The Montreal Daily Star (Newspaper). Vol. 18, no. 167 ([Montreal daily star], 1881–1951 ed.). Montreal (QC), Canada. July 29, 1886. p. 4.
- "American Presbyterian Church". The Daily Witness (Newspaper). Vol. 22, no. 186 (John Dougall ed.). Montreal (QC), Canada. August 11, 1886. p. 5.
- "Memorial Window (St. Matthew's Church, QC.)". Morning chronicle and commercial and shipping gazette (Newspaper). Vol. 41, no. 14830 (Charles St. Michel, 1850–1888 ed.). Montreal (QC), Canada. November 5, 1887. p. 3.
- "In Memoriam. A beautiful memorial window has been placed in the chancel of Christ Church, Rawdon, Quebec". The Daily Witness (Newspaper). Vol. 29, no. 198 (John Dougall ed.). Montreal (QC), Canada. August 23, 1888. p. 1.
- "Imports. From Sea. Per Royal Mail steamship Polynesian, from Liverpool". The Montreal Herald (Newspaper). Vol. 81, no. 248 (The Montreal Herald ed.). Montreal (QC), Canada. October 16, 1888. p. 2.
- "A Work of Art". The Gazette (Newspaper). Vol. 118, no. 75 (Postmedia Network Inc. ed.). Montreal (QC), Canada. March 28, 1889. p. 3.
- "Special Notice. J. C. Spence & Sons. (Bonaventure Station)". The Montreal Daily Star (Newspaper). Vol. 21, no. 208 ([Montreal daily star], 1881–1951 ed.). Montreal (QC), Canada. September 4, 1889. p. 4.
- "Sudden Death of Mr. Spence". The Gazette (Newspaper). Vol. 119, no. 222 (Postmedia Network Inc. ed.). Montreal (QC), Canada. September 16, 1890. p. 3.
- "Jottings about Town. Death of John C. Spence". The Montreal Herald (Newspaper). Vol. 83, no. 224 (The Montreal Herald ed.). Montreal (QC), Canada. September 16, 1890. p. 1.
- "Laid to Rest. An impressive Burial Service (John C . Spence)". The Montreal Daily Star (Newspaper). Vol. 22, no. 219 ([Montreal daily star], 1881–1951 ed.). Montreal (QC), Canada. September 17, 1890. p. 7.
- "The Late Mr. Spence". The Daily Witness (Newspaper). Vol. 21, no. 222 (John Dougall ed.). Montreal (QC), Canada. September 22, 1890. p. 4.
- "Partnership Registration. W. Ramsay Spence & J. P. Spence". The Montreal Daily Star (Newspaper). Vol. 22, no. 224 ([Montreal daily star], 1881–1951 ed.). Montreal (QC), Canada. September 23, 1890. p. 4.
- "Lake Beauport. New Anglican Church". Quebec morning chronicle (Newspaper). Vol. 44, no. 15755 (John J. Foote, 1888–1898 ed.). Quebec (QC), Canada. November 5, 1890. p. 4.
- "New Grace Church. Impressive Opening Ceremony". The Montreal Daily Star (Newspaper). Vol. 24, no. 220 ([Montreal daily star], 1881–1951 ed.). Montreal (QC), Canada. September 17, 1892. p. 4.
- "Stained Glass Pictures". The Daily Witness (Newspaper). Vol. 34, no. 68 (John Dougall ed.). Montreal (QC), Canada. March 22, 1893. p. 4.
- "Stained Glass Windows". The Montreal Daily Star (Newspaper). Vol. 26, no. 145 ([Montreal daily star], 1881–1951 ed.). Montreal (QC), Canada. June 21, 1894. p. 4.
- "To Join the Theatrical Profession". The Montreal Daily Star (Newspaper). Vol. 26, no. 188 ([Montreal daily star], 1881–1951 ed.). Montreal (QC), Canada. August 11, 1894. p. 8.
- "At the Art Gallery. (Exhibition of Architectural Drawings)". The Montreal Daily Star (Newspaper). Vol. 26, no. 235 ([Montreal daily star], 1881–1951 ed.). Montreal (QC), Canada. October 5, 1894. p. 6.
- "The New Baptistry. (Church of St. John the Evangelist)". The Montreal Daily Star (Newspaper). Vol. 26, no. 277 ([Montreal daily star], 1881–1951 ed.). Montreal (QC), Canada. November 24, 1894. p. 8.
- "Some Beautiful Memorial Windows. (Trinity Church of Muscatine, Iowa)". The Montreal Daily Star (Newspaper). Vol. 28, no. 75 ([Montreal daily star], 1881–1951 ed.). Montreal (QC), Canada. March 28, 1896. p. 16.
- "A Memorial Window. (in memory to Henry Yates)". The Daily Witness (Newspaper). Vol. 37, no. 137 (John Dougall ed.). Montreal (QC), Canada. June 11, 1896. p. 5.
- "On Stained Glass. A Very interesting Lecture by Dean Norman. The History of the Art". The Herald (Newspaper). Vol. 90, no. 30 (The Herald Publishing Company, 1896–1899 ed.). Montreal (QC), Canada. February 5, 1897. p. 1.
- "Fine Work in Stained Glass. (English Cathedral at Kingston, Ont.)". The Daily Witness (Newspaper). Vol. 38, no. 32 (John Dougall ed.). Montreal (QC), Canada. February 8, 1897. p. 10.
- "The Late Senator Kaulbach. A Beautiful Stained-Glass Window in His Memory". The Daily Witness (Newspaper). Vol. 38, no. 73 (John Dougall ed.). Montreal (QC), Canada. March 27, 1897. p. 10.
- "A Handsome Window. (In memory of late Senetor Kaulbach)". The Herald (Newspaper). Vol. 90, no. 73 (The Herald Publishing Company, 1896–1899 ed.). Montreal (QC), Canada. March 29, 1897. p. 8.
- "Tutelle Office Registers". The Montreal Daily Star (Newspaper). Vol. 31, no. 213 ([Montreal daily star], 1881–1951 ed.). Montreal (QC), Canada. September 11, 1899. p. 12.
- "Business Notes". The Herald (Newspaper). Vol. 92, no. 215 (The Herald Publishing Company, 1896–1899 ed.). Montreal (QC), Canada. September 12, 1899. p. 1.
- "This date 30 years ago". The Montreal Daily Star (Newspaper). Vol. 31, no. 251 ([Montreal daily star], 1881–1951 ed.). Montreal (QC), Canada. October 25, 1899. p. 4.
- "Bury". Sherbrooke Daily Record (Newspaper). Vol. 31, no. 251 ([Eastern Township Publishing],[1897]-1969 ed.). Montreal (QC), Canada. December 22, 1899. p. 3.
- "Marvel of Beauty. New Chancel of Church St. James The Apostle". The Montreal Herald (Newspaper). Vol. 93, no. 129 (The Herald Publishing Company, 1899–1914 ed.). Montreal (QC), Canada. June 1, 1900. p. 5.
- "St. Andrew's Presbyterian Church in Huntingdon, QC". The Canadian Gleaner (Newspaper). Vol. 42 (Huntingdon : [Canadian gleaner], 1863–1912 ed.). Huntingdon (QC), Canada. June 22, 1905. p. 2.
- "M. Paul Caron". Le Monde Illustré (Newspaper) (in French). Vol. 17, no. 868 (Berthiaume et Sabourin, 1884–1902 ed.). Montreal (QC), Canada. October 22, 1900. p. 10.
- "Montreal Art Glass Work Reg". Sherbrooke Daily Record (Newspaper). Vol. 23 ([Eastern Township Publishing],[1897]-1969 ed.). Montreal (QC), Canada. April 17, 1920. p. 7.
- "Décès : Alexander Spence". La Presse (Newspaper) (in French). Vol. 86, no. 221 ([La presse], 1884–2017 ed.). Montreal (QC), Canada. July 23, 1920. p. 16.
- A. Breault (June 21, 1978). "Harmonieuses et belles, telles sont les églises de Saint-Henri de Mascouche". La Revue (Newspaper) (in French) (Revue de Terrebonne inc.,1977- , [Terrebonne, Québec] : Médialo ed.). Terrebonne (QC), Canada. p. 10.
- Nicole Jarry (June 18, 1986). "Des trésors culturels ornent l'église Sainte-Anne de Varennes". La Seigneurie (Newspaper) (in French) (Boucherville : Les Publications Charles Desmarteau Inc., 1965–2018 ed.). Boucherville (QC), Canada. p. 33.
- "Église anglicane St. Mark (1842)". La Presse (Newspaper) (in French) ([La presse], 1884–2017 ed.). Montreal (QC), Canada. July 28, 1994. p. 5.
- "Chapelle St. Mark". La Presse (Newspaper) (in French) ([La presse], 1884–2017 ed.). Montreal (QC), Canada. June 8, 1996. p. 11 (Cahier H.
- Stéphane Baillargeon (September 3, 1996). "Des miracles de verre : le Québec est la terre des mille vitraux". Le Devoir (Newspaper) (in French). Vol. 87, no. 205 (Le devoir, 1910- ed.). Montreal (QC), Canada. p. 2 (Cahier A).
- Françoise Tardy (March 1, 2003). "Les vitraux de l'église du village, une richesse à découvrir". Le sentier : journal communautaire de St-Hippolyte (Newspaper) (in French). Vol. 21, no. 1 (Le sentier, 1983- ed.). Saint-Hippolyte (QC), Canada. p. 1.
- Denis Lord (June 13, 2007). "Une église en deux temps : l'église D'Ange-Gardien". La voix de l'Est (Newspaper) (in French). Vol. Special Edition (La voix de l'Est, 1935- ed.). Granby (QC), Canada. p. 2.
- Susan McGuire (September 2, 2008). "Atwater Library at 180. Drawing Classes at the Mechanics' Institute". Westmount Independent (Newspaper). Vol. 1, no. 1 (Sherbrooke-Valois inc., 2007- ed.). Westmount (QC), Canada. p. 13.
- Guillaume Poulin-Goyer (June 14, 2009). "Les dessous d'un temple sacré : Basilique Sainte-Anne de Varennes". La Seigneurie (Newspaper) (in French). Vol. 45, no. 33 (Boucherville : Les Publications Charles Desmarteau Inc., 1965–2018 ed.). Boucherville (QC), Canada. p. 3.
- Chantale Lefebvre; Cecilia Capocchi (2019). "Église anglicane St-Luke de Waterloo". La Seigneurie (Newspaper) (in French) (Granby : Société d'histoire de la Haute-Yamaska ed.). Granby (QC), Canada. p. 7.

=== Websites ===
- Gouvernement du Québec. "John C. Spence and Sons". Répertoire du patrimoine culturel du Québec. Quebec City (QC), Canada.: Ministère de la Culture.
- Serge Rodrigue. "John Charles Spence". Atelier Rodrigue. Sherbrooke (QC), Canada.: Atelier Rodrigue.
- "Drawing Classes at the Mechanics' Institute". atwaterlibrary.ca. Montreal (QC), Canada.: Atwater Library.
