= Mac Ruaidhrí =

The Gaelic surname Mac Ruaidhrí means "son of Ruaidhrí". The personal name Ruaidhrí is composed of two elements: the first is ruadh, meaning "red"; the second is rí, meaning "king".

Surnames which are in some cases derived from Mac Ruaidhrí include: Creery, Creary, McCreary, McCrery, McCrorey, McCrorie, McCrory, McGroary, McGrory, McRorie, McRory, McRury, Roger, Rogers, Rorie, Rorison, and Rory.

A variant of Mac Ruaidhrí is Mac Ruidhrí. Surnames which are in some cases derived from Mac Ruidhrí include: Creary, McCrary, McCreary, McCreery, and McCrery.

One particular family that has borne the surname Mac Ruaidhrí is Clann Ruaidhrí. Members of this Scottish family settled in Ulster as gallowglass commanders in the Middle Ages, and are last recorded acting as such in the fourteenth century. A family bearing forms of the name produced herenachs for the parish of Ballynascreen.

== People ==
=== mac Ruaidhrí ===
- Ailéan mac Ruaidhrí (died ×1296)
- Dubhghall mac Ruaidhrí (died 1268)

=== Mac Ruaidhrí ===
- Lachlann Mac Ruaidhrí (fl. 1297–1307/1308)
- Raghnall Mac Ruaidhrí (died 1346)
- Ruaidhrí Mac Ruaidhrí (died 1318?)
