= William McCreery =

William McCreery may refer to:

- William McCreery (Maryland politician), U.S. Representative from Maryland
- William McCreery (Pennsylvania politician), U.S. Representative from Pennsylvania
- William B. McCreery, former mayor of the City of Flint, Michigan State Treasurer and diplomat
- William C. McCreery (1896–1988), American lawyer and member of the New York State Assembly
