= Scottish names in Ulster =

The plantation of Ulster in the 17th century led to many Scottish people settling in Ireland. These are the surnames of the original Scottish settlers from 1606 to 1641, who would go on to become the 'Scotch-Irish'.

== A ==
- Abercrombie
- Acheson
- Achmootie
- Adair
- Adams
- Agnew
- Aicken
- Alexander
- Algeo
- Allen
- Allison
- Anderson
- Andrews
- Arkles
- Arnett
- Austin

== B ==
- Bailie
- Barbour
- Barkley
- Barr
- Bauld
- Beattie
- Bell
- Bennett (Bennet)
- Black
- Blackwood
- Blair
- Boyd
- Bozwell
- Brackley
- Brisbane
- Brown
- Bruce
- Bryce
- Buchanan
- Burke
- Burne
- Burns
- Buthill

== C ==
- Cahoon
- Calte
- Calwell
- Campbell
- Carcott
- Carlile
- Carmichael
- Carothers
- Carslaw
- Carson
- Cathcart
- Catherwood
- Cawder
- Chambers
- Clapham
- Clendinning
- Cloggie
- Coch
- Colquhoun
- Colville
- Consiglia
- Cooper
- Cowper
- Craig
- Crawford
- Creighton
- Creire
- Crosby
- Cunningham
- Cummings
- Cuthbertson

== D ==
- Danielston
- Davidson
- Davyson
- Deans
- Deinbone
- Demstar
- Dewar
- Dick
- Dickson
- Doninge
- Dougal
- Douglas
- Drum
- Drummond
- Dunbar
- Dunlop
- Dunsayer
- Dykes

== E ==
- Echlin
- Edmonston
- Edwards
- Ekyn
- Elliott
- Ellis
- Elpinstone
- Eames, Eanes
- English
- Erving
- Evans
- Ewart

== F ==
- Farquhar
- Farquharson
- Fenton
- Ferguson
- Ferly
- Ferry
- Forester
- Fingleton
- Finlay
- Flack
- Fleming
- Forecheade
- Forsith (Forsyth/Forsythe)
- Frazer
- Freeborne
- Fullerton
- Fulton
- Futhie
- Fyieff

== G ==
- Gaate
- Galbraith
- Galt
- Gamble
- Gemmil
- Gibb
- Gibson
- Gilmore
- Glass
- Glen
- Glye
- Gordon
- Graham
- Granger
- Granton
- Gray
- Greenshields
- Greer
- Grindall
- Gryme
- Gryn
- Glenney

== H ==
- Haldane
- Hall
- Hamill
- Hamilton
- Harne
- Harper
- Harvey
- Hatrick
- Heigate
- Henderson
- Hendrie
- Hendry
- Henrison
- Henry
- Hepburn
- Highgate
- Hilton
- Hogg
- Holmes
- Honis
- Hood
- Hope
- Howell
- Howie
- Howson
- Hudgsone
- Huggin
- Hunter
- Hutchine

== J ==
- Johnson
- Johnston
- Julius
- Jess

== K ==
- Karns
- Karnes
- Kee
- Keeland
- Kelson
- Kinnear
- Knox
- Kuming
- Kyd
- Kyle

== L ==
- Laderdeill
- Lainge
- Lauder
- Lawes
- Lawson
- Laycock
- Leckey
- Leech
- Leitch
- Leslie
- Lindsay
- Livingstone
- Lockhard
- Lodge
- Logan
- Logy
- Lother
- Love
- Luke
- Lutfoot
- Lynn

== M, Mac, Mc ==
- MacDonald
- Machell
- Machen
- MacIntyre
- Mackeson
- Macklelland (McClellan/McClelland)
- Mathysin (Matheson)
- Maxwell
- McAlexander
- McAula
- McAulay
- McAuld
- McBennett
- McBurney
- McCamuel
- McCashin
- McCassick
- McCausland
- McClairne
- McCoy
- McCrery
- McCullough
- McDougall
- McDowell
- McErdy
- McEvene
- McEwen
- McFarland
- McGern
- McGibbon/ McKibben
- McIlchany
- McIlmurry
- McIlveyne
- McIlwrath
- McKaudy
- McKay
- McKee
- McKernan
- McKilmun
- McKinney
- McKittrick
- McKnight
- McKym
- McLellan
- McLintagh (McClintock)
- McLoghery
- McLornan
- McMakene
- McMath
- McMillin
- McNaughton
- McNilly
- McPhedrish
- McVegany
- Means
- Meen
- Melvin
- Mikell
- Millar
- Miller
- Mitchell
- Moffatt
- Molsed
- Moncrieg
- Monett
- Moneypenny
- Montgomery
- Moon
- Moorhead
- Morehead
- Morgan
- Morne
- Morrison
- Morton
- Mowlane
- Muntreeth
- Murdogh
- Murduff
- Mure
- Murray
- Musgrave

== N ==
- Nelson
- Nesbit
- Nevin
- Newburgh
- Niven
- Norris
- Nicholl

== O ==
- Orr

== P ==
- Paddin
- Parke
- Parker
- Paton
- Patton
- Patoun
- Patterson
- Peacock
- Peebles
- Peere
- Petticrew
- Plowright
- Pollock
- Pont
- Pooke
- Price
- Pringle
- Purveyance

== R ==
- Rae
- Ralston
- Ramsay
- Rankin
- Read
- Redgate
- Reid
- Richardson
- Riddell
- Ritchie
- Robb
- Robert
- Robin
- Robinson
- Robson
- Rodgers
- Roger
- Rose
- Rudd
- Russell

== S ==
- Sare
- Saunderson
- Sawer
- Sayne
- Scott
- Semple
- Seton
- Sharpe
- Shaw
- Shirloe
- Simpson
- Skingeor
- Smelley
- Smellham
- Smith
- Smyth
- Somervell
- Spence
- Spier
- Spottiswood
- Stanehouse
- Stanton
- Steele
- Stephenson
- Stevenson
- Stevin
- Stewart
- Strawbridge
- Sturgeon
- Sutherland
- Symington
- Symonson
- Syne

== T ==
- Tate
- Taylor
- Tees
- Thomas
- Thompson
- Thomson
- Todd
- Trail
- Trane
- Trench
- Trimble
- Tullis

== U ==
- Udney

== V ==
- Valentine
- Vance

== W ==
- Waddell
- Walker
- Wallace
- Wallis
- Walshe
- Walson
- Wanchop
- Wardlaw
- Watson
- Welsh
- Wightman
- Wigton
- Wilkie
- Williamson
- Wilson
- Witherspoon
- Wood
- Woodburn
- Woolson
- Wright
- Wylie
- Wyms

== Y ==
- Young
