= McCreery, West Virginia =

McCreery
- Unincorporated community
- Location within the state of West Virginia McCreery (the United States)
- Coordinates: 37°50′56″N 81°5′32″W
- Country: United States
- State: West Virginia
- County: Raleigh
- Elevation: 1,152 ft (351 m)
- Time zone: UTC-5 (Eastern (EST))
  - Summer (DST): UTC-4 (EDT)
- GNIS ID: 1555081

McCreery is an unincorporated community in Raleigh County, West Virginia, United States.

The community was named after James T. McCreery, the original owner of the town site.
