= McCrorey =

McCrorey may refer to:

== People ==
- John Graham McCrorey (1860–1923), American businessman
- Mary Jackson McCrorey (1867–1944), American educator, mission worker, and YWCA leader

== Other uses ==
- McCrory Stores, a retail chain founded by John Graham McCrorey

== See also ==
- McCrory (disambiguation)
