= McCreary =

McCreary is a surname. It is derived from the Irish and Scottish Gaelic surnames Mac Ruidhrí and Mac Ruaidhrí.

== People with the surname ==
- Aaron McCreary, American college baseball coach
- Bear McCreary (born 1979), American composer and musician
- Bill McCreary (disambiguation), a number of people involved in ice hockey
- Conn McCreary (1921–1979), American Hall of Fame jockey and trainer in Thoroughbred horse racing
- David B. McCreary (1826–1906), American politician from Pennsylvania
- Ethel McCreary, Canadian All-American Girls Professional Baseball League player
- George Deardorff McCreary (1846–1915), U.S. Representative from Pennsylvania
- Hiram McCreary, Canadian politician
- James B. McCreary (1838–1918), Governor of Kentucky, U.S. Representative and Senator
- Jay McCreary (1918–1995), American basketball player and coach
- Foley (musician), stage name of Joseph McCreary, Jr.
- John McCreary (1761–1833), U.S. Representative from South Carolina
- Keith McCreary (1940–2003), National Hockey League player
- Loaird McCreary (born 1953), American football player
- Lori McCreary, American film producer and computer scientist
- Roger McCreary (born 2000), American football player
- William McCreary (1855–1904), Canadian politician, mayor of Winnipeg and member of the House of Commons
