= Liverpool Academy of Arts =

Coordinates: 53°24′10.1″N 2°58′53.5″W

The Liverpool Academy of Arts was founded in Liverpool in April 1810 as a regional equivalent of the Royal Academy, London. It followed the Liverpool Society of Artists, first founded in 1769, which had a fitful existence until 1794. Two local art collectors, Henry Blundell and William Roscoe were its first Patron and Secretary, the prince regent George gave his patronage for the next three years, and it was actively promoted by presidents of the Royal Academy.

It had a teaching school and staff included William Spence who served as its Professor of Drawing in the 1840s.

Its membership included local artists such as the landscapists John Rathbone, Richard Ansdell, Thomas Chubbard, Alfred William Hunt and Charles Barber, and the sculptor John Gibson.

Leading artists of the day competed for its prize of £50 for non-local contributors to its annual exhibition, including J. M. W. Turner, Henry Fuseli, John Martin and Joseph Wright of Derby.

In the late 1850s, however, it split due to major disagreements following annual prizes being awarded to the then controversial Pre-Raphaelite painters, particularly to William Holman Hunt in 1852 for Valentine Rescuing Sylvia from Proteus and to Millais in 1857 for The Blind Girl.

The Academy remained nominally in existence, continuing to hold annual exhibitions, but never regaining its national importance.
