= Roscoe McCrary =

American politician

Member of the U.S. House of Representatives from Missouri's 82nd district
- Succeeded by: Billlie Boykins

Missouri House of Representatives
- In office 1975–1979

Personal details
- Born: 1922 St. Louis, Missouri
- Died: 1991 (aged 68–69) St. Louis, Missouri
- Party: Democratic
- Children: 1 daughter
- Occupation: restaurant owner

Roscoe L. McCrary (October 31, 1922 - July 17, 1991) was a Democratic politician who served 4 years in the Missouri House of Representatives. He was born in St. Louis, Missouri and was educated at Dessalines and Jefferson elementary schools, Vashon High School, and Saint Louis University.
