= John McGrory =

Scottish footballer

Personal information
- Full name: John McGrory
- Place of birth: Scotland
- Position: Inside forward

Youth career
- Aberdeen University

Senior career*
Years	Team	Apps	(Gls)
1971–1972	Queen's Park	21	(0)

International career
1972	Scotland Amateurs	4	(0)
- * Club domestic league appearances and goals

John McGrory was a Scottish amateur footballer who played as an inside forward in the Scottish League for Queen's Park. He was capped by Scotland at amateur level.
