= John Alexander McCreery =

Dr. John Alexander McCreery (October 19, 1885 – January 31, 1948) was an American surgeon listed throughout the 1930s and 1940s as one of the top ten surgeons in the United States. Additionally, McCreery was chief of staff at Greenwich Hospital (Connecticut) from 1939 to 1948, and one of the founders of the American Board of Surgery.

== Early life ==
McCreery was born in New York City, the son of John Alexander McCreery, a respected New York City surgeon, and Louise Dowdal Carrigan. His father was the son of a Scottish immigrant, James McCreery, who settled in New York City in 1831; James McCreery later became a prominent wholesale dry-goods merchant. His mother was a daughter of Andrew Carrigan (1804-1872), a wealthy Irish-born philanthropist and provisions dealer who co-founded the Emigrant Savings Bank. The McCreery family were among the first parishioners at St. Patrick's Cathedral, New York, and several members of the family are interred inside the cathedral. McCreery had two younger sisters, Christine Forbes McCreery Hoguet (1886–1951) and Mary McKay McCreery (1888–1964). The family resided on Fifth Avenue in New York City.

McCreery was educated at the Cutler School (New York) and entered Harvard University in 1902, graduating in 1906. From there McCreery received a degree in medicine from Columbia University College of Physicians and Surgeons in 1910. During World War I, McCreery served as a Major in the Medical Corps, and was stationed in France. It was there in 1918 that he met Miss Eileen Birkett Ravenshaw of England, an ambulance driver stationed in France as well. Miss Ravenshaw, a member of the prominent Ravenshaw family of England, was a daughter of Charles Withers Ravenshaw, a lieutenant colonel in the Indian Political Service appointed by Queen Victoria who later served as a governor of the British colony of Nepal from 1902 to 1905. The Ravenshaw Family descends from John Goldsborough Ravenshaw II, chairman and director of the British East India Company between 1819 and 1832, and descends from Sir William Withers, one time Lord Mayor of London. McCreery and Ravenshaw were married on November 26, 1918, and settled in New York City.

== Medical career ==
McCreery started off as a private physician in New York City, however later took a position as chief of surgery at Bellevue Hospital Center during the early 1920s. In 1925, McCreery transferred positions from Bellevue to Greenwich Hospital (Connecticut), and was appointed chief of surgery there. At this point, McCreery was also serving as president of both the New York Surgical and Greenwich Medical Societies, and kept offices in both Greenwich and New York City. In 1937, Dr. McCreery helped establish the American Board of Surgery. Two years later, in 1939, McCreery was appointed chief of staff at Greenwich Hospital, a position he held up until his death in 1948. At Greenwich Hospital, McCreery was widely credited as being responsible for modernizing the technology used during surgery, quickly putting Greenwich Hospital as one of the top hospitals in the New York City area.

== McCreery family and personal life ==
In 1919, while residing in New York, Dr. and Mrs. McCreery gave birth to twin daughters Joan Anne (1919–2005) and Lalande Louise McCreery (1919–1983). Two years later, a third daughter, Sheila Mary McCreery (1921–1997), was born. The McCreery girls were high society debutantes, making their debuts in 1938 and 1939, respectively. The three girls were also highly recognized equestriennes. After moving to Greenwich, Connecticut in 1931, the McCreery family resided at an English estate in the Khakum Wood section known as "Quiet Waters"; the house is currently owned by former U.S. Ambassador to Ireland Thomas C. Foley. The McCreerys additionally owned a historic home on Nantucket, Massachusetts, as well as the McCreery family estate in Stockbridge, "Council Grove".

McCreery died suddenly of pneumonia. He was survived by his wife, Eileen Ravenshaw McCreery; three daughters, Joan (Mrs. John Wynne Gerster), Lalande (Mrs. John William Keeshan), and Sheila (Mrs. Richard Newton Jackson, Jr.); and two sisters, Christine (Mrs. Ramsay Charles Hoguet) and Mary McCreery. The descendants of McCreery continue to reside in Greenwich, New York, Nantucket, and Baltimore.
