= John McCreery (printer) =

Irish printer

- Born: c. 1768; Burndunnet, Ireland
- Died: 18 April 1832; Paris, France
- Occupation: Printer

John McCreery (c. 1768 – 18 April 1832) was an Irish radical printer.

== Biography ==
McCreery was born circa 1768 in Burndunnet, near Strabane, County Tyrone. He was the son of a printer. He went to Liverpool, England, in the late 1780s, and became an apprentice of a local printer named George Wood.

In Liverpool, McCreery became involved with a group of radicals. In 1791, William Roscoe convinced McCreery to start his own printing shop. The first work McCreery published was The Dying Negro in 1792.

In 1805, McCreery moved his shop to London, where he printed for reformists such as John Cartwright, John Hobhouse, William Hazlitt, and Jeremy Bentham. McCreery was an intermediary between the Liverpool and London reformers.

On 18 April 1832, McCreery died of cholera while visiting Paris. He was buried at Kensal Green Cemetery.
