= Edward Spence =

Edward Spence may refer to:

- Edward Spence (VC) (1830–1858), British Army soldier who received the Victoria Cross
- Edward Falles Spence (1832–1892), American politician
- E. Lee Spence (born 1947), American archaeologist

== See also ==
- Benjamin Edward Spence (1822–1866), English sculptor
