= John Smith (banker) =

English banker (1797–1866)

John Smith JP
- Born: 29 August 1797; Aberdeen, Scotland
- Died: 23 September 1866 (aged 69); Belvedere House, Harrogate, West Riding of Yorkshire, England
- Burial place: Grove Road Cemetery, Harrogate
- Monuments: Massive stone monument at his grave
- Occupation: Banker
- Years active: 1825–1860
- Known for: Philanthropy; Funding St Matthias' Church, Burley; Founding the mansion Belvedere in Harrogate

John Smith JP (29 August 1797 – 23 September 1866) was a Scottish banker and philanthropist. He was born in Aberdeen, Scotland, and spent most of his adult life running Beckett's Bank in Leeds, England. In retirement, he lived in Harrogate.

Smith supported many charities, funding churches, schools and other causes in Abetdeen and Leeds. He paid for one of the bells in Kirk of St Nicholas in Aberdeen, and funded most of the building of St Matthias' Church, Burley, as well as Burley's vicarage and school, and other local needs. He was an active member of Leeds Chamber of Commerce and a Justice of the Peace. However he is remembered today for his foundation of "Belvedere", the Harrogate mansion which was built for him by Richard Ellis and designed by Perkin and Backhouse, and also for his large stone monument which stands in Grove Road Cemetery.

== Background ==
The youngest of four sons, Smith was born on 29 August 1797, in Aberdeen, Scotland, (Note: John Smith (29 August 1797 – 23 September 1866). GRO Index: Deaths Sep 1866 Smith John 69 Knaresbro' 9a 74, John Smith's dates are inscribed on his grave monument in Grove Road Cemetery) and baptised on 28 December 1798 at St Nicholas Church, Aberdeen. His parents were Alexander Smith, (Note: Alexander Smith (15 September 1765 – 27 August 1843).) and Margaret Smith née Howie, (Note: Margaret Smith née Howie (23 January 1763 – 25 August 1852)) both from Banffshire.

On 21 December 1822 at St Leonard's, Shoreditch, Smith married Ann Catherine Jane Metcalfe of Middlesex. (Note: Ann Catherine Jane Smith née Metcalfe (6 March 1805 – 8 June 1854). GRO Index: Deaths Jun 1854 Smith Ann Catherine Kensington 1a 69.) The eldest of their children mentioned in the Census is banker John Metcalfe Smith, (Note: John Metcalfe Smith (1829 – 1870)) born in Aberdeen. The next eldest was articled solicitor's clerk (later Bradford manufacturer) George Alderson Smith, born in Leeds in 1834. After him came Reverend William Alexander Smith M.A., (Note: William Alexander Smith (1840 – 23 August 1887). The gravestone of John Smith (banker) of Harrogate gives William Alexander Smith's dates.) who was minister of St Mary's Chapel, Aberdeen. The youngest were Catherine "Clara" Ann Smith, (Note: Catherine Ann Smith (born 2 May 1845).) and Fanny Beckett Smith. (Note: Fanny Beckett Smith (c.1846–1913).) Two of their grandchildren were Reginald Metcalfe Smith and Mabel Smith.

In Burley, Leeds, Smith's residence was Burley House, and in Harrogate, Belvedere in Victoria Avenue, but the Census does not mention Harrogate. In 1841, the England Census finds John Smith and his wife Ann living in Hyde Terrace, Leeds, with two of their sons: By 1851 the family had moved to Burley House on the corner of Burley Road and Cardigan Lane, and they had two sons, two daughters and three servants with them. Smith's first wife died in 1854.

On 27 March 1856 at St Mary the Less, Durham, Smith married his second wife Mary Anne Frances Hopper, from Chelmsford. (Note: Mary Anne Frances Smith née Hopper (born c.1804). GRO index: Marriages Mar 1856 Hopper Mary Ann Frances and Smith John, Durham 10a 263) Mary was the daughter of Walter Carles Hopper of Belmont, County Durham, a rich landowner. Mary's brother Rev. Augustus Hopper, honorary canon of Norwich, officiated at the wedding. Subsequently in 1861 the Census in Burley Lane, Leeds, finds Smith with his second wife Mary, and his son William is a student of Caius College, Cambridge. Although Smith is ill by this time, he describes himself as a banker and a West Riding of Leeds magistrate.

== Career ==
=== Aberdeen and London ===
Smith served his apprenticeship at the Old Aberdeen Savings Bank, Aberdeen. (Note: Old Aberdeen Savings Bank functioned between 1816 and 1855. Its records are kept at University of Aberdeen Special Collections, ref. GB 231 MS 638) Following his apprenticeship, he spent several years in "a large mercantile house" in London. In 1825, the Town and County Bank was established in Aberdeen, and he joined it as a teller, and the Banffshire Journal commented, "to this day [as of 1866] its notes are payable to John Smith or Bearer". Smith was "very much esteemed by his fellow officers in the Bank, and by the customers, for his business correctness and quiet, gentlemanly manners". Between 1830 and 1835 he held the "important" position of secretary to the Glasgow Union Bank.

=== Leeds ===
Smith first arrived in Leeds in 1835, joining the Leeds Banking Company (LBC) as its first manager. He remained in that position for five or six years, until William Beckett of the private bank Beckett & Co. (also known as Leeds Old Bank) became an MP in 1841. Smith was offered a partnership in the bank alongside William and Christopher Beckett, in response to the "admirable manner in which he administered the affairs" of the LBC. "The reputation of [Beckett's] was fully maintained and, if possible, enhanced by the accession of Mr Smith, whose business capabilities were of the highest order", and "his services in the bank were very highly valued by Mr Beckett". Smith was particularly adept at assisting customers who met with financial difficulties. In 1848 Smith, with the involvement of William Beckett, purchased the former Leeds Zoological and Botanical Gardens possibly as a building speculation, in which a section was to be reserved as a cemetery. This scheme was abandoned, and the land sold on. Smith remained at Beckett's as partner until his last illness began around 1860, when he was obliged to withdraw gradually from commercial business.

== Civic duties, institutions and philanthropy ==
Smith was involved in public duty and philanthropy in both Aberdeen and Leeds. In 1851 he was elected treasurer of Leeds Chamber of Commerce. In 1858, the same institution elected Smith to attend the select committee of the House of Commons to "give evidence in favour of the abolition of the clause which limits the Bank Directors in the issue of Bank of England notes to an amount of £14,475,000, except against gold, and that the Bank Directors be invested with a discretionary power to issue one pound notes of the Bank of England [whenever necessary]". In 1856, Smith was a member of the Leeds Honorary Board for the Scottish Widows Fund and Life Assurance Society. By 1861, he had become a magistrate for the West Riding of Yorkshire. Smith was on the building committee which aimed to erect a new hospital - The Ilkley Hospital and Convalescent Home - at Ilkley.

Smith was involved in a number of charitable institutions, including the Leeds West End People's Institute on Kirkstall Road in Burley, Leeds, where in 1856 he gave a speech at its first public meeting. In the same year he donated a harmonium to the new schoolroom associated with St Matthias' Church, Burley, which Smith had funded, and in which there are memorials to Smith and his first wife Ann Catherine Jane.

Of Smith's philanthropy, the Leeds Times said:

[Smith's] public spirit was evinced by the readiness with which he promoted the chief objects of benevolence which have interested [Leeds] of late years, while Burley church, parsonage and schools, to the erection and support of which he was the largest contributor, are monuments of his care for the religious and mental improvement of his poorer neighbours. His private charities were also large and numerous. Leeds Times, 1866.

The Yorkshire Post and Leeds Intelligencer reported:

[Smith's] generosity and kindness of heart were such that with him many a poor man will have lost a friend ever ready to help him in his need – a friend indeed, whose greatest happiness was going about to do good. Yorkshire Post, 1866.

The Banffshire Journal reported:

Very many ... who had a personal knowledge of [Smith], and of the benevolent and kind acts which he was constantly performing, will join most sincerely in their mourning and regret at the removal of such a man. He took a prominent interest in promoting the chief objects of benevolence in Leeds; while the church, parsonage and school at Burley, which were mostly built at his cost, will remain a monument of his good deeds, and of his care for the religious improvement of his poorer neighbours. He gave a large contribution to assist in procuring [Aberdeen's] peal of bells, and felt at all times a great interest in any improvement in his native city. We know that he was very anxious for the establishment of a convalescent hospital in Aberdeen, and in his last charities so very benevolent an object may possibly have been remembered. His private charities were many and large, and his considerate assistance will be missed in many quarters, where there will ever remain the memory of his personal gentleness and goodness of character". Banffshire Journal, 1866.

.

=== Kirk St Nicholas, Aberdeen ===
The abovementioned peal of bells, of which one was funded by Smith, was for the Kirk of St Nicholas, Aberdeen, and in 1858 the nine bells were inaugurated by nine trained bell-ringers, also paid for by Smith. Smith's name was inscribed on the D flat bell. However, in 1874 a "great fire" destroyed the bell tower and all the bells, of which the tenor bell weighed 32 cwt or 256 stone (1,630 kg).

=== St Matthias' Church, Burley ===
This is a listed building, to which Smith donated much of the cost of the build. It was designed in 1853 by Perkin and Backhouse, (who later designed Belvedere for Smith) and consecrated in November 1854. Smith donated the land for it, and "subscribed liberally to the building fund", supported by the Beckett family, of Beckett's Bank, who paid for the spire, communion plate, and bells. The east window was installed in memory of Smith's first wife Ann Catherine Jane, who died in June 1854, and three other windows are in memory of Smith and two of his sons. Smith also paid for the reredos in 1869. All the carved work completed by 1854, including the font, was credited to Robert Mawer. (Note: Robert Mawer died of chronic bronchitis in November 1854, and was carving Leeds Town Hall as well at the time, so he would have had help from Catherine Mawer and William Ingle.) A later addition to the church, in 1855, was a memorial to Smith's first wife: "a fine monument with crocketed pediment and pinnacles, and a carving in low relief of an angel with a departed spirit executed by Mr. B. Spence of Rome". It was described at greater length by the Leeds Intelligencer:

The monument is an exquisite piece of sculpture by Benjamin Spence, pupil of Gibson, and it was executed in Rome, from which the sculptor has lately returned. The design, in mezzo-relievo, represents an angel bearing the spirit of the deceased to heaven, and both in the arrangement of the group, and attitude in forms of the figures, and the sweet expression of composure thrown over the whole, it is exceedingly pleasing and impressive. The drapery gently floating in the breeze and the delicate feathering of the angel's wings are well worthy of note among the subordinate parts of the design. It is executed in pure white marble, and is inserted in a finely carved tabernacle or niche, in Sicilian marble, with crocketted canopy and enriched buttresses, of the Decorated Style, in conformity with the architecture of the building.

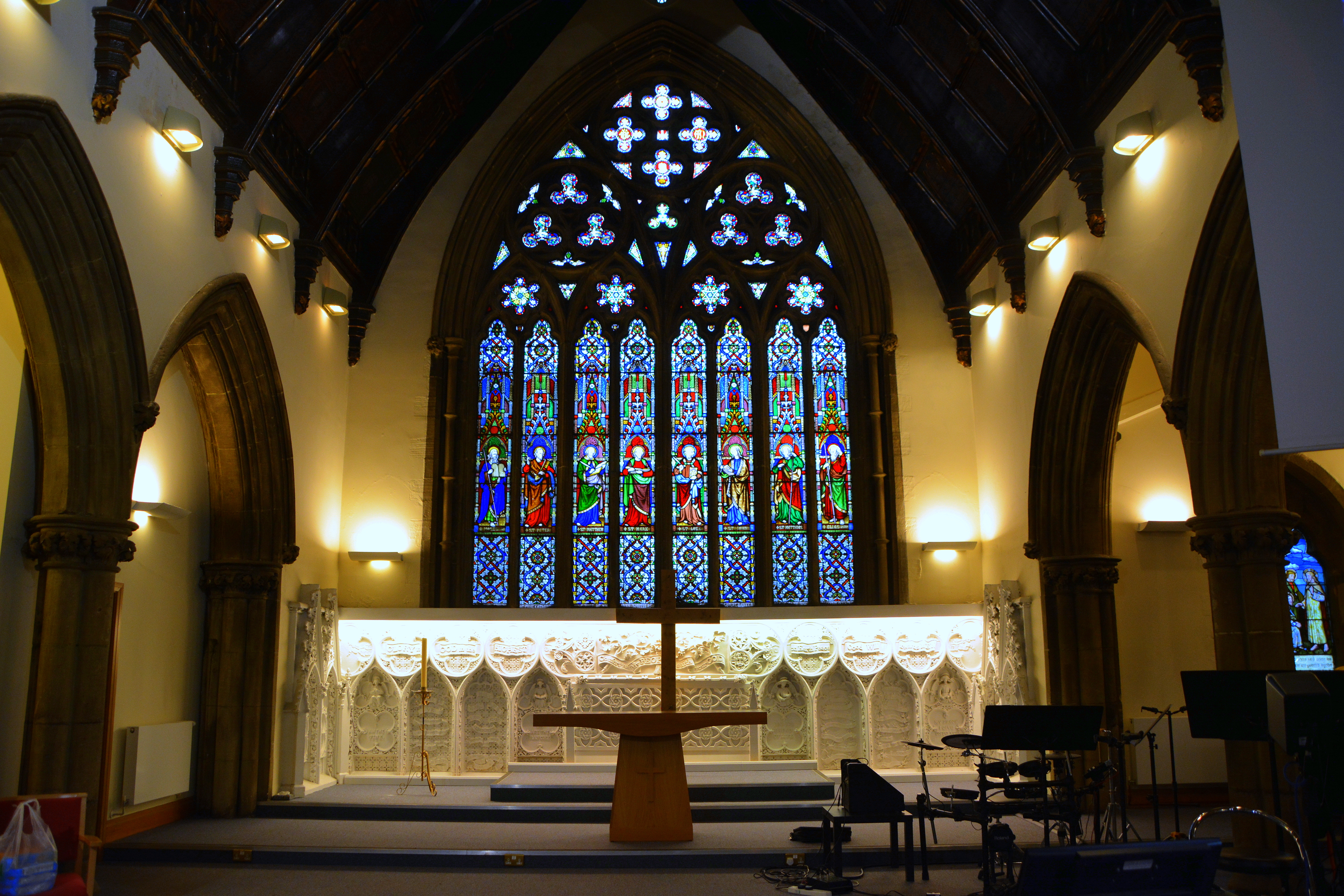
St Matthias east window, dedicated to Smith's first wife

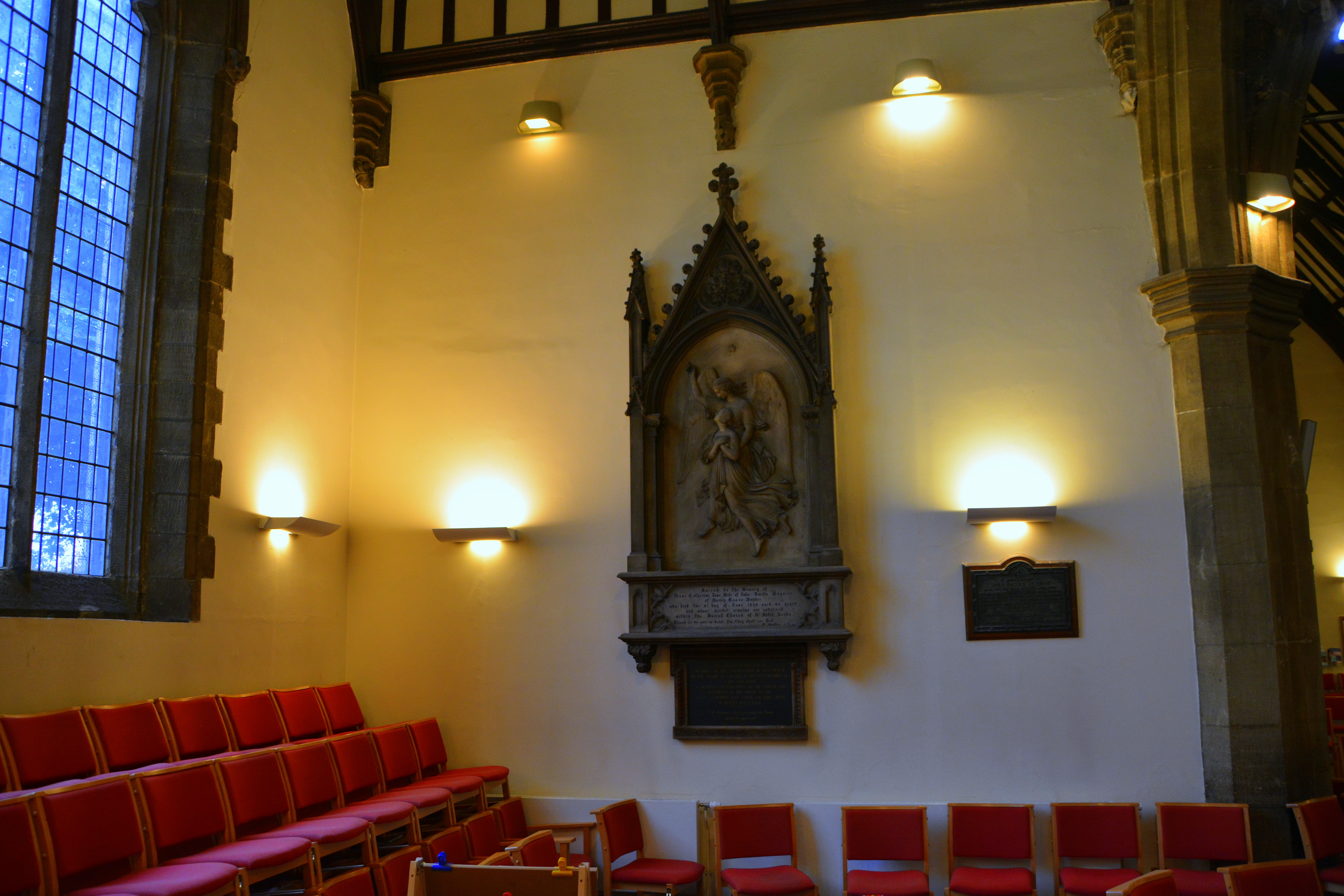
St Matthias transept memorial dedicated to Smith and family

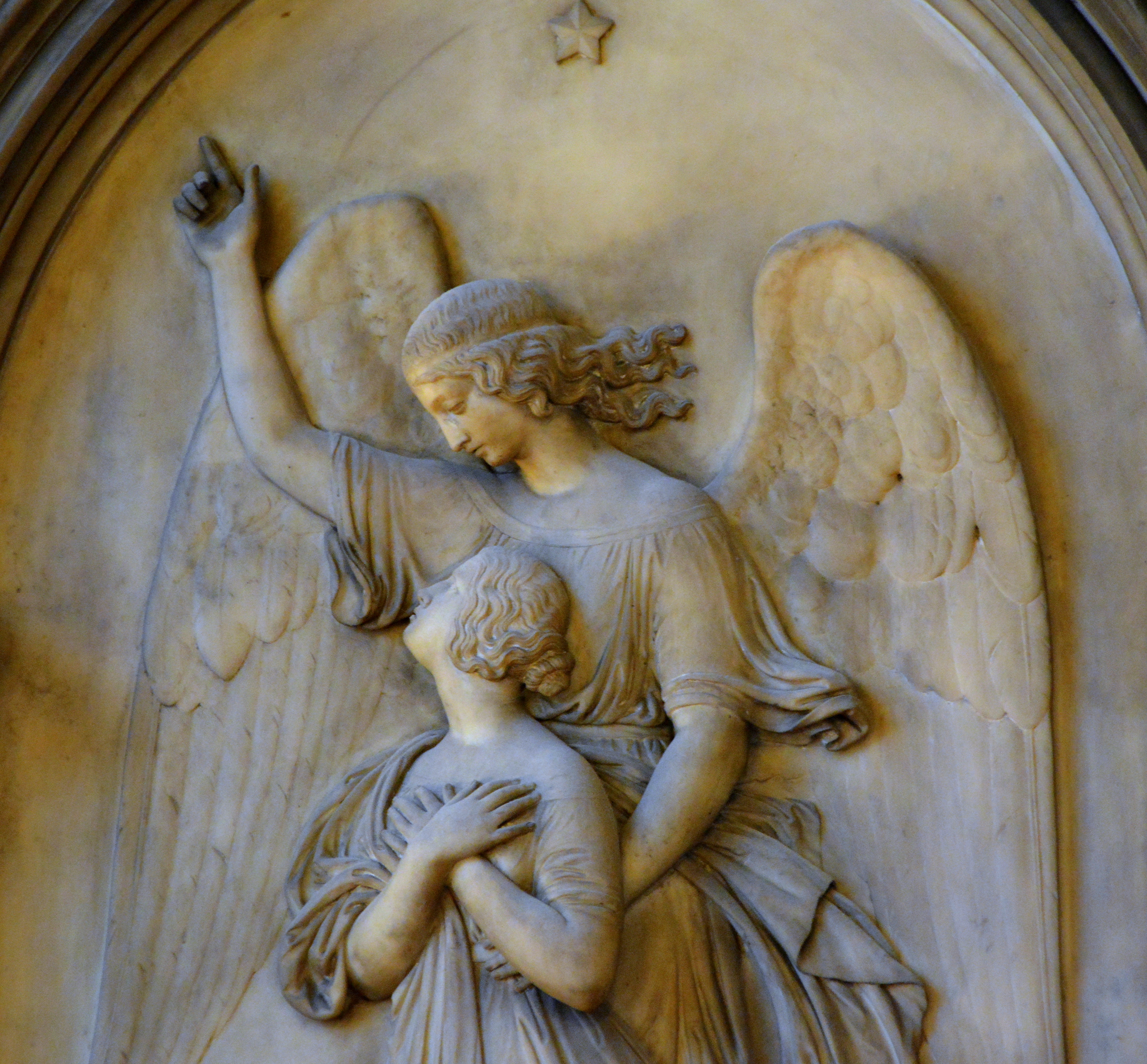
St Matthias memorial by Spence, dedicated to Smith's first wife

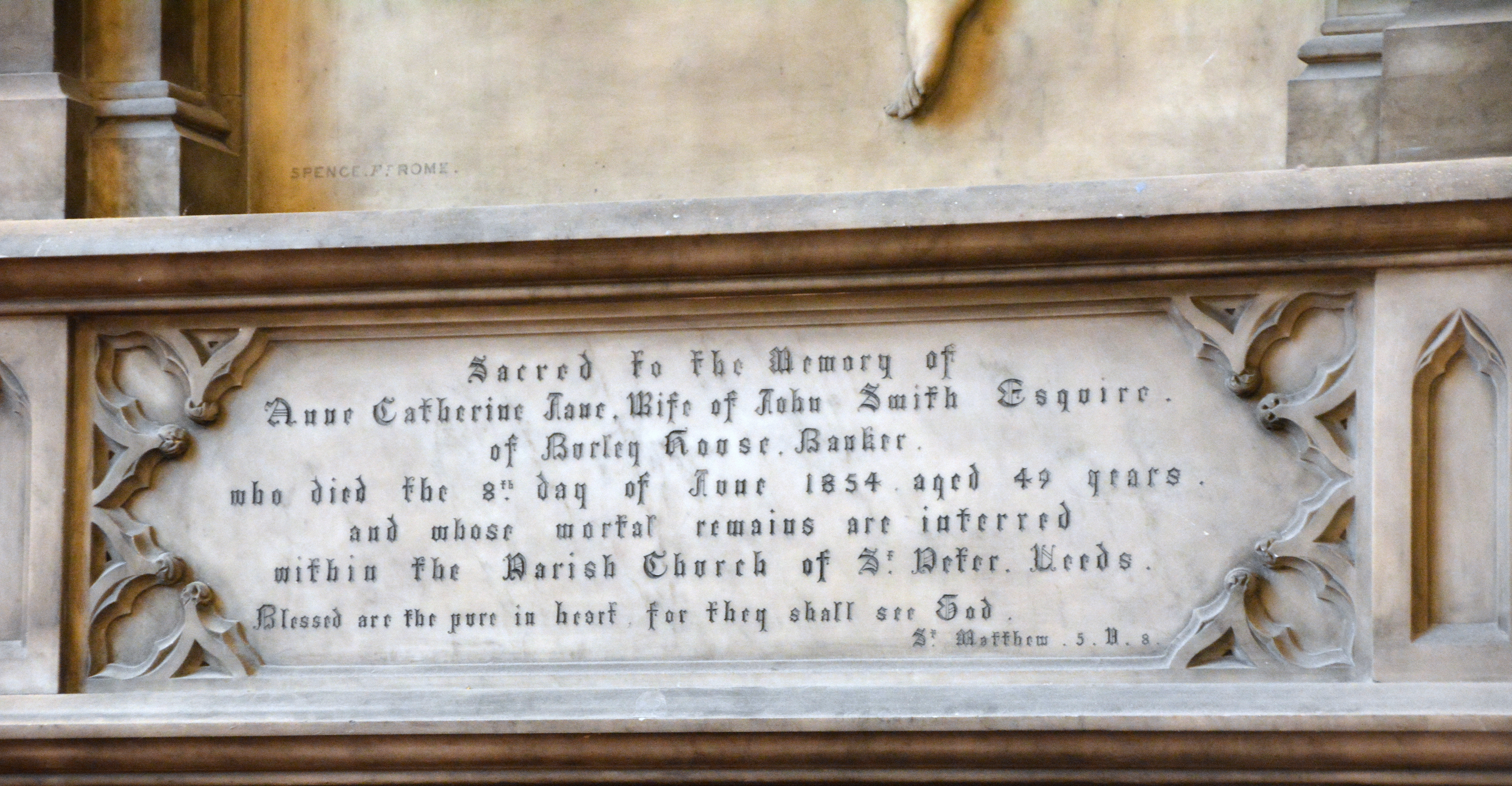
St Matthias memorial dedicated to Smith's first wife

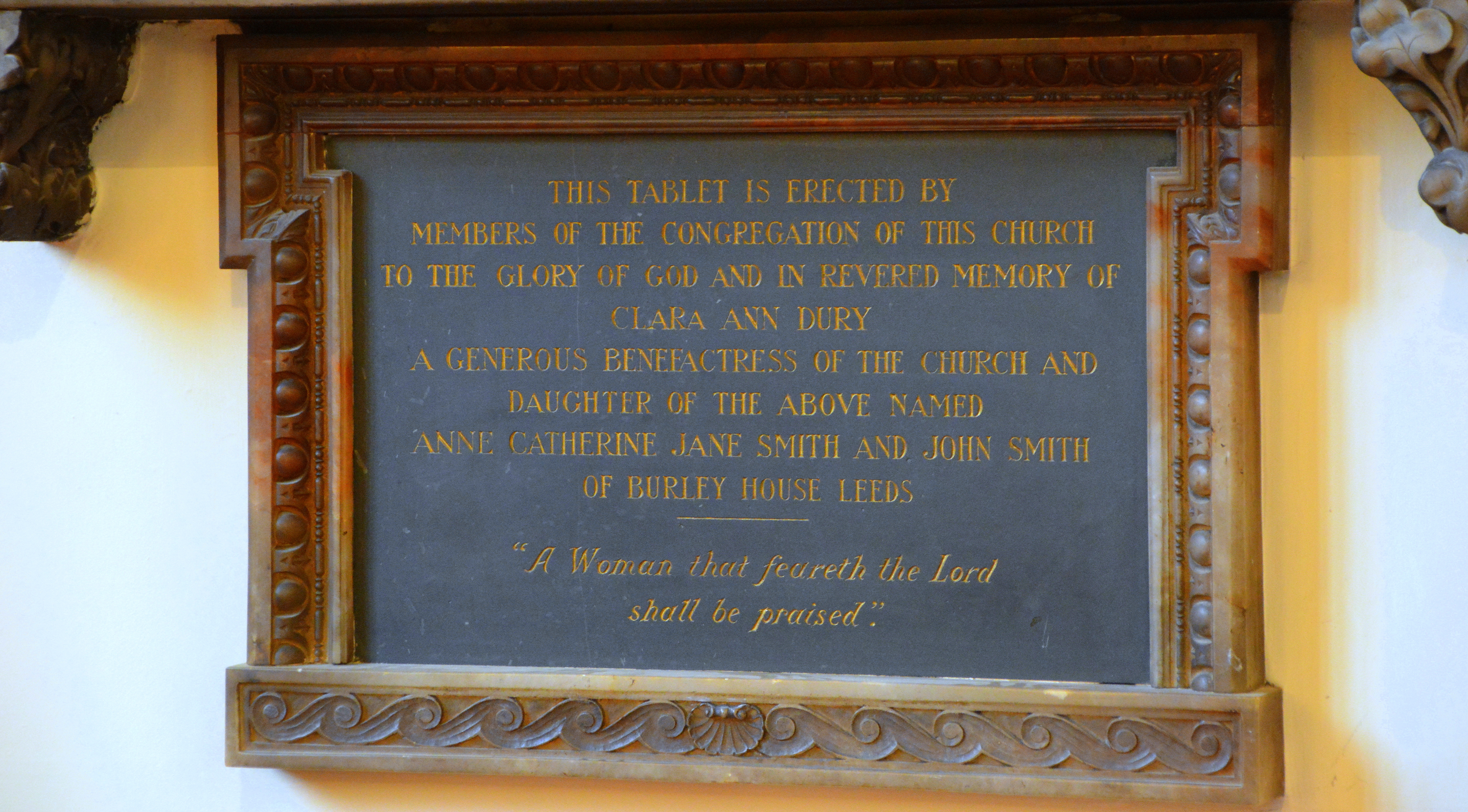
St Matthias memorial dedicated to Smith's family

== Residences ==
=== Burley House ===
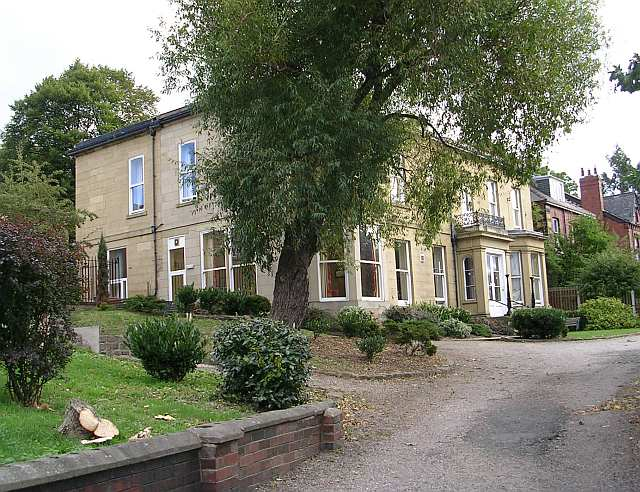
Burley House, Burley, Leeds

Smith moved into Burley House in Burley, Leeds in 1841. The house was burgled in 1843, and according to the Leeds Mercury: "A number of thieves effected an entrance into Burley House, the residence of John Smith, Esq., by the cellar windows, and stripped the larder of its contents". The house was more secure by the time it was burgled again in 1850. The Leeds Intelligencer tells the story:

Burley House [was] entered by thieves, but fortunately not so effectively as to give them access to much booty. It appears that they first penetrated into the ale-cellar and paid some attention to the liquor they found there, a considerable quantity of which they allowed to run to waste. They also removed an iron bar from the window of the butler's pantry, but did not succeed in effecting an entrance into that apartment, and finally they left the premises of Mr. Smith, taking nothing with them except the said iron bar and a bottle which had contained ale.

The miscreants then proceeded to employ the iron bar to burglariously enter and steal from the Misses Dixon at nearby Burley Cottage, leaving the ale bottle there, then to attempt, unsuccessfully, to enter the house of John Cudworth at Burley Villa. As of 2 February the thieves remained at large. While living at Burley House, Smith took part in the annual Burley floral and horticultural show, showing plants grown on his estate, including "Fuchsias, acacias, heaths", and at least nine types of fruit. The house was sold at the end of 1866, after Smith's death. The sales description by Hepper & Sons of Leeds was as follows: (Note: Burley House is now Burley House Specialist Care Centre, 258 Burley Road, Leeds, on the corner of Burley Road and Cardigan Lane, and not far from St Matthias Church. The Burley House where Smith lived is not to be confused with (a) the 1868 Burley House by George Corson in Clarendon Road, Leeds (Listed building 1375067), or (b) Burley House in Burley in Wharfedale.)

All that handsome and spacious mansion, the residence of the late John Smith, Esq., called Burley House, with the commodious stabling, conservatory, vineries, orchard houses, and gardens attached, comprising altogether 4 acres (1.6 ha) ... Also, all that field in front of the above, containing near 8 acres (3.2 ha).

=== Belvedere ===
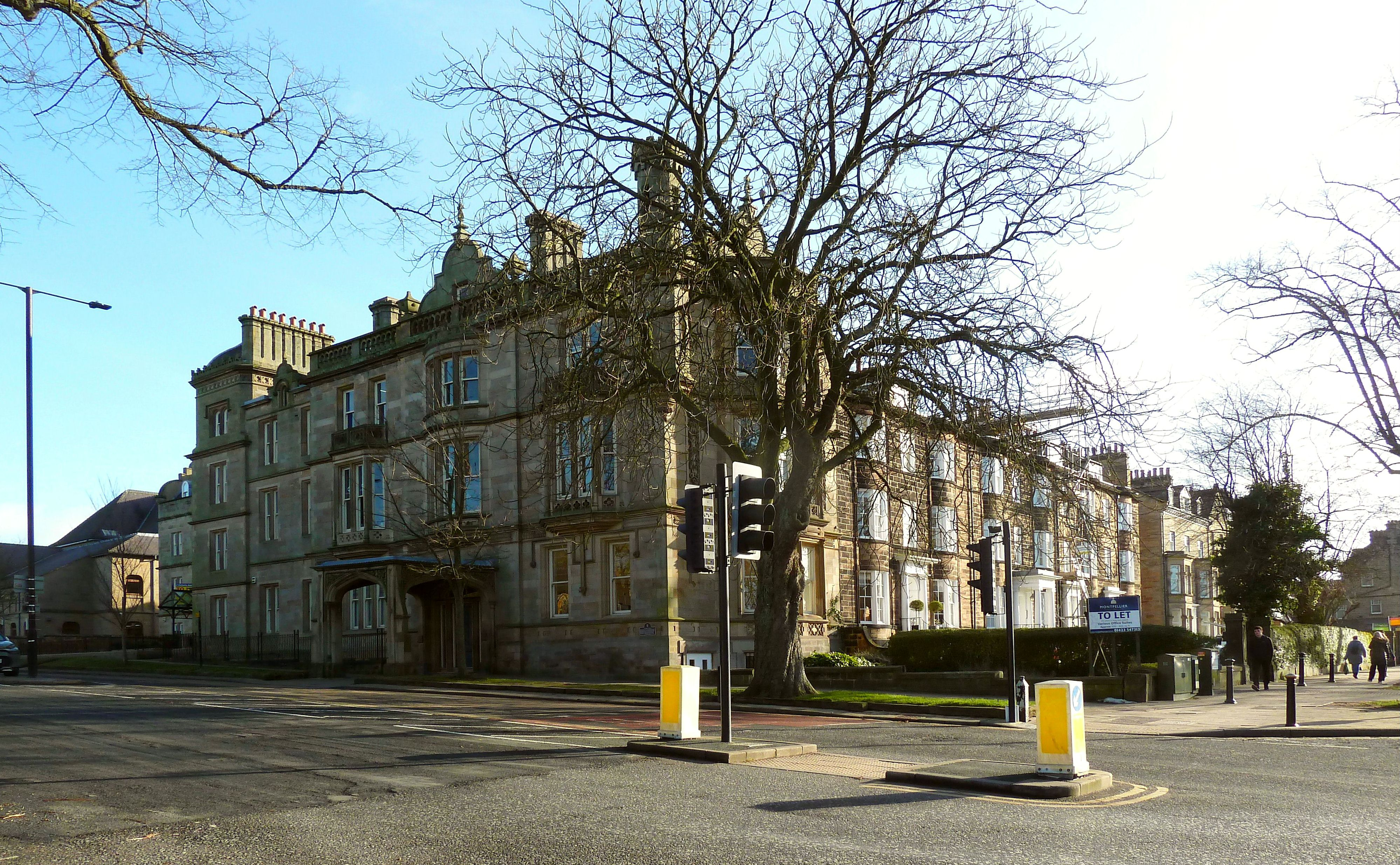
Belvedere House

This former mansion, Belvedere, Victoria Avenue, in Harrogate, was built by Richard Ellis around 1861 for Smith, as his own residence. The house name was originally spelled "Belvidere". It is a Grade II listed building, and was designed by architects Perkin and Backhouse. The ground was broken in 1860, and it was "only gradually brought to a partial completion". In its time, the building has contained St Peter's School and Harrogate School of Art, and it once had stabling on the south side. By 1923 it housed the Harrogate YMCA, and on 1 September of that year the Bishop of Ripon opened a Memorial Hall Gymnasium there. That room held a war memorial, which was later painted over, and then lost. As of 2023 the building had been divided into offices.

The two remaining original frontages of the house, facing The Stray and Victoria Avenue, are faced with Birk Crag stone. It has a tower, a flag tower which originally functioned as an observatory, and bay and oriel windows. The porte-cochère has carvings in cleansed Harehills stone. Although the interior is now converted into offices, it was once grand inside. The Yorkshire Post and Leeds Intelligencer described it thus in 1868, when Smith's family sold it:

[The vestibule has a] black and white marble floor and broad vein marble steps leading to the hall, from which it is separated by a handsome wood and plate-glass screen with folding doors. The hall ... has an elaborately decorated ceiling, is warmed by an expensive stove, and communicates with the upper floors by a broad winding staircase, with moulded walnut handrail and elegant iron ballusters and dome light. On the right of the hall is a well-proportioned morning-room ... having a costly Sienna marble mantelpiece and rich ceiling decorations; on the left is the dining room ... with a noble black and gold marble mantelpiece; a lavatory and separate entrance from the serving lobby, in which is a hoist adjoining the butler's pantry and bedroom. Further on are a water closet, side entrance to the street, and a waiting room or day-nursery. The first floor presents the truly splendid drawing-room, with its statuary, marble chimney-piece of most elegant design, a ceiling divided into compartments and profusely ornamented, and a fine bay window, from which are obtained views of vast extent, and unrivalled for variety and beauty. Next in order is a boudoir, opening into a large bed-room, attached to which is a dressing-room, fitted with water-closet and fixed lavatory supplied with hot and cold water. Then there is another principal bedroom, a superior bath-room supplied with capital plunge and shower baths, hot and cold water apparatus, and water closet; a chambermaid's closet, and a secondary bedroom. On the second floor are seven sleeping apartments, dressing room, chambermaid's and linen closets, and two water-closets. In the tower is a good bedroom, and in the attics hot and cold water cisterns, and abundant storage room, while at the north-west angle a flagstaff turret is fitted up as an observatory. In the basement, which is well lighted and thoroughly ventilated ... are the servant's hall, housekeeper's room, a large cooking kitchen with most complete and costly fittings, a scullery, good larders and pantries, a boot-house, washhouse, wine, ale, coal and bottle cellars, water-closet and area opening into the enclosed yard. All the bedrooms are fitted with vein marble mantelpieces, and in many instances with dress closets ... The painting and decoration, too, form a noteworthy feature. (Note: The interior painting and decoration of Belvedere was undescribed) The remainder of the estate consists of a small but tasteful flower garden, a paved yard, and a large kitchen garden, enclosed by very substantial stone walls relieved with sunk panels. [There is] adjoining stabling for 13 horses, four coach houses, two loose boxes, saddle and men's rooms, hay chambers, and a cottage.

== Death ==
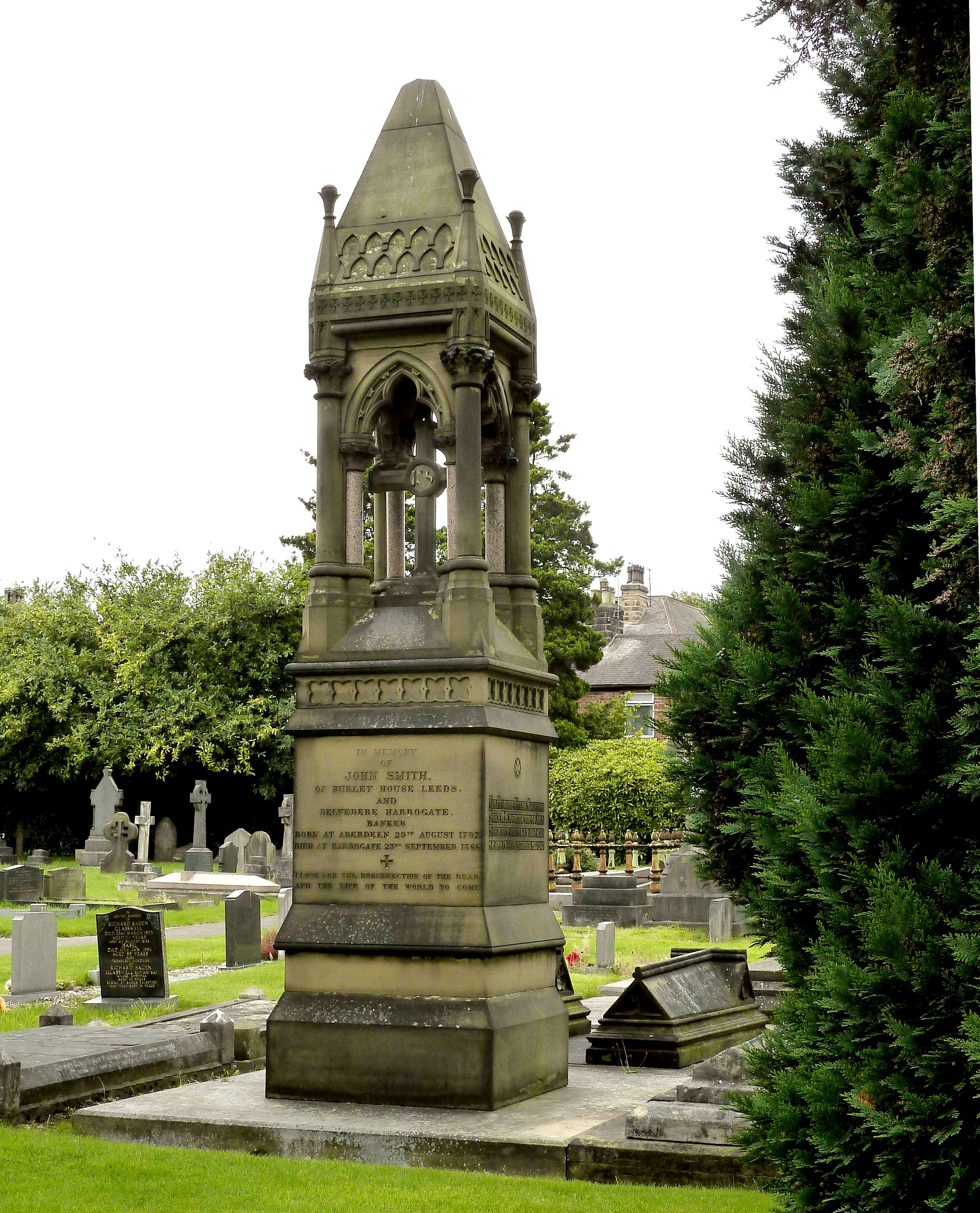
Smith's grave monument

During the last two years of his life, Smith suffered "a repetition of severe attacks" of illness, and spent much time at home in Belvedere. His health gave "great anxiety" to his family and friends. He had a "strong constitution" and would occasionally rally, but following his long illness, Smith died at Harrogate on 23 September 1866.

Smith's funeral took place at Harrogate on 28 September 1866, when a special train was run from Leeds railway station to Harrogate, for the large number of mourners expected.

Smith's will was proved on 28 November 1966. He left effects under £140,000 (equivalent to £14,407,964 in 2025).
