= Belvedere House =

Belvedere House may mean:

- Belvedere House and Gardens, a famous country house in county Westmeath, Ireland
- Belvedere House, Erith, London
- Belvedere House, Harrogate, North Yorkshire in England
- Belvedere House on Belvedere Estate, a house in Calcutta, India that housed government officials in the colonial era
- Belvidere House, original of Belvidere Hospital, Glasgow
- Belvedere House (Dublin), a townhouse in Dublin, Ireland
