= Highland Mary =

1792 song by Robert Burns

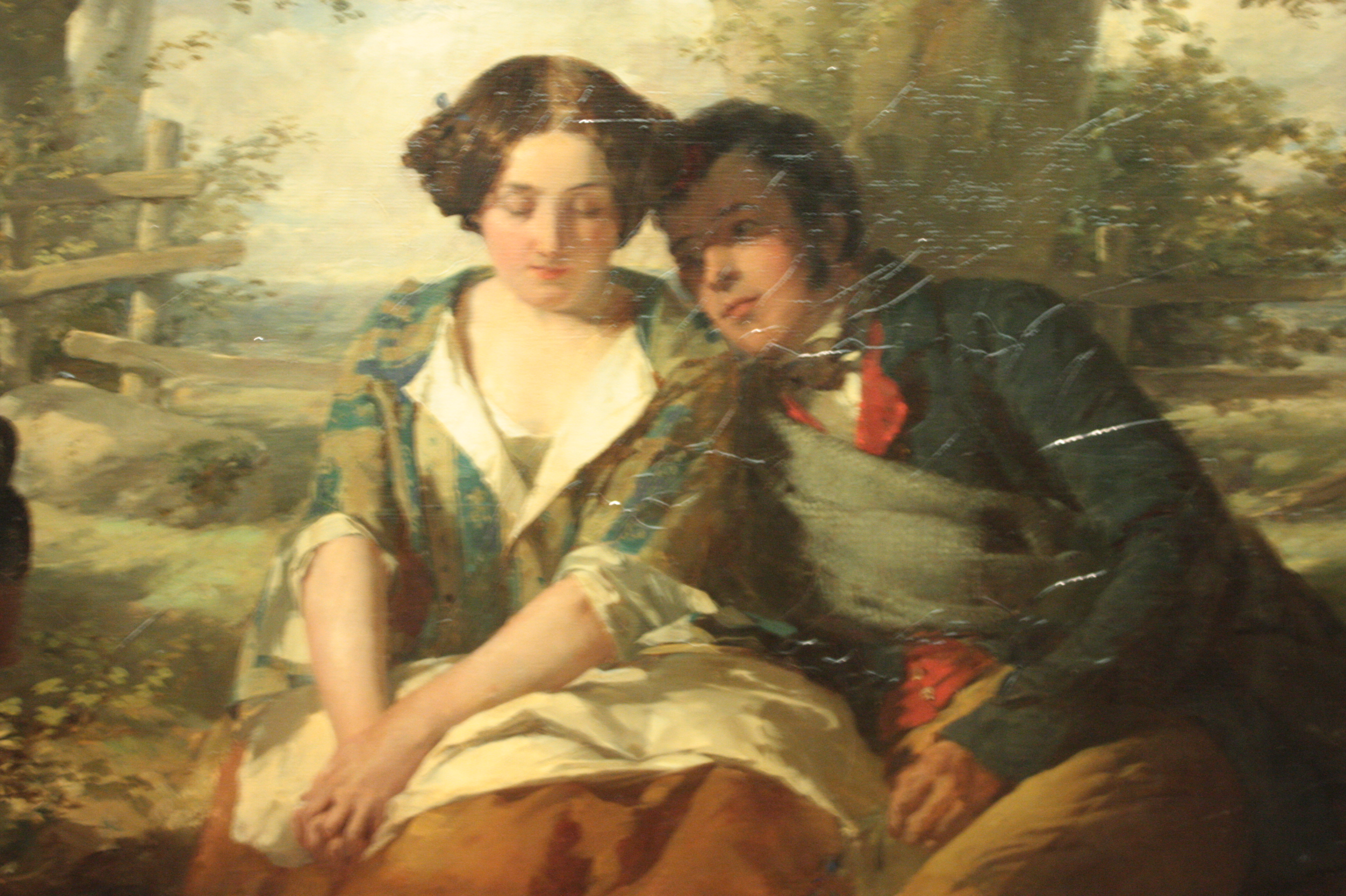
Burns and Highland Mary by Thomas Faed c.1850

Highland Mary is a song composed in 1792 by Scottish poet Robert Burns. It is one of three works dedicated to Mary Campbell, with whom Burns was in love in the 1780s. The others, "Highland Lassie, O" and "Will Ye Go to the Indies My Mary?", were composed in 1786. "Highland Mary" consists of four stanzas that speak of Burns's affection for the lady, his melancholy at her death and his continued memory of her. The melody was that of "Katherine Ogie."

== The poem ==
Ye banks, and braes, and streams around
The castle o' Montgomery,
Green be your woods, and fair your flowers,
Your waters never drumlie!
There Simmer first unfald her robes,
And there the langest tarry:
For there I took the last Fareweel
O' my sweet Highland Mary.

How sweetly bloom'd the gay, green birk,
How rich the hawthorn's blossom;
As underneath their fragrant shade,
I clasp'd her to my bosom!
The golden Hours, on angel wings,
Flew o'er me and my Dearie;
For dear to me as light and life
Was my sweet Highland Mary.

Wi' mony a vow, and lock'd embrace,
Our parting was fu' tender;
And pledging aft to meet again,
We tore oursels asunder:
But Oh! fell Death's untimely frost,
That nipt my Flower sae early!
Now green's the sod, and cauld's the clay,
That wraps my Highland Mary!

O pale, pale now, those rosy lips,
I aft hae kiss'd sae fondly!
And clos'd for ay the sparkling glance,
That dwalt on me sae kindly!
And mouldering now in silent dust,
That heart that lo'ed me dearly!
But still within my bosom's core
Shall live my Highland Mary.

== Description ==
In the poem, the speaker describes the natural scenery around Montgomery Castle, where the two met. The text details their final meeting, during which they promised to see each other again.

However, the poem later explains that Mary died unexpectedly at a young age. The speaker describes his feelings of loss and notes that while she is buried in the ground, he will continue to remember her.

== Gallery ==
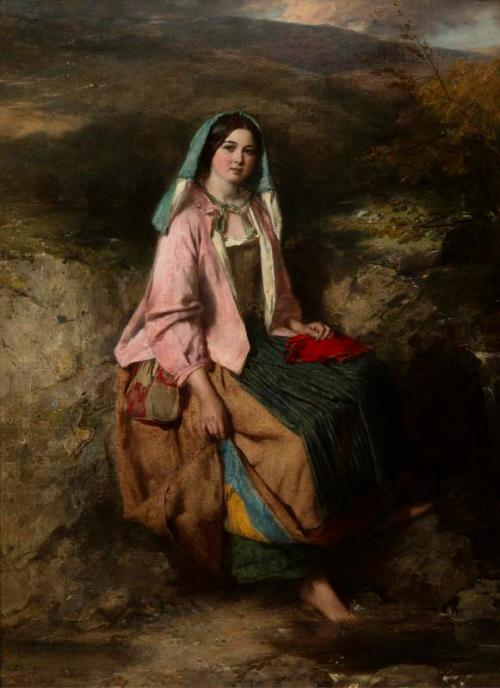
Highland Mary by Thomas Faed (1857), Aberdeen Art Gallery

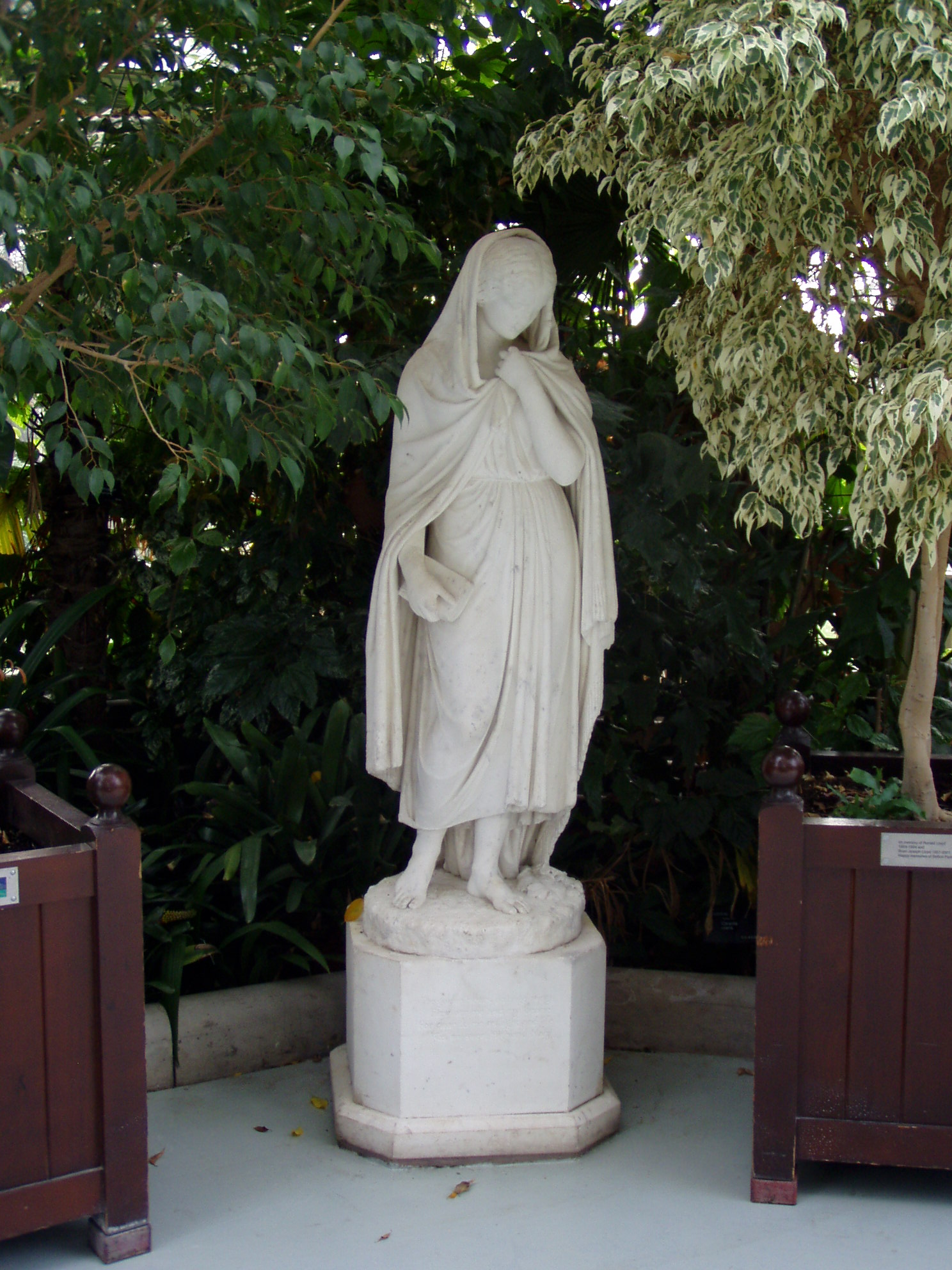
Highland Mary marble by Benjamin Spence (1850) inside the Palm House at Sefton Park, Liverpool

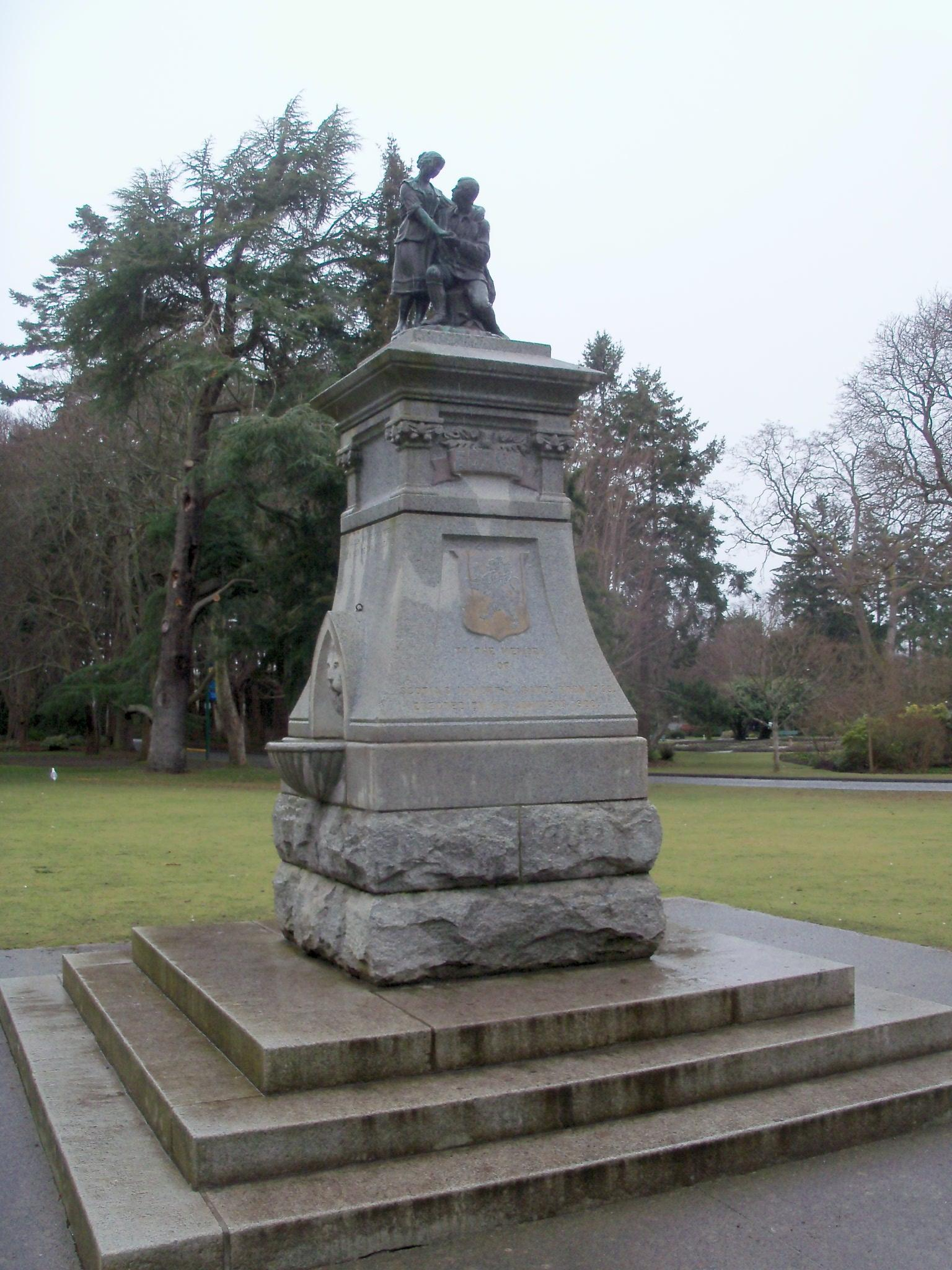
Robert Burns monument by Hamilton MacCarthy, Beacon Hill Park, Victoria, British Columbia, Canada, referencing an embraced Highland Mary

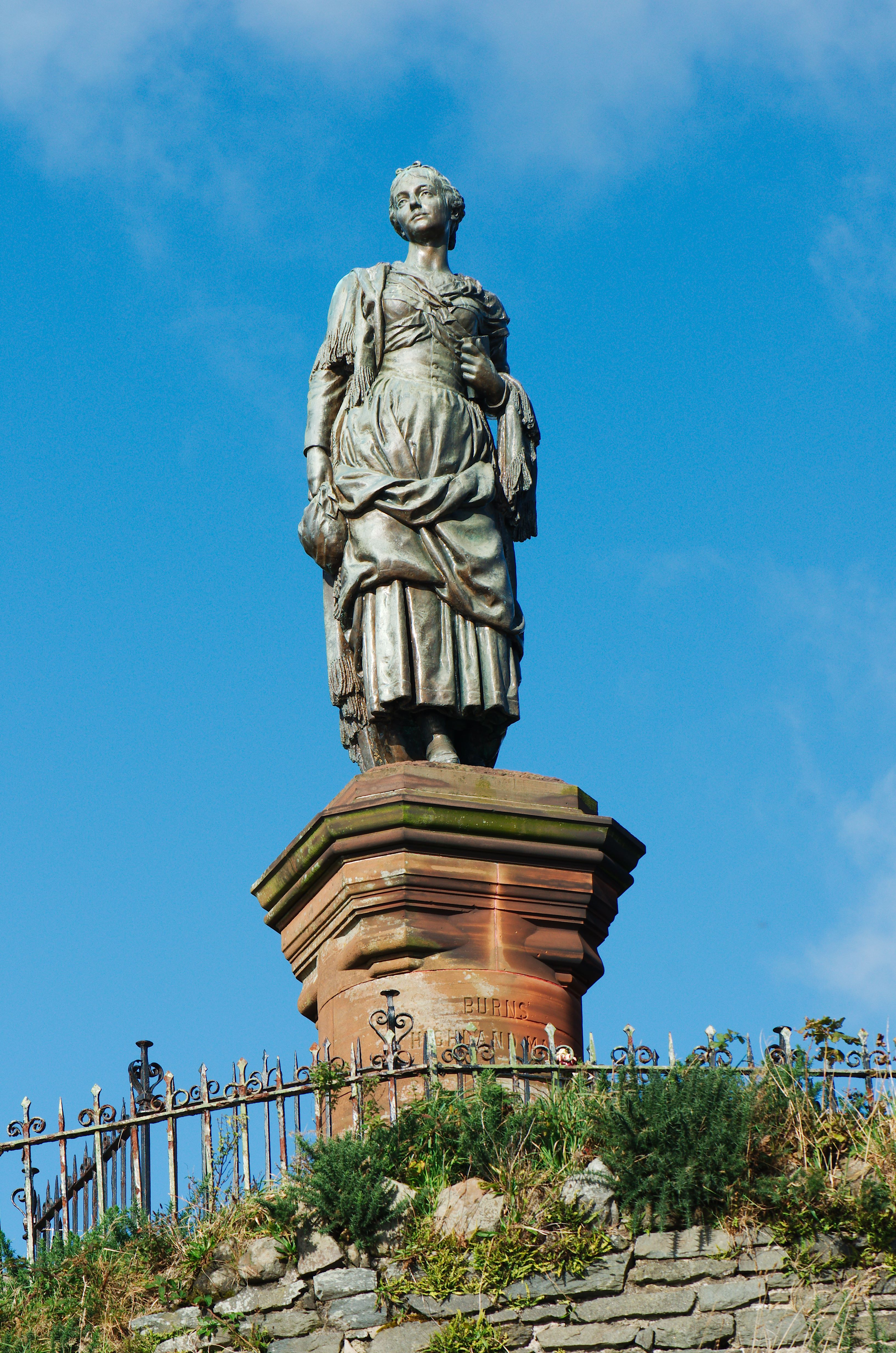
Highland Mary bronze by David Watson Stevenson (1896), in Dunoon, Scotland
