= Richard James Wyatt =

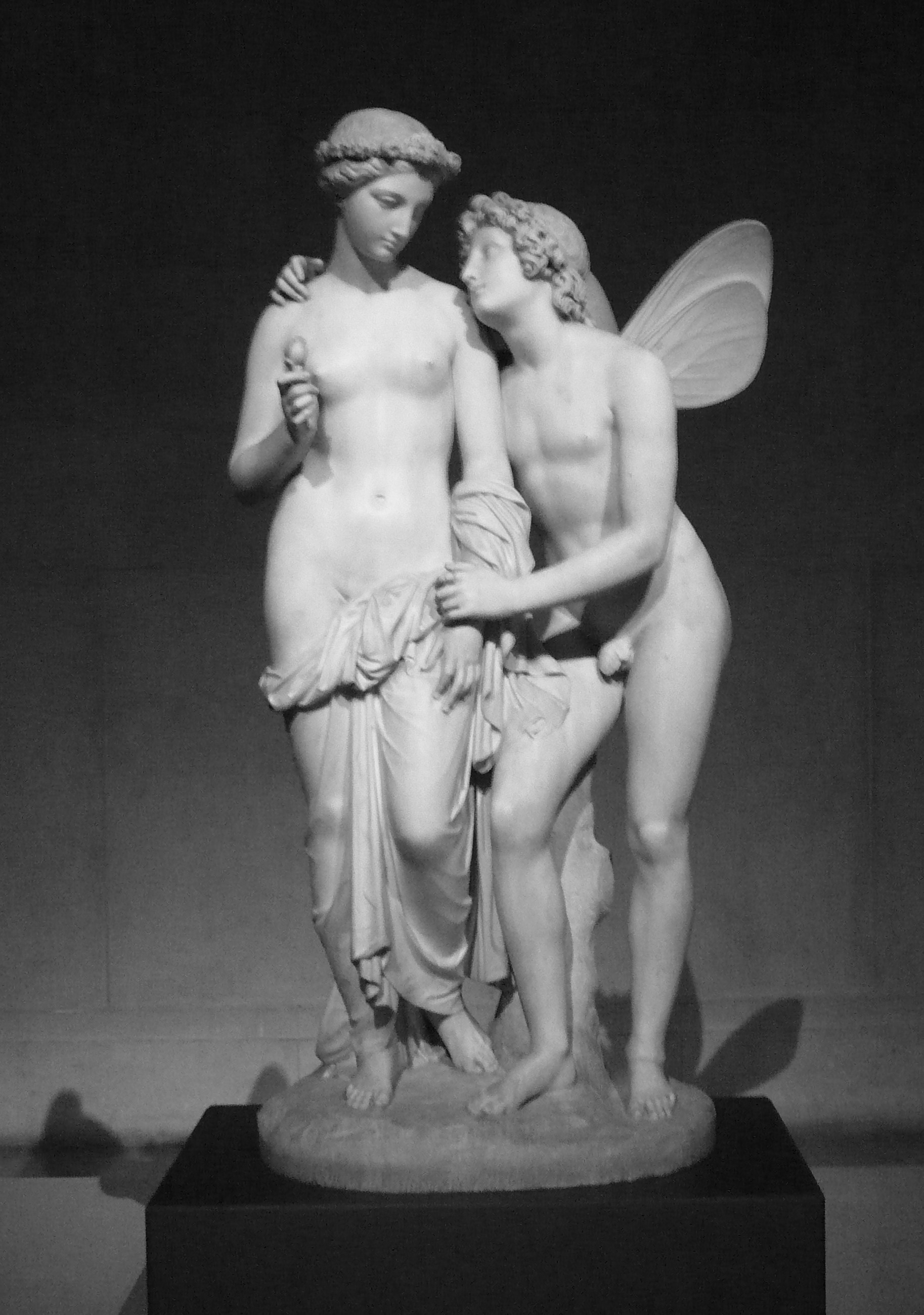
'Flora and Zephyr' 1834 by Richard James Wyatt, held at Nostell Priory

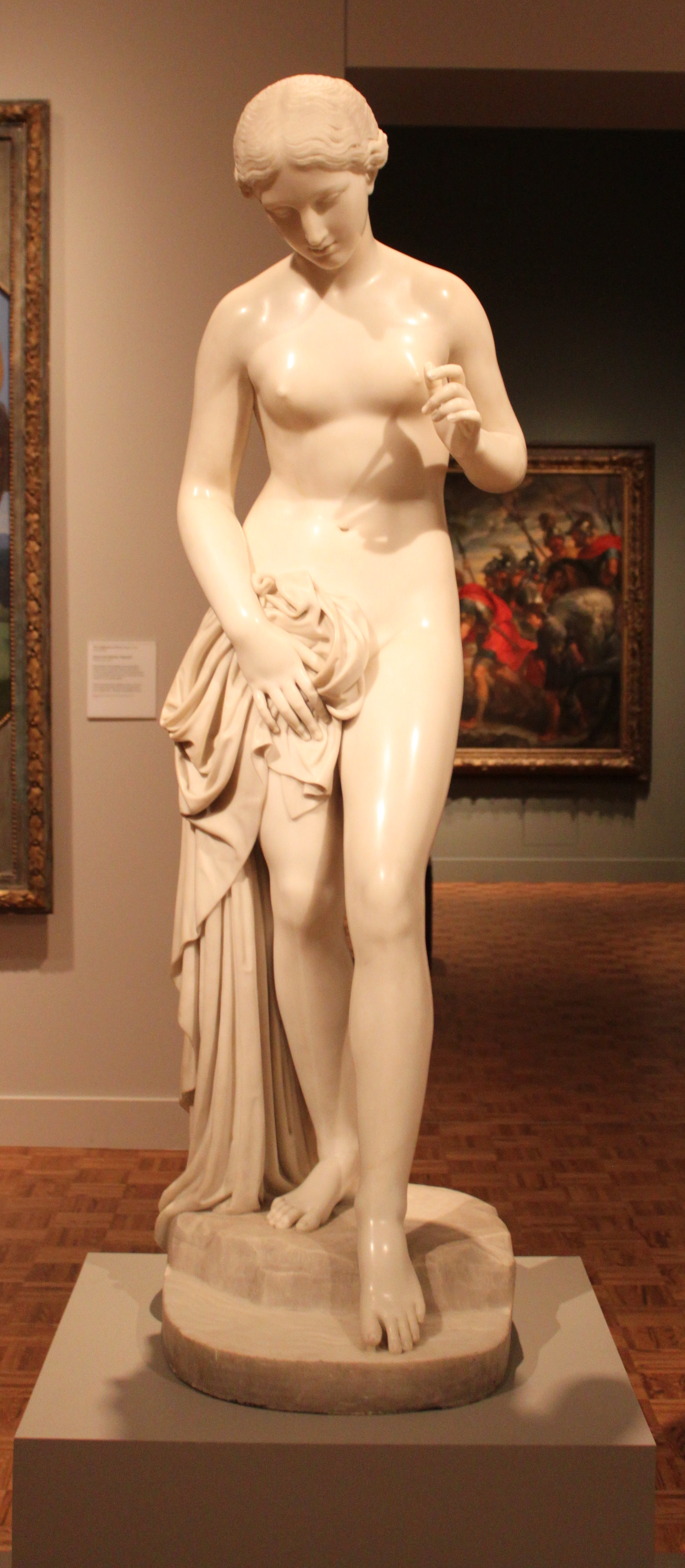
Girl Bathing,1830–35, marble, The Detroit Institute of Arts

Richard James Wyatt (6 June 1795 (baptised) – May 1850) was a sculptor. He was the grandson of the architect James Wyatt. Wyatt studied in Rome under Canova, and was a fellow student of John Gibson (sculptor). He was a man of classical tastes, and produced a number of exquisitely modelled, especially female, figures.

== Life ==
Wyatt was born in London, the son of Edward Wyatt (1757–1833) and his wife, Anne Maddox. He was baptised at St James, Middlesex. He studied at the Royal Academy Schools, where he gained two medals, and served his apprenticeship with John Charles Felix Rossi.

In 1818 he exhibited at the Royal Academy a piece entitled the Judgment of Paris, and in 1819 a monument to Lady Anne Hudson; other early memorial works by him are in Esher church and St. John's Wood chapel. When Canova visited this country Wyatt was brought under his notice by Sir Thomas Lawrence, and received from him an invitation to Rome. He left England early in 1821, and, after studying for a few months in Paris under Bosio, proceeded to Rome, and entered the studio of Canova, where he had John Gibson (1790–1866) as a fellow pupil.

Settling permanently in Rome, Wyatt practised his profession there with great enthusiasm and success, and from 1831 until his death was a frequent exhibitor at the Royal Academy. Among his best works were Ino and the infant Bacchus, Girl at the Bath, Musidora (at Chatsworth), and Penelope, The Huntress, and Flora (all in the royal collection). Several of these have been engraved for The Art Journal. The ‘Penelope’ was a commission given by the queen to Wyatt at the time of his only visit to England in 1841. Wyatt was a highly accomplished artist, particularly excelling in his female figures, which in purity of form and beauty of line rivalled those of his master Canova. A woodcut portrait, from a drawing by S. Pearce, accompanies a memoir of him in The Art Journal, published in 1850.

Versions of his Ino and the infant Bacchus are at the Fitzwilliam Museum, Cambridge and another formerly at County Hall Chester.

== Personal ==
Wyatt was the son of Edward Wyatt (1757–1833), a well-known carver and gilder of Oxford Street, by his wife Anne Madox, and cousin of Matthew Cotes Wyatt, was born in Oxford Street, London, on 3 May 1795. His whole life was otherwise passed in Rome, where he died, unmarried, on 29 May 1850, and was buried in the Protestant Cemetery, Rome. The monument was carved by his friend Benjamin Edward Spence.

Some of his works were shown at the London exhibition of 1851, and were awarded a gold medal.
