= Burley, Leeds =

Area of Leeds, West Yorkshire, England

Coordinates: 53.8062°N 1.5747°W

Burley
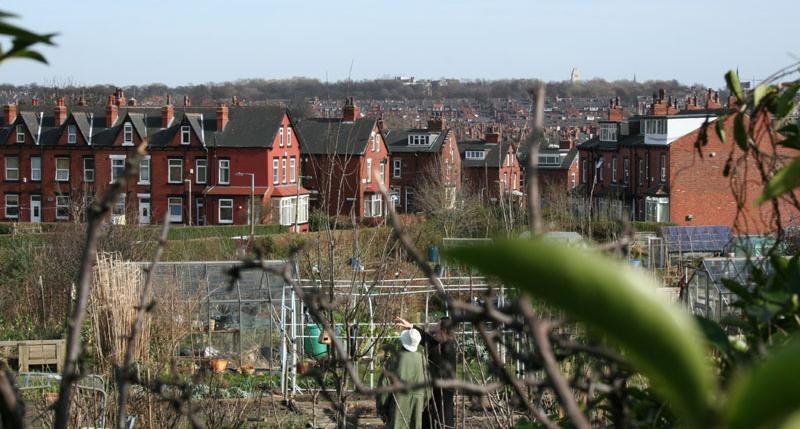
- Looking east over Burley Model Allotments towards the University of Leeds

- Location within West Yorkshire
- OS grid reference: SE279351
  - London: 170 mi (270 km) SSE
- Metropolitan borough: City of Leeds
- Metropolitan county: West Yorkshire
- Region: Yorkshire and the Humber
- Country: England
- Sovereign state: United Kingdom
- Post town: LEEDS
- Postcode district: LS3, LS4, LS6
- Dialling code: 0113
- Police: West Yorkshire
- Fire: West Yorkshire
- Ambulance: Yorkshire
- UK Parliament: Leeds Central and Headingley

Burley is an inner city area of Leeds, West Yorkshire, England, 1 mile (1.6 km) north-west of Leeds city centre, between the A65 Kirkstall Road at the south and Headingley at the north, in the Kirkstall ward.

== Etymology ==
The name is first attested in 1195 as "Burteg" and, around 1200, as "Burcheleia" which is more representative of other medieval attestations. The name derives from Old English burh, a 'fortification' and lēah an 'open space in woodland'.

== History ==
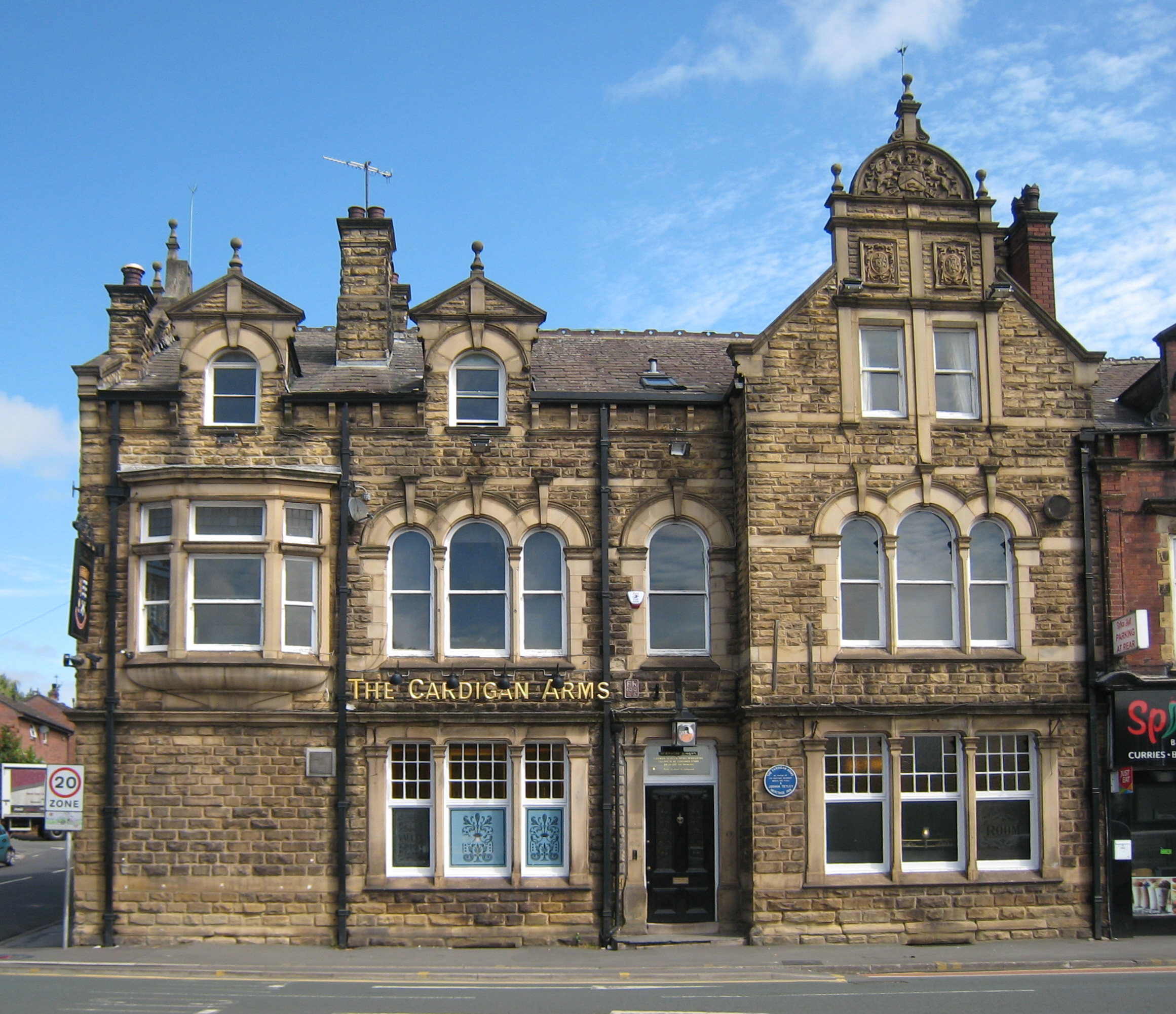
Cardigan Arms

Burley grew from a village in the late Industrial Revolution, and there are several streets including the word 'village' including The Village Street. The area from The Village Street in the west to the railway line in the east, and north of Burley Road forms the Village Conservation Area. Parts of the original village can still be seen at the junction of Burley Road and Haddon Road, and around Burley Lodge. Most houses constructed in Burley were of red-brick, but were generally smaller and largely back-to-backs. Industrial and commercial buildings were also largely brick-built. There are some larger stone-built buildings on Kirkstall Road such as the ornate Cardigan Arms public house—although this largely pre-dates most of the buildings in the area—which at the time of its construction only Burley Village existed, with the Arms somewhat outside.

Mills along the River Aire were built towards the end of the 19th century, some of which remain standing. Housing for mill workers and others in surrounding areas followed, and homes were built further up the bank. Other industries in the area included printing, clock-making, dairies and chemicals.

Before 1904, local government was handled by the civil parish of Headingley-cum-Burley. Thereafter, the area was incorporated into the parish of Leeds. The ecclesiastical parish of Burley still exists. The boundaries of the ecclesiastical parish are very close to those of the postcode area LS4, so LS4 is often used as an indicator of being in Burley, although LS4 also includes a small area that is in the ecclesiastical parish of Kirkstall.

The area remained working class for many decades but the growth of the University of Leeds and Leeds Metropolitan University in the late 20th century brought a growing student population to Burley and the surrounding areas of Hyde Park, and Headingley. In the mid- to late 2000s student halls were built along the lower parts of Burley Road.

The opening of the Leeds Studios in 1968 by Yorkshire Television provided the first major non-manufacturing employer. ITV Yorkshire, Hits Radio West Yorkshire and Greatest Hits Radio West Yorkshire broadcast studios, and the Home Office's Immigration offices, are on Kirkstall Road in Burley.

== Community ==
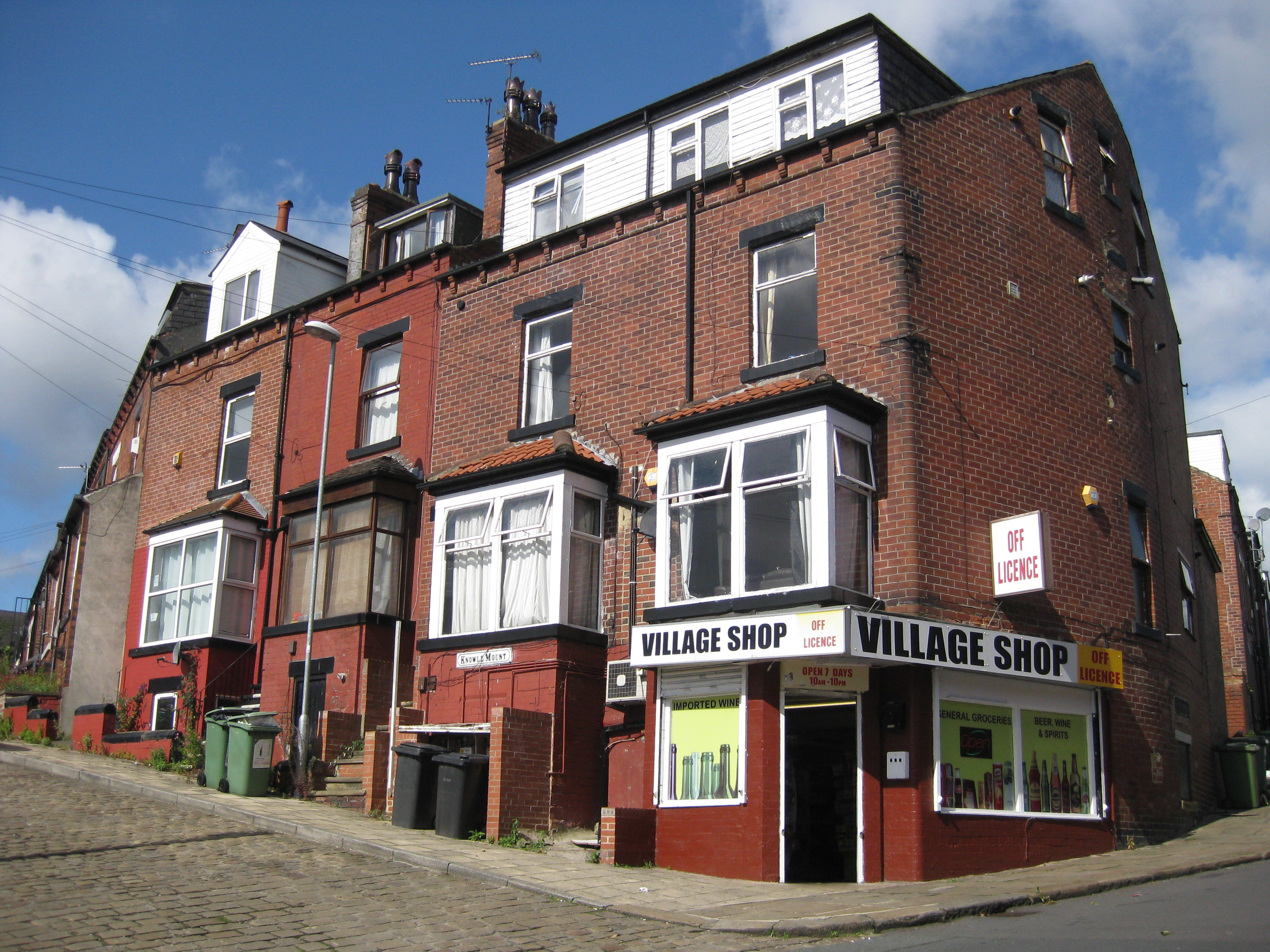
Village Shop

St Matthias' Church is situated to the south-east of the old village. Built in 1854, it is a stone church with spire, and was designated a Grade II listed building on 5 August 1976. St. Simon's Church, funded by Edmund Denison-Beckett MP, was located on Ventnor Street but was closed as part of a clearance scheme in the 1960s.

Burley public houses and members' clubs include The Cardigan Arms, Bridgewater Arms, The Merry Monk (now closed), New Burley Private Members Social Club and Burley Conservative Club. There are three gyms, a 5-aside football centre and a nine-hole golf course. Burley Branch Library was open on Cardigan Road between 1926 and 2016, closing due to the poor condition of the building.

The main shopping area is on Kirkstall Road and Burley Hill, where there are shops and restaurants. Cardigan Fields leisure park complex contains a multi-screen cinema, a nightclub, a gymnasium, a 10-pin Bowling, a public house, and a supermarket.

The Leeds and Liverpool Canal and River Aire form Burley's southern boundary, and are popular with walkers, cyclists and fishermen.

Burley Model Allotments, in what was once a quarry, has more than 100 plots and is bisected by Beechwood Crescent. The allotments have existed since 26 August 1892 when Leeds City Council acquired the site. It was replanned in 1956 and 1957 and on 26 June 1958 they were re-opened as Burley Model Allotments by the Lord Mayor of Leeds.

Local artists open their homes as galleries to display their work as part of Triangle Art Day.

=== Housing ===
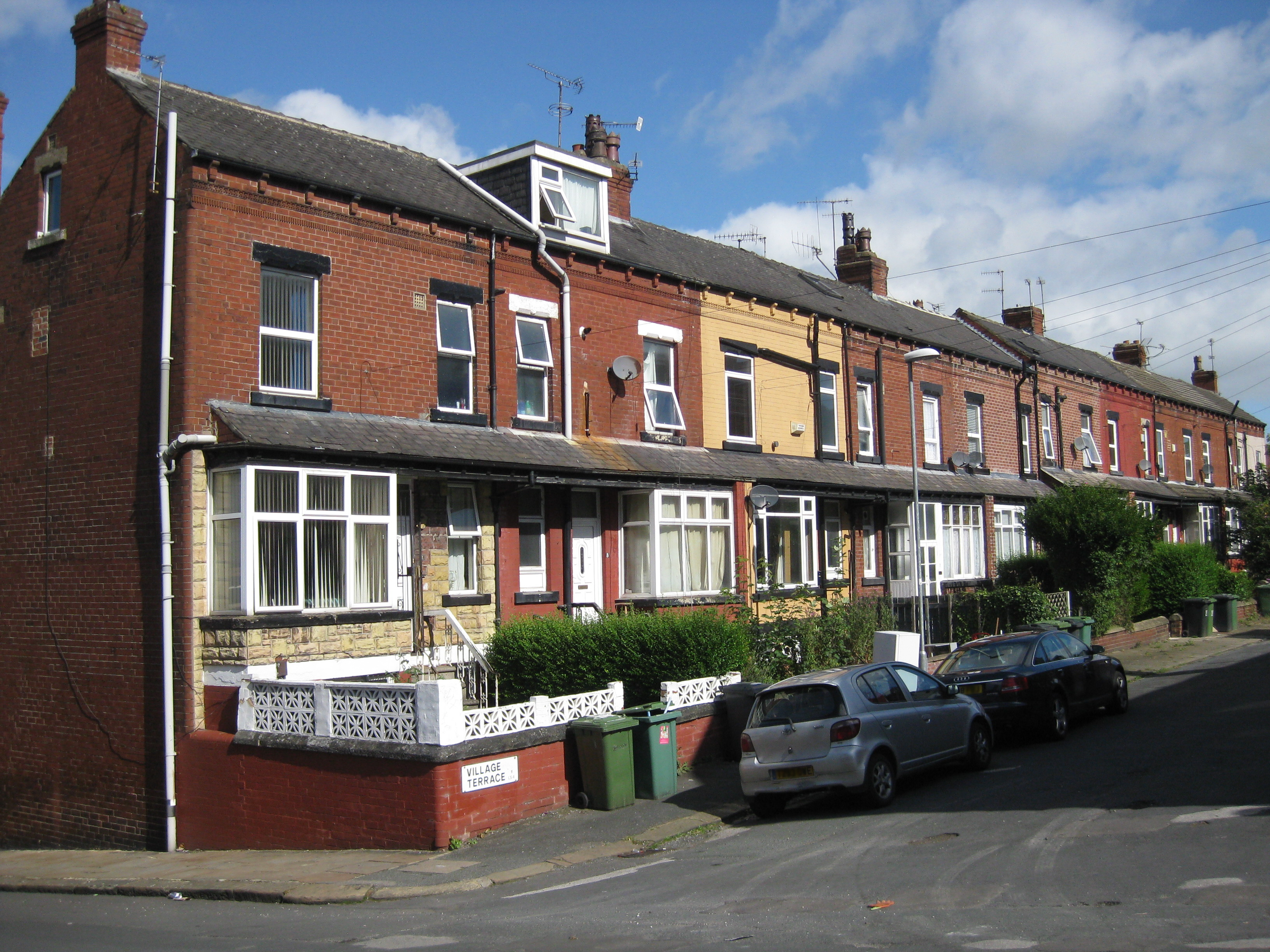
Village Terrace

Burley is characterised by red brick Victorian terraces including small back-to-back houses and through terraces. In the 20th century private houses were built including semi-detached houses around the Burley Wood. There are pockets of 20th-century council houses including a small estate of prefabricated concrete houses on Burley Road near the Yorkshire Television studios and an estate closer to Kirkstall.

Burley has a student population in private rented accommodation and in the mid- to late 2000s large scale student halls were built on Burley Road such as the former Opal Group now owned by CLV, Parklane Triangle, Unite Students and Iconinc.

== Transport ==
Burley is linked to Leeds city centre by the A65 and Burley Roads. The railway came to Burley with the opening of the Harrogate Line in 1848 but Burley Park railway station was only opened in 1988; until then the nearest station was Headingley railway station. The station connects Burley with the city centre, Headingley, Horsforth, Harrogate, Knaresborough and York. First Leeds' 15, 19, 19A, 33, 34, 49, 50 and 50A bus services link Burley with the city centre, Bradford, Farsley, Horsforth, Ireland Wood, Tinshill, Kirkstall, Headingley, Bramley, Garforth, Guiseley, Menston, Otley, St James' Hospital and Seacroft. Until 1959 the Leeds Tramway ran through Burley.

== Sport ==
Queens ARLFC play in the Pennine League Premier Division and have headquarters at Burley Social Club. Burley United play their games at West Park football fields, playing in Division 1 of the Sunday League. Burley RUFC play in Yorkshire Division 3 and play their matches next to Kirkstall Abbey.

== Filmography ==
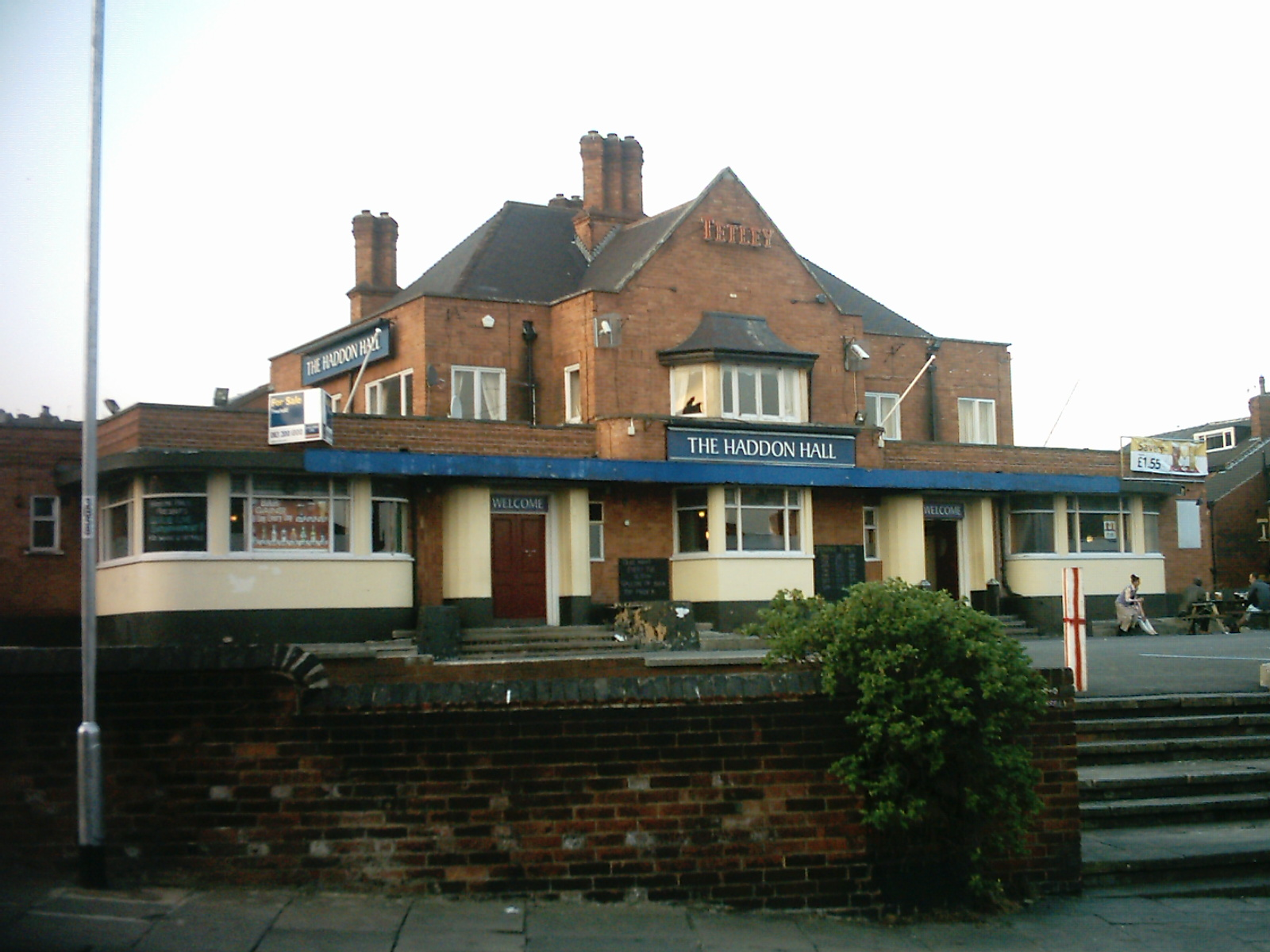
The Haddon Hall public house in Burley was used for the filming of The Beiderbecke Tapes.

Burley was the setting for the television drama Harry's Game, in which an estate (since demolished) in Burley stood in for Belfast. The Haddon Hall public house was used for filming in The Beiderbecke Tapes. Burley Park railway station is sometimes used as Hotton railway station in Yorkshire Television soap opera Emmerdale. Occasional scenes from Fat Friends were shot in Burley.

== Notable people ==
- James Jepson Binns, pipe organ builder
- Mel B (aka Scary Spice) from the girl band the Spice Girls, born in Harehills in 1975 and grew up in Burley
- Andrew Eldritch (born Andrew William Harvey Taylor), vocalist for the Sisters of Mercy, lived at 7 Village Place in the 1980s
- Emma Mackey, actress known for her role as Maeve Wiley on Sex Education, lived in a house on Burley Road while attending the University of Leeds
- Gary Marx (born Mark Frederick Pearman), founding guitarist for the Sisters of Mercy, lived at 7 Village Place in the 1980s
- Jimmy Savile, English media personality, born in Burley
- John Smith (1797–1866), philanthropist, banker, and resident of Burley House, Burley 1841–1866

== See also ==
- Listed buildings in Leeds (Kirkstall Ward)
