= Jonathan Brooks (priest) =

English priest (1774–1855)

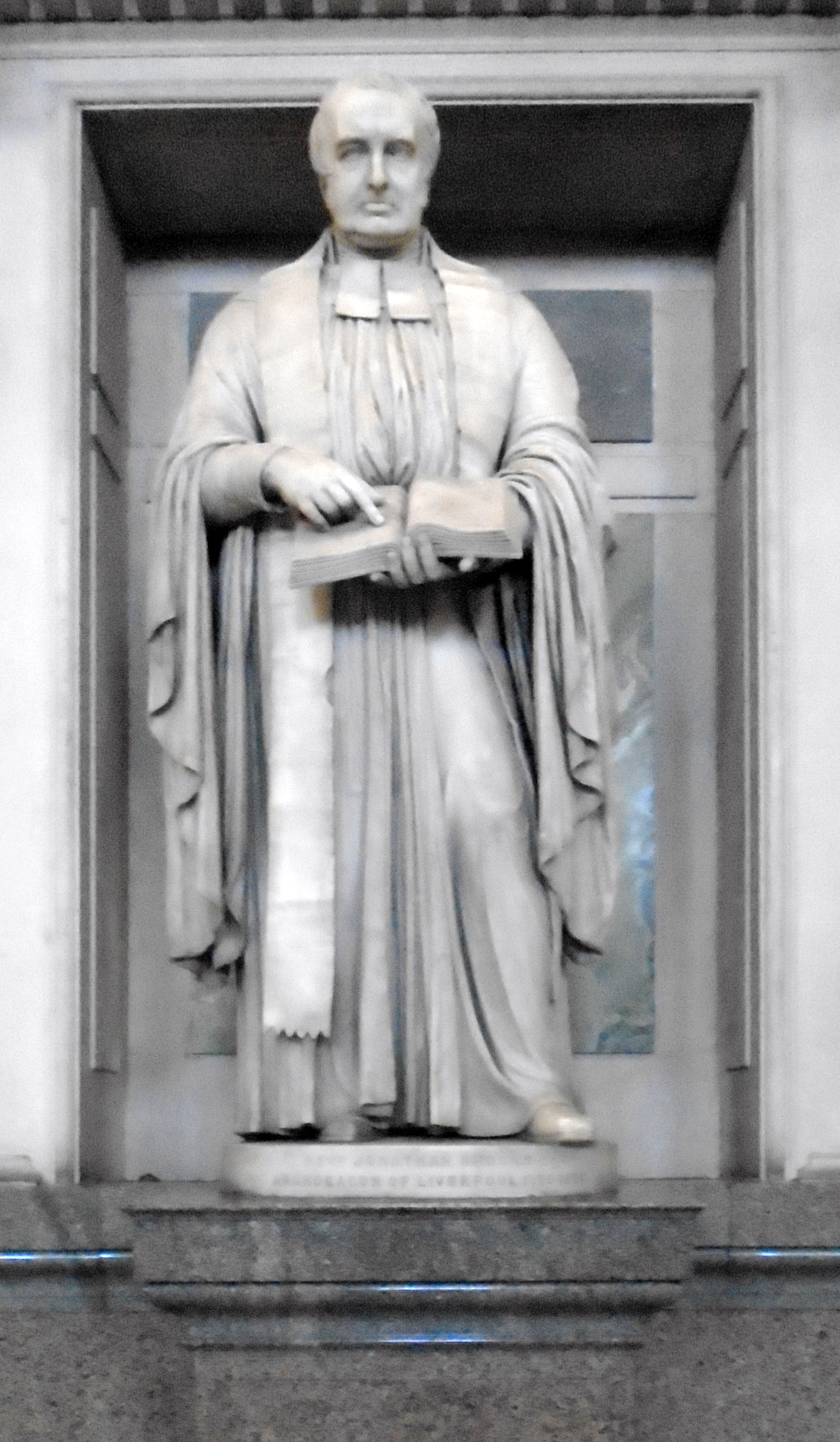
Statue of Rev. Jonathan Brooks

Jonathan Brooks(1774 - 1855) was the inaugural Archdeacon of Liverpool.

Brooks was educated at Trinity College, Cambridge. After curacies in Walton-on-the-Hill and Liverpool he was the Rector of St Nicholas Liverpool from 1828 to 1855; and Rural Dean of Warrington from 1850.

He died on 28 September 1855. There is a statue to him inside St George's Hall, Liverpool. The monument was carved by Benjamin Edward Spence.
