= St Matthias' Church, Burley =

St Matthias Church, Burley
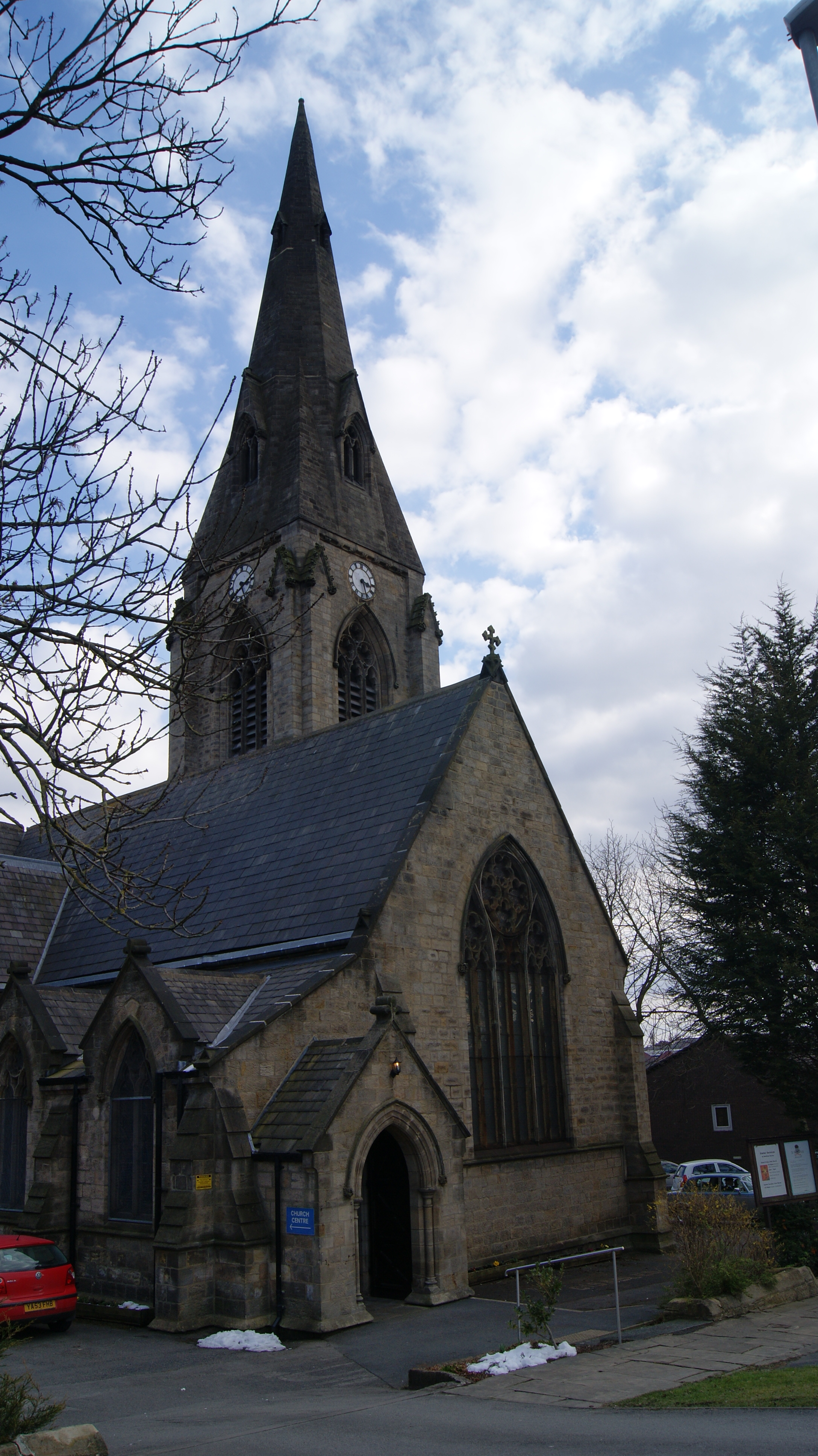
- St Matthias' Church, Burley
- St Matthias Church, Burley
- 53.806972°N 1.579264°W
- OS grid reference: SE 27813 34599
- Location: Burley, Leeds, West Yorkshire
- Country: England
- Denomination: Church of England

History
- Dedication: St Matthias

Administration
- Province: York
- Diocese: Ripon and Leeds
- Archdeaconry: Leeds

St Matthias' Church is an Anglican church in Burley, Leeds, West Yorkshire, England. The church was completed in 1854 and the north aisle and west porch were added in 1886. It is a Grade II* listed building.

== History ==
The church was funded by banker John Smith and its spire by William Beckett. The architects were the Leeds firm of Perkins & Backhouse, who also built St Peter's Bramley. Work began in 1853 by Headingley builder Thomas Moxon, while the church's woodwork and wood carving were crafted by Messrs Winn and Pawson. The font, tablet and all architectural sculpture were executed by Robert Mawer.

In 1886, alterations were made to increase its capacity from 450 to 650 to serve the growing population. Burley had undergone a significant expansion in the intervening years caused mainly by the Industrial Revolution and sale of land for building to the south and west of the church by the Earl of Cardigan.

=== Present day ===
St Matthias' Church stands in the Charismatic tradition of the Church of England.

In the summer of 2018, Burley St Matthias merged with Riverside Church.

The resident bell-ringers are the Leeds University Union Society of Change Ringers.There is currently a ring of eight bells hung for full circle ringing, replacing a previous set of six bells cast by Taylor and Son of Loughborough. The previous peal of six originated as a peal of three cast in 1854, and were augmented to six one year later in 1855.

== See also ==
- Grade II* listed buildings in Leeds
- Listed buildings in Leeds (Kirkstall Ward)
