= Belvedere House, Harrogate =

Historic house in North Yorkshire, England

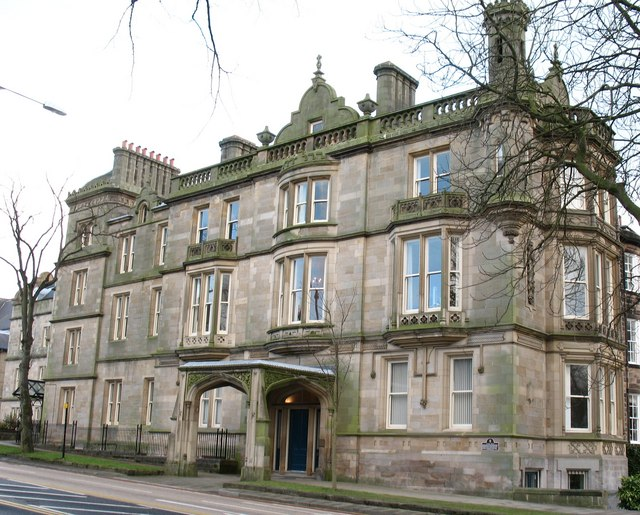
- Belvedere, in 2008

General information
- Architectural style: Gothic Revival
- Address: Victoria Avenue, Harrogate, North Yorkshire, England
- Coordinates: 53°59′25″N 1°32′26″W
- Year(s) built: 1861–1862
- Groundbreaking: 1860
- Owner: Built for John Smith

Design and construction
- Architecture firm: Perkin and Backhouse

Belvedere House, also known as Belvedere, is a historic building in Harrogate, a town in North Yorkshire, in England.

== History ==
The house was built between 1861 and 1862 for John Smith. It was designed by Perkin and Backhouse and constructed by Richard Ellis. It was originally named "Belvidere". Smith died in 1866, and the house was successively occupied by George E. Donisthorpe and Edmund Faber. In 1920, it was converted into a youth hostel by the Young Men's Christian Association. It later became an art school, and then offices. It has been grade II listed since 1975.

== Structure ==
The house is built of gritstone with string courses, a cornice, a pierced parapet and a hipped slate roof with a central Dutch gable. The original block has three storeys, three bays and a recessed bay on the left. On the right corner is an embattled tourelle. Projecting from the front is a porte-cochère with four-centred arches and decorated spandrels. Above the entrance is a two-storey segmental bow window, flanked by single-storey bay windows with quatrefoil pierced parapets and aprons. To the left is a four-storey belvedere with a decorative blocking course and an ogee roof, and further to the left is a recessed bay with a Dutch gable.

== See also ==
- Listed buildings in Harrogate (Low Harrogate Ward)
