= Benjamin Edward Spence =

English sculptor

Benjamin Edward Spence (1822–1866) was a 19th century English sculptor, who spent much of his professional life in Italy.

== Life ==
He was born in Liverpool in December 1822, the son of William Spence, a sculptor who later in life became a partner in a business house in Liverpool, and gave up the profession. In 1846 he was awarded the Heywood silver medal and a cash prize by the Royal Manchester Institution for a group in clay of the death of the Duke of York at the battle of Agincourt.

His father was persuaded by John Gibson to send Edward to Rome. There he entered the studio of Richard James Wyatt, and also received help from Gibson. He died at Livorno (then known as Leghorn) on 21 October 1866.

In 1870 Christie's auctioneers in London held a sale of his Italian studio works brought from Rome.

== Works ==
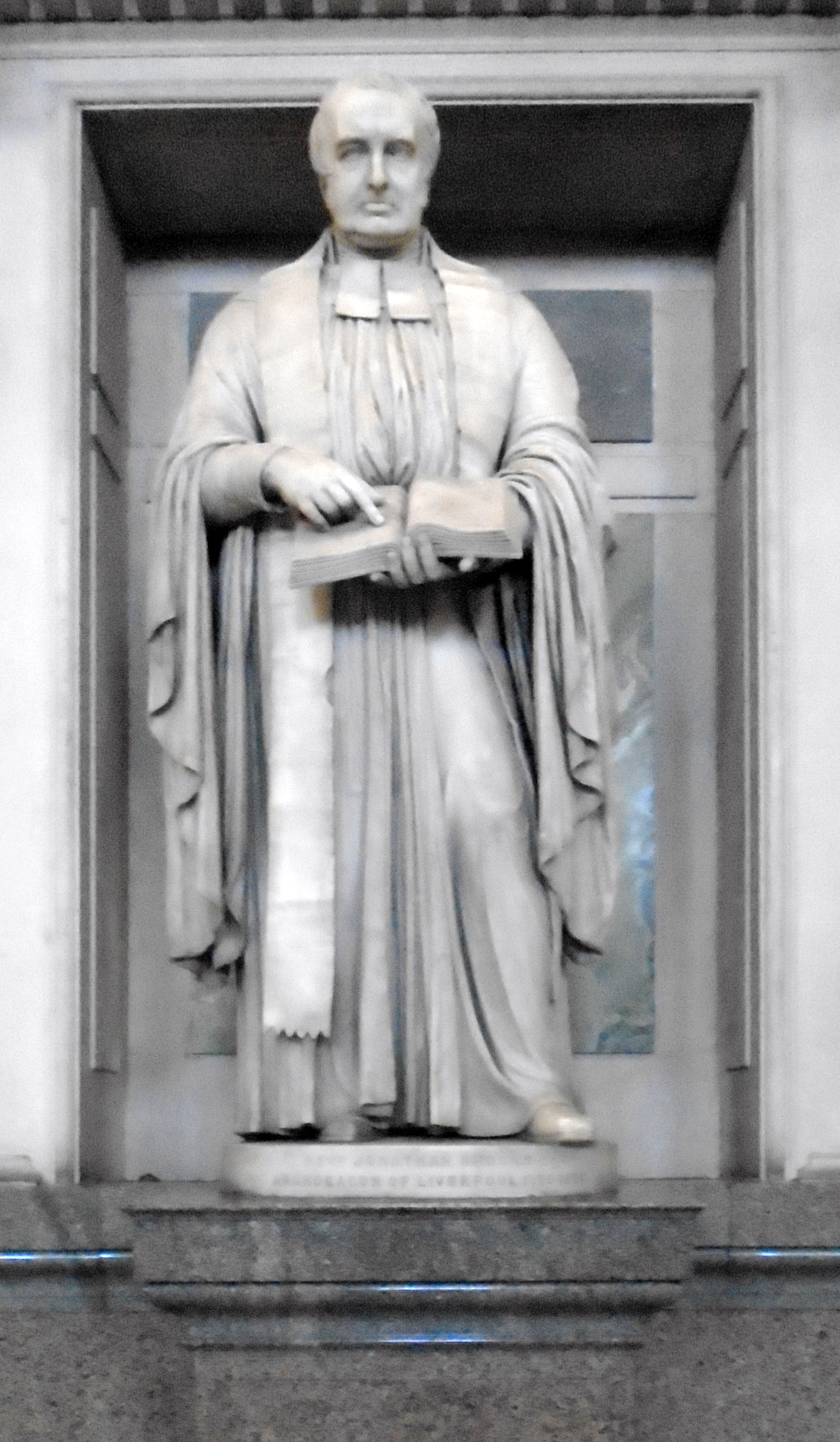
Statue of Rev. Jonathan Brooks

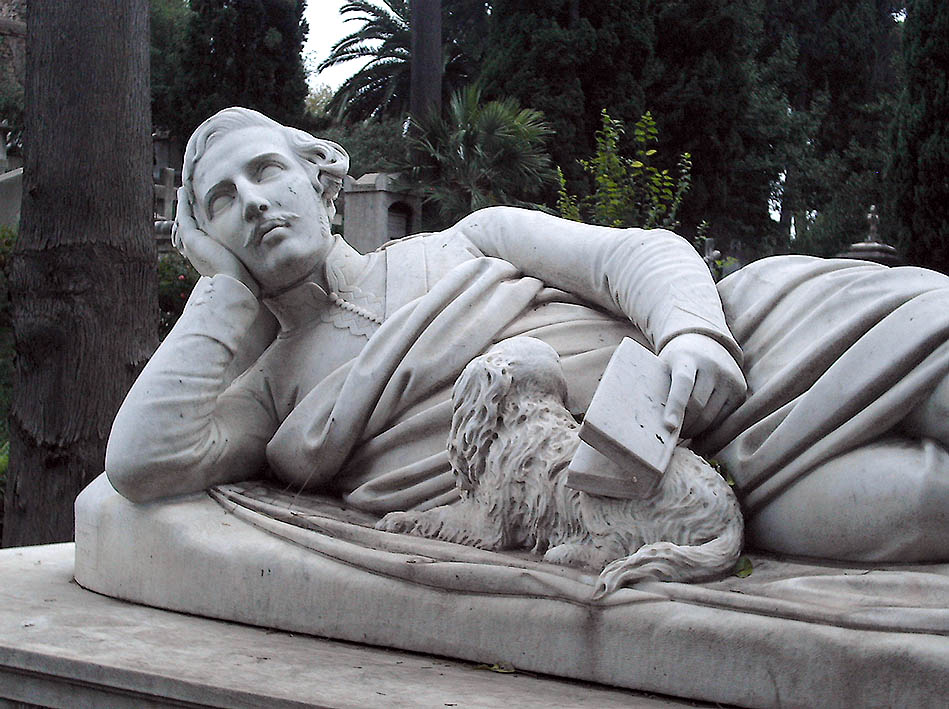
Benjamin Edward Spence, monument for the grave of Devereux Plantagenet Cockburn in the Protestant Cemetery, Rome

Between 1849 and 1867 Spence contributed to the exhibition of the Royal Academy five times: in 1850 with "Ophelia", in 1856 "Venus and Cupid", in 1861 "Hippolytus", and in 1867 "The Parting of Hector and Andromache". He contributed "Highland Mary" to the Exposition Universelle 1855, and two works, "Finding of Moses" and "Jeanie Deans before Queen Caroline", to the International Exhibition 1862. A number works of his that were not exhibited in England were engraved for the Art Journal.

- Statue of Lavinia for Mr Holmes of Liverpool (1849)
- Statue of Ophelia for Thomas Brassey MP (1850)
- Tomb of Richard James Wyatt in the Protestant Cemetery, Rome (1851)
- Highland Mary at Osborne House (1854)
- Bas relief in a monument to Ann Catherine Jane Smith (died 1854) in St Matthias' Church, Burley. (Note: See File:St Matthias' Church, Burley, Leeds (36678360583).jpg)
- Monument to Lt James Marshall in Leeds Parish Church (1855)
- Busts of Mr and Mrs Thomas Brassey, formerly at Normanhurst Court (dnk)
- Archdeacon Jonathan Brooks at St George's Hall, Liverpool (1856)
- Rebecca at the Well at Walker Art Gallery, Liverpool (1860)
- The Finding of Moses at the International Exhibition 1862
- Jeannie Deans before Queen Caroline at the International Exhibition 1862
- The Angel's Whisper for James Smith of Liverpool (1863)
- The Lady of the Lake for Balmoral Castle (1863)
- Virgin and Child, signed Rome 1865 (Archbishop's House, Roman Catholic Cathedral of Westminster)

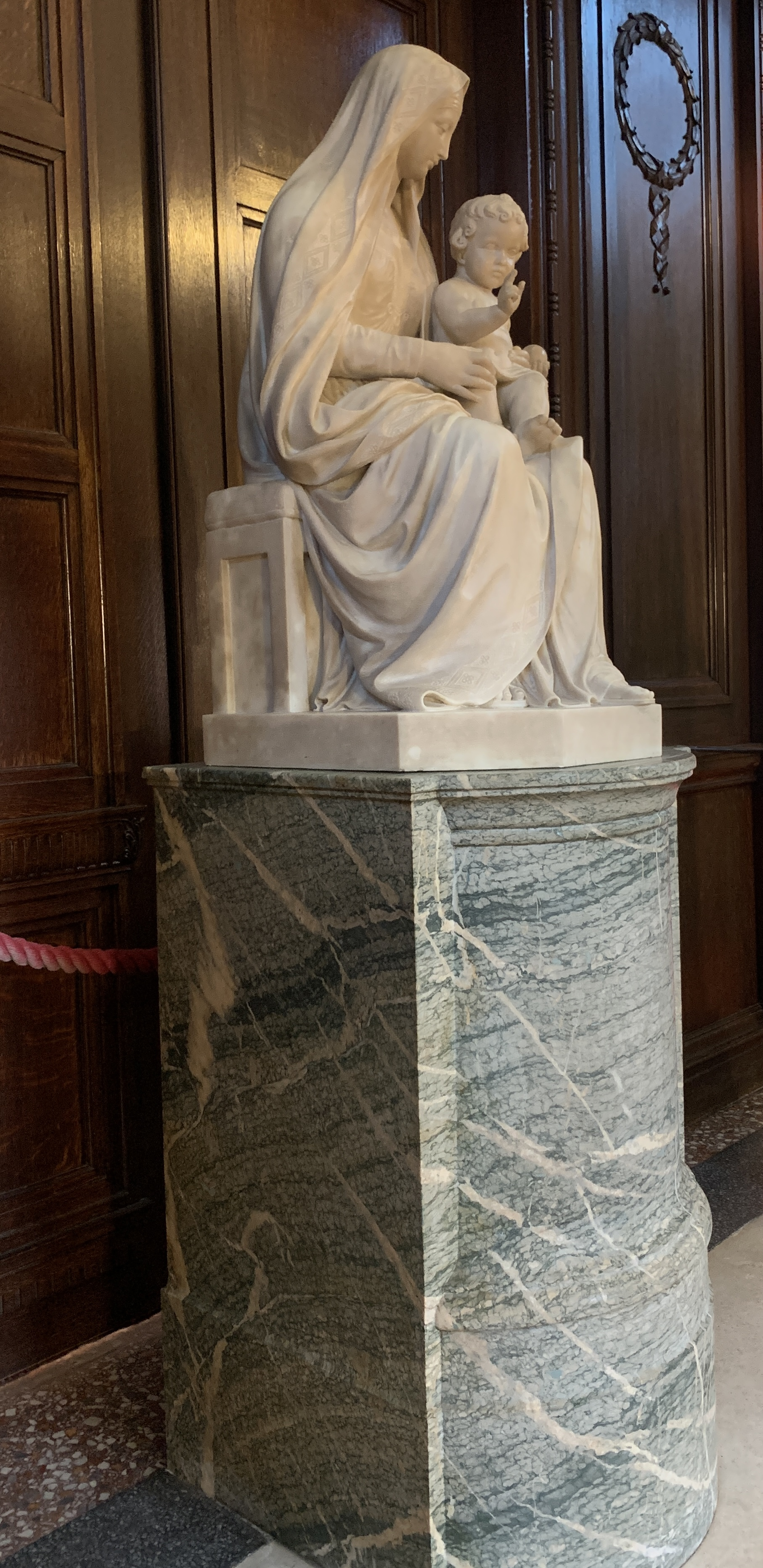
Virgin and Child, marble, 1865,

- Flora MacDonald at Stanley Park, Liverpool (dnk)
