= Elizabeth Wilhelmina Jones =

British educator (1869–1959)

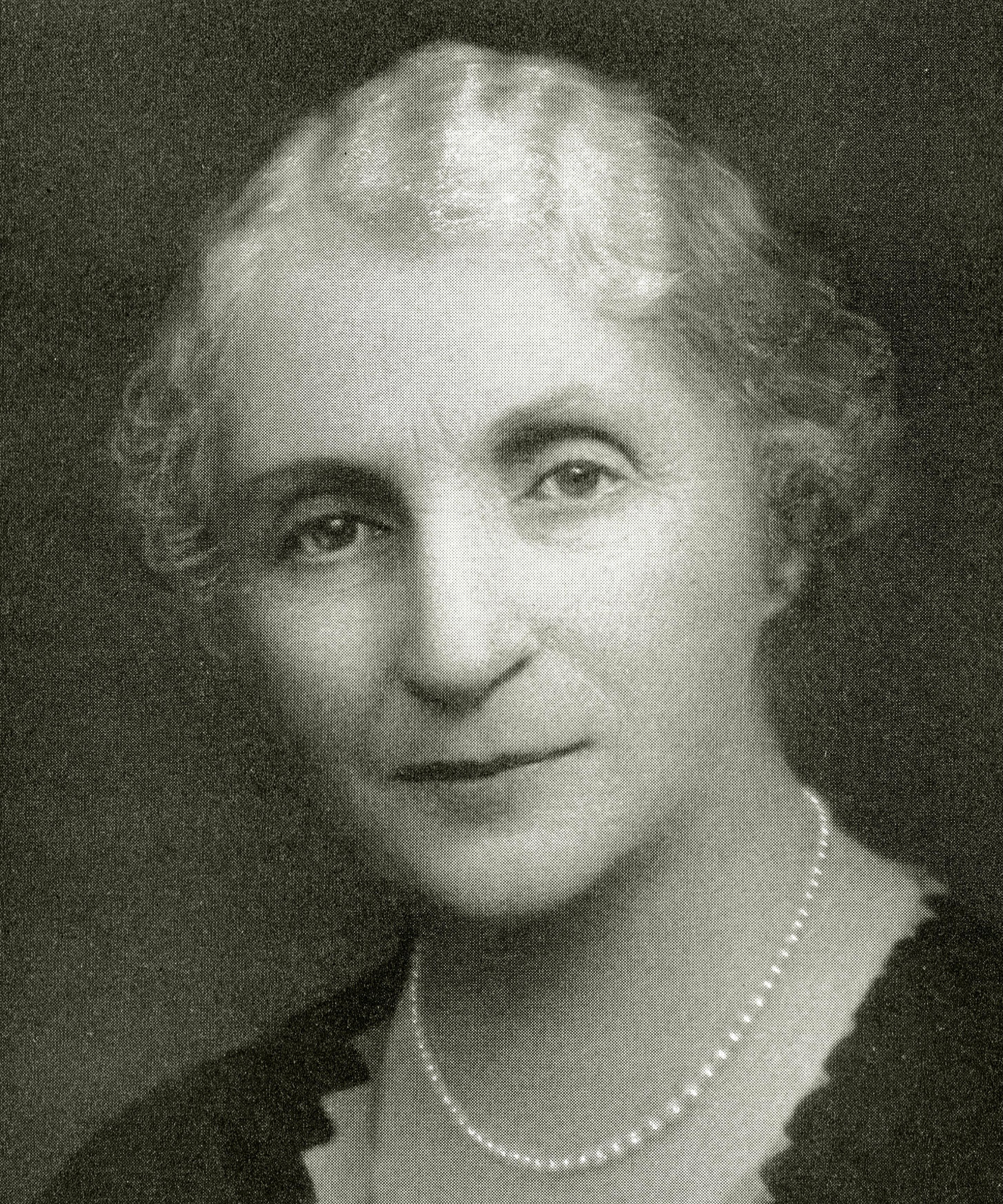
- Jones in 1934
- Born: 27 October 1869; Belfast, County Antrim, Ireland
- Died: 10 December 1959 (aged 90); Eastbourne, Sussex, England
- Other names: Miss M. E. Jones; Mina E. Jones
- Occupation: Head teacher
- Years active: 1894–1935
- Known for: Design, development and expansion of Harrogate Ladies' College, in collaboration with George Mearns Savery

Elizabeth Wilhelmina Jones (27 October 1869 – 10 December 1959), known professionally as Miss M. E. Jones or Mina E. Jones, was an Irish educator who was the headmistress of Harrogate Ladies' College in Harrogate, North Riding of Yorkshire, England, from 1898 to 1935.

Jones was born in Belfast, Ireland. In collaboration with the school's founder and owner, George Mearns Savery, a fellow Wesleyan, she increased the number of pupils, moved the establishment into a new, purpose-built building, and planned for the development of female education there. After Savery's early death she added a separate preparatory school for girls, rebuilt Harrogate's Old St Mary's Church on the school grounds as a chapel for the staff and pupils, and established Maison Blanche, a French-language school in Paris. The Northern Whig described her as "one of the leading educationists in England".

== Background ==
Jones was born into a Wesleyan family background. Her maternal grandfather was William Wilson of Crossan, County Tyrone, Ireland, (Note: William Wilson (Crossan 1799 – Crossan 10 January 1856).) who married Elizabeth Graham, (Note: Elizabeth Graham (Crossan 1807 – Fermanagh 27 May 1873).) also from Crossan, and had twelve children. (Note: The twelve children of William Wilson were: Reverend William Wilson (1831–1881), Sarah Wilson (1833–1914), Robert Wilson (1835–1885), Catherine Agnes Wilson (1837–1908), James Wilson (1838–1910), Mary Jane Wilson, mother of Elizabeth Wilhelmina Jones (1840–1918), Margaret Wilson (born 1842), Charles Graham Wentworth Wilson (1844–1926), Martha Wilson (born 1846), John Wilson (born 1848), Wesley George Wilson (Crossan 11 March 1850 – 4 October Queensland 1917). Elizabeth Lavinia Wilson (1853–1926).) The first of those siblings was Jones' uncle Reverend William Wilson, who emigrated to Australia in 1852 and became a Wesleyan minister. Her mother was Mary Jane Jones (née Wilson) from Irvinestown, County Fermanagh, the sixth of those twelve siblings. (Note: Mary Jane Wilson (Irvinestown 28 July 1840 – Harrogate 12 November 1918).) Her father was the Wesleyan minister, Reverend John William Jones of Donaghpatrick, County Meath, Ireland, who was born in Enniskillen, County Fermanagh, Ireland. (Note: Reverend John William Jones (born Enniskillen 1842).) He was minister of Sandy Row Methodist Church, Belfast.

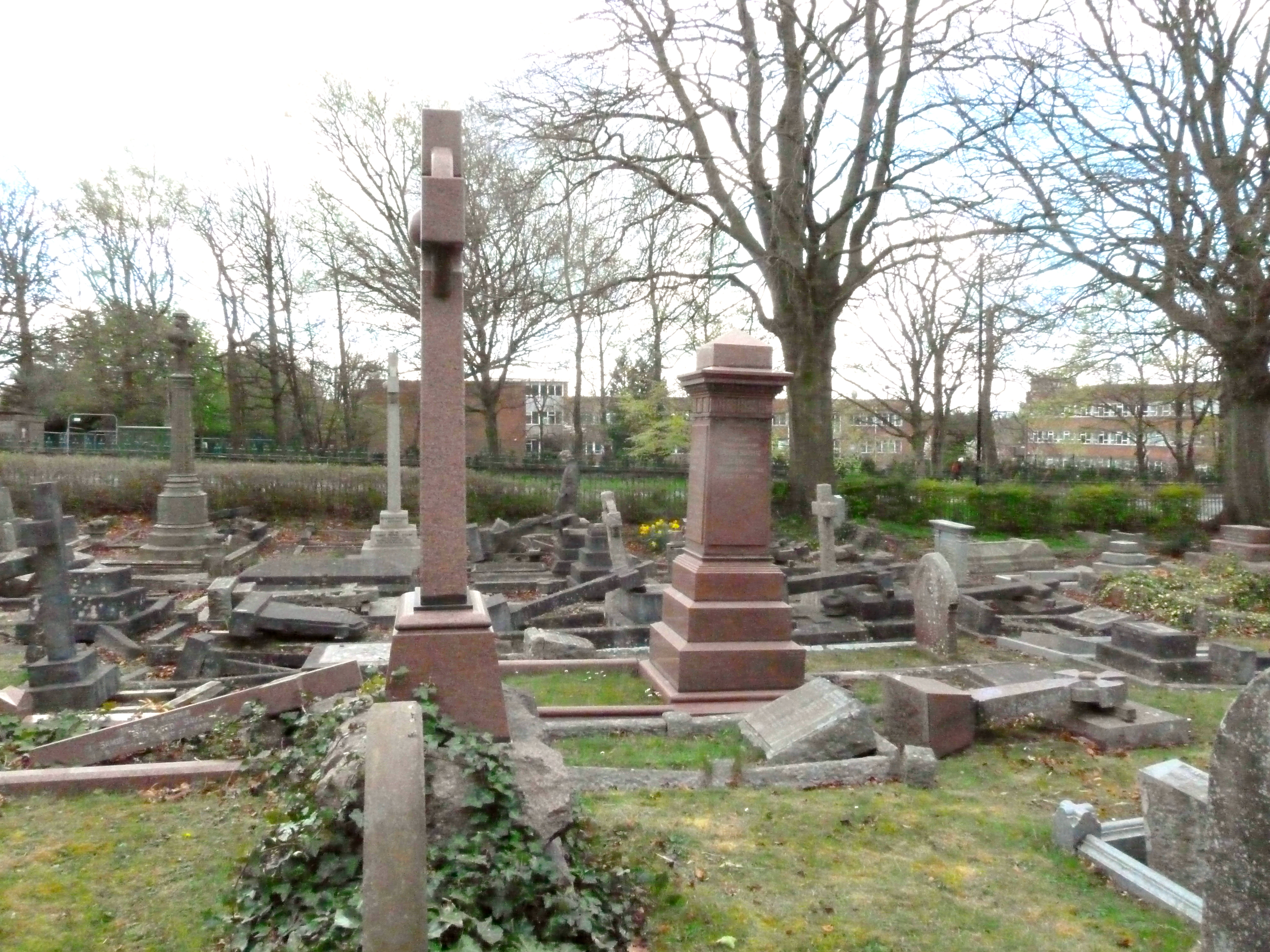
Jones' gravestone with open book, to right of G.M. Savery's tall monument

Jones was born at 20 Frederick Street, Belfast, County Antrim, Ireland, (Note: Elizabeth Wilhelmina Jones, known as M. E. Jones or Mina E. Jones (Belfast 27 October 1869 – Eastbourne 10 December 1959). GRO index: Deaths Dec 1959 Jones Elizabeth W. 90 Eastbourne 5h 280. Jones was the daughter of Reverend J. W. Jones of Donaghpatrick, County Meath, Ireland,) and was the eldest of eight siblings. (Note: Some of the siblings of Elizabeth Wilhelmina Jones were:Victoria Jane (or Graham) Taggart née Jones (1874 – 14 March 1953) who married architect W.D.R. Taggart in 1902, and Howard Augustus Jones (born 1882). One of her sisters became Lady Bell.) She was educated at the Methodist College Belfast. and was a graduate of the Royal Irish University (now the Queen's University Belfast). There she gained her Bachelor of Arts second class degree in Mathematics and Physics at Victoria College in 1891. In her youth, she was a hockey player. As an educator, she was known as Miss M. E. Jones, or Mina E. Jones. In England, Jones had several close friends. While teaching at Bradford, she shared accommodation and a holiday cottage with a "great friend and colleague", Gertrude Clement. Louie Davies, a former pupil at Percy Lodge, later became Jones' confidante and private secretary, and was "her devoted friend and admirer throughout her life".

Although accommodation was provided for Jones at Harrogate Ladies' College, she also maintained her own house and garden at Bewerley, North Yorkshire, and entertained staff and pupils there. She drove her own car, and in her free time toured around the country. During her holidays and following her retirement as a headmistress in 1937, she travelled abroad to the Holy Land, Europe, Egypt, South Africa and South America, learned to skate in Switzerland, then settled in 1956 in a flat facing the sea at Kepplestone, Meads, Eastbourne, Sussex. She died of cerebral thrombosis and arteriosclerosis on 10 December 1959 in Eastbourne, (Note: Quote from death certificate: Tenth December 1959 [at] 10 Kepplestone, Eastbourne. Elizabeth Wilhelmina Jones., 90 years. Headmistress (retired), spinster daughter of John William Jones, a Methodist minister. Cause of death: cerebral thrombosis, arteriosclerosis.) and was buried with her mother at Harlow Hill Cemetery, Harrogate.

== Bradford Girls' Grammar School ==
According to Hewlett, "almost immediately" after receiving her university degree in 1891, Jones left Ireland for England, seeking teaching work. Following a temporary illness, she sought experience in several minor schools. Her first recorded teaching appointment occurred three years after her arrival in England. Between January 1894 and 1898, Jones was a form mistress at Bradford Girls' Grammar School for nearly five years. The Methodist Times reported that she left "with the highest testimonials to her capacity and high influence".

== Harrogate Ladies' College ==
=== Collaboration with George Mearns Savery ===
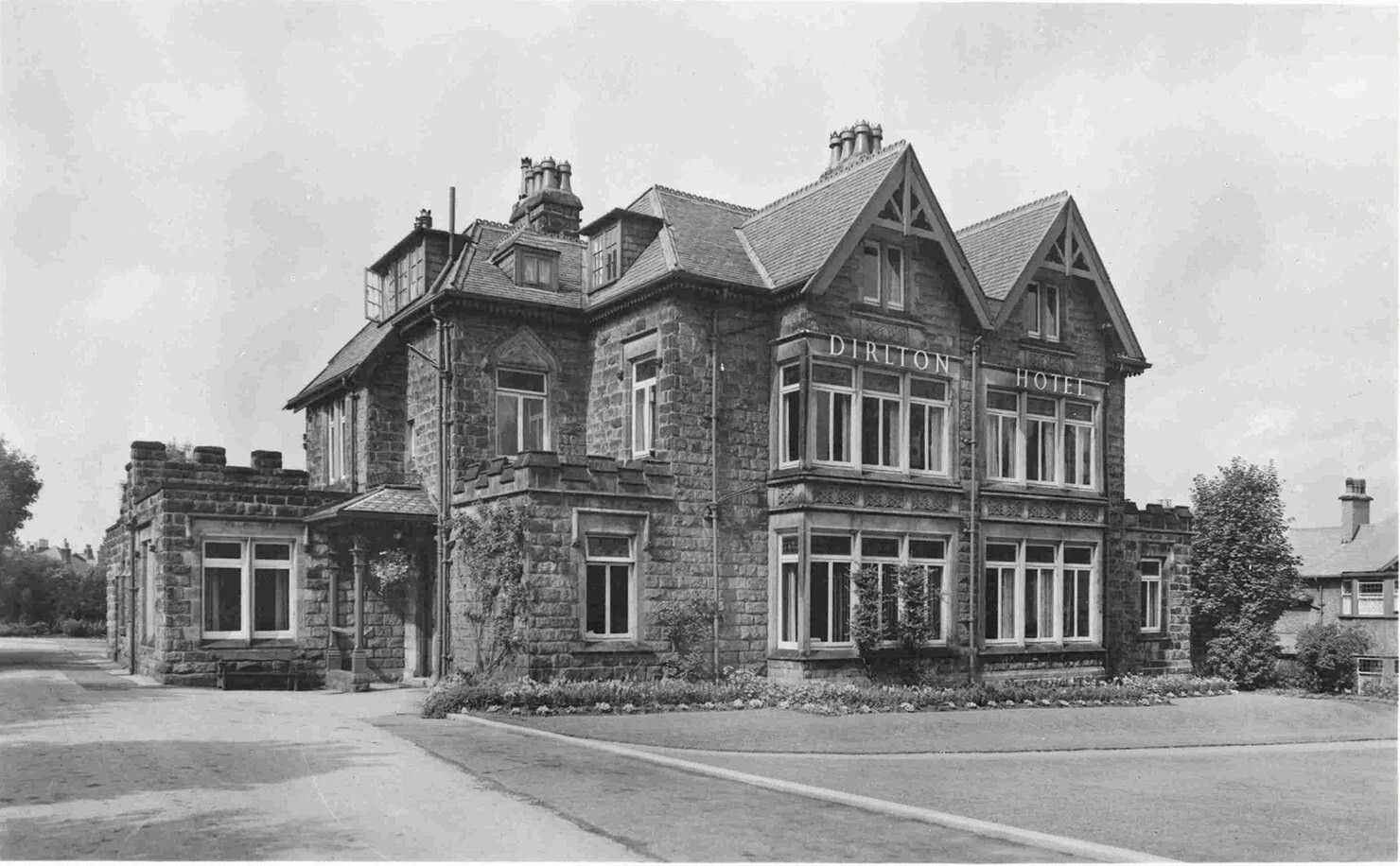
The former Dirlton Lodge

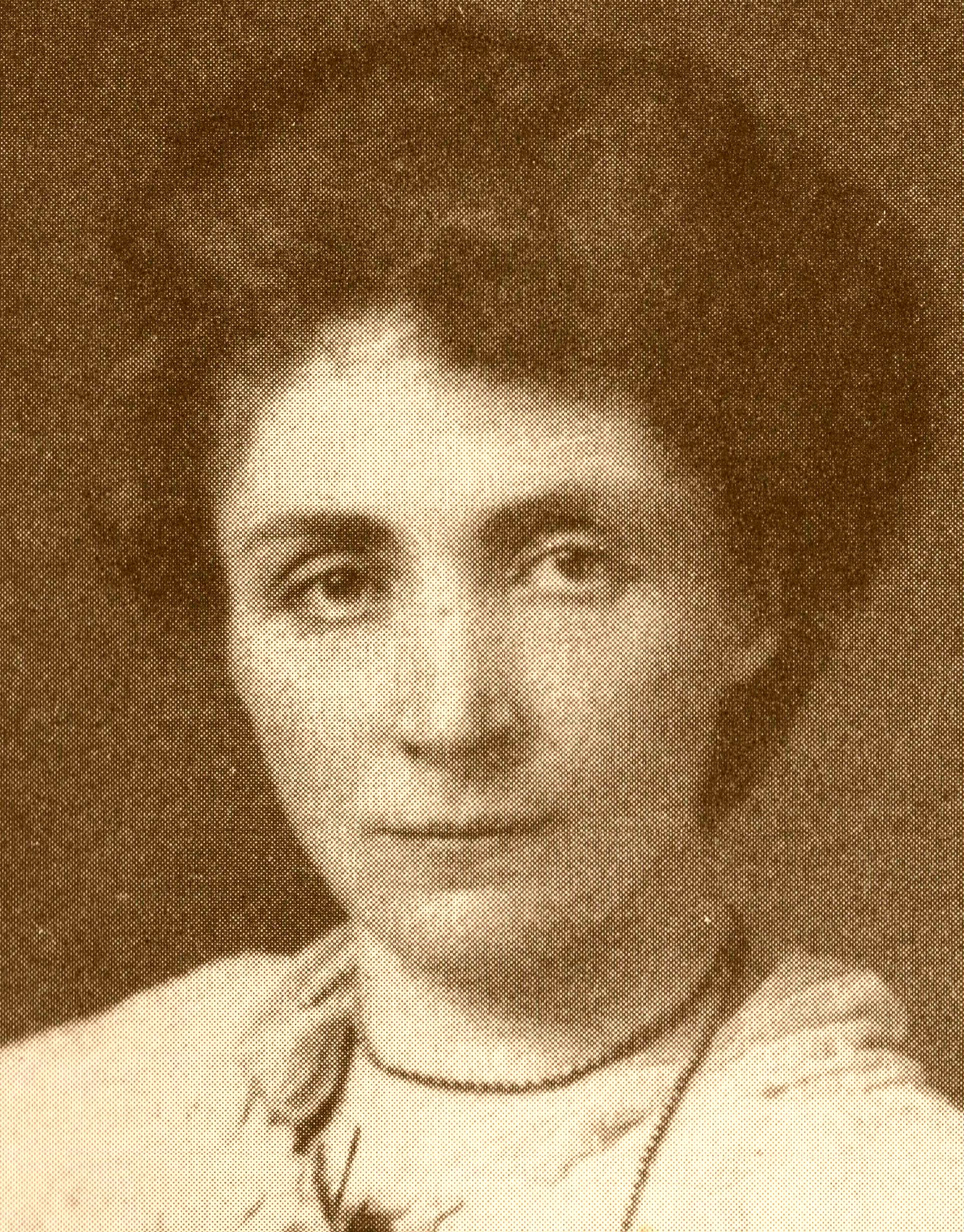
Jones, in her twenties

Towards the end of her employment at Bradford Girls' Grammar School, Jones applied for headships. She declined three offers, including one from South Africa, then applied for but did not win a position at Keighley Girls' Grammar School. However her application had impressed the Keighley school governor William Clough, who recommended her to his brother-in-law George Mearns Savery. After a few meetings with Savery she was offered a headship at Harrogate, but she hesitated due to the small size of Harrogate Ladies' College, and therefore the small scope for development. Jones often spoke of the moment when the dilemma was resolved. While walking at Grassington, her lifelong close friend Gertrude Clement challenged her to make her decision when they reached a certain gate. Finding a horseshoe shamrock brooch on the ground by the gate influenced her decision and she wrote her letter of acceptance that evening. (Note: It has long been believed in the UK and Ireland that horseshoes and shamrocks (clover leaves) bring good luck. See: List of lucky symbols.) At 28 years old, she was appointed headmistress at Harrogate Ladies' College, and served from September 1898 to April 1935. She used the shamrock or clover-leaf emblem to decorate pupils' summer uniforms until 1930, and she named the school's headmistress' accommodation "Grassington".

The school was initially known as The Ladies' College or Harrogate Ladies' College, then Harrogate College during Jones' lifetime. It was founded by George Mearns Savery in 1893 in Dirlton Lodge, a rented villa on Ripon Road, (Note: The villa at Dirlton was possibly the building which later became the Dirlton Hotel on Ripon Road, Harrogate) which had been built by David Simpson. It was started under the headship of Betsy Field Hall, who ran the school until 1898. By 1895, the school occupied Percy Lodge on the Oval, Harrogate, which the school retained after relocation. In 1901 the census finds Jones living with staff and pupils in various buildings, including Percy Lodge. In the same year Savery planned a new school building in collaboration with Miss M. E. Jones, in response to the expansion of the school, which was occurring under her leadership. Part of a sports field, which was already owned by Savery's Harrogate College for boys, was made available; it was on Clarence Drive, Harrogate.

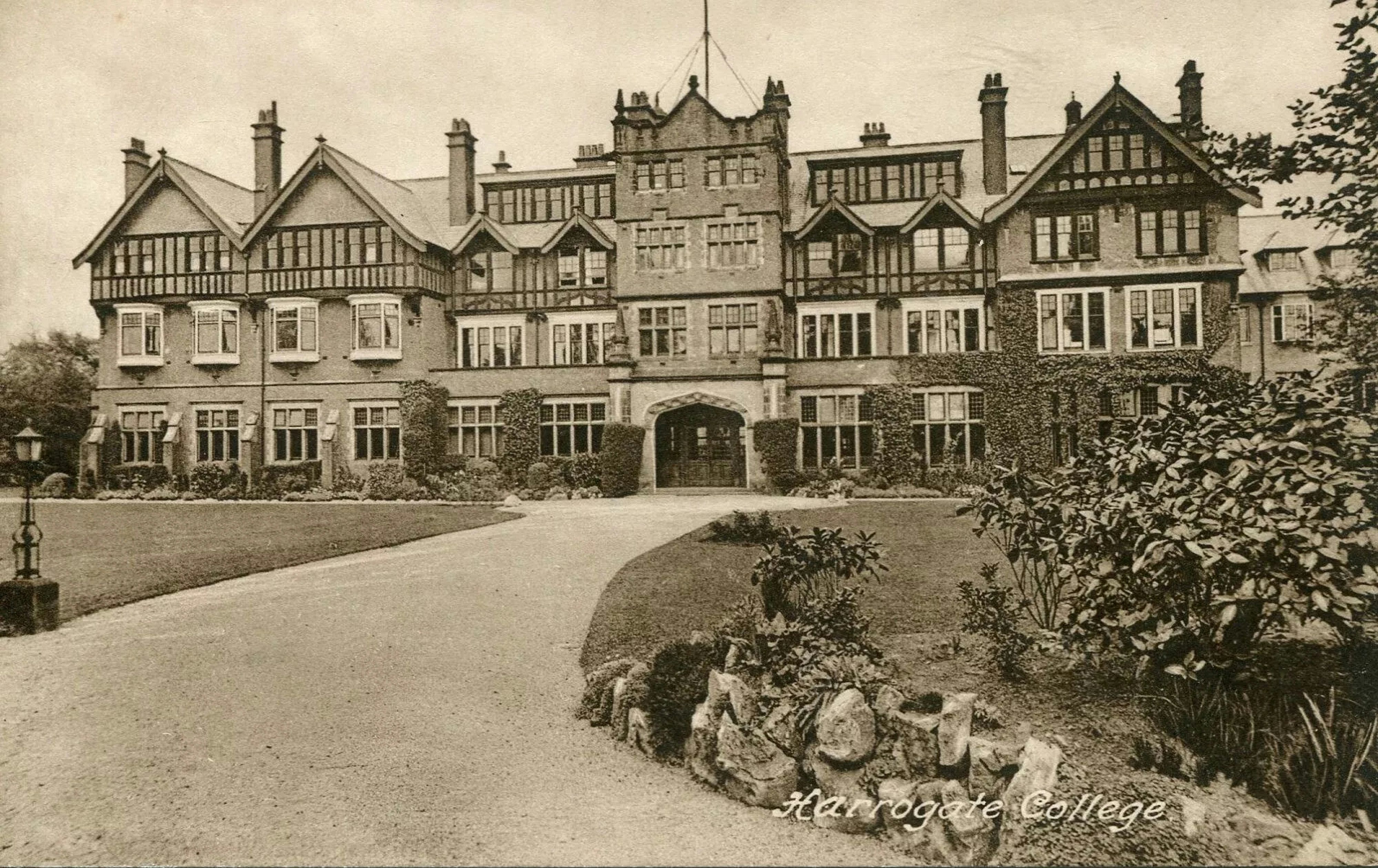
The 1904 school building

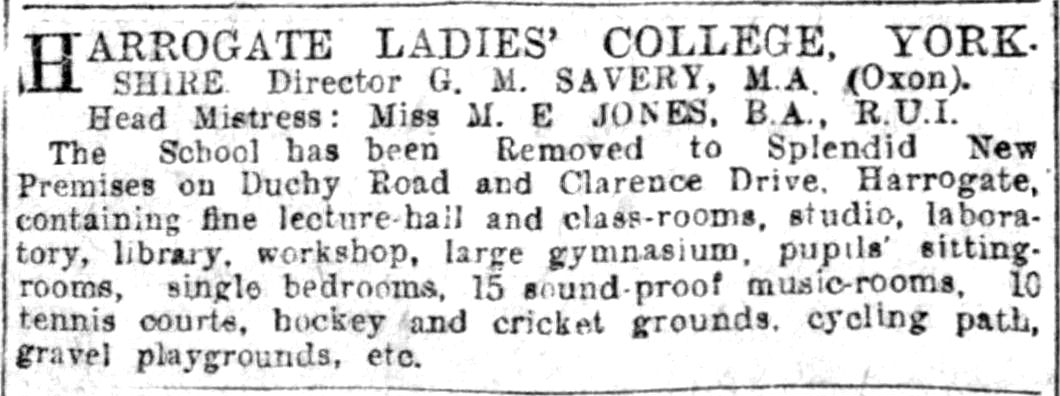
Advertisement, 1904

Ground was broken in 1902, and the building was opened for the school to move in, on 17 May 1904. In this building, according to the Yorkshire Post, Jones and Savery planned "everything for the best ... which would do in the lives of women what public schools for boys [had] done for men". A 1904 advertisement for the newly-housed school quoted a "fine lecture hall and classrooms, studio, laboratory, library, workshop, large gymnasium, pupils' sitting rooms, single bedrooms, 15 sound-proof music rooms, 10 tennis courts, hockey and cricket grounds, cycling path, gravel playgrounds etc." After the school opened, it still required the acquisition of nearby houses to accommodate boarding pupils and staff. The censuses of 1911 and 1921 find Jones accommodated in one of the school's boarding houses, with staff and pupils.

As described by the Yorkshire Post, the ideals of Jones and Savery for the school were "advancement in scholastic matters, the promotion of physical well-being, [and] the infusion of a fine moral and spiritual tone". They rejected historical tendencies towards "domination of ideas for the education of boys", the bluestocking, the hausfrau and the finishing school, in favour of potential female careers, "mental and moral training [and] personal responsibility", public duty, and home-making including "pride in the beauty and order of the home". Those ideals of 1901 would, of course, be superseded in certain respects in later years, but a tradition of "piety, learning and service" was maintained. Although closely supervised by Savery, under Jones' watch various changes occurred. Before Savery died, the school was admired for its solo singing, and its cricket team which played on equal terms against Savery's Harrogate College for boys. The boys' school closed in 1903, and during Jones' headship the girls' school carried the name, Harrogate College.

=== Independent headship from 1904 ===
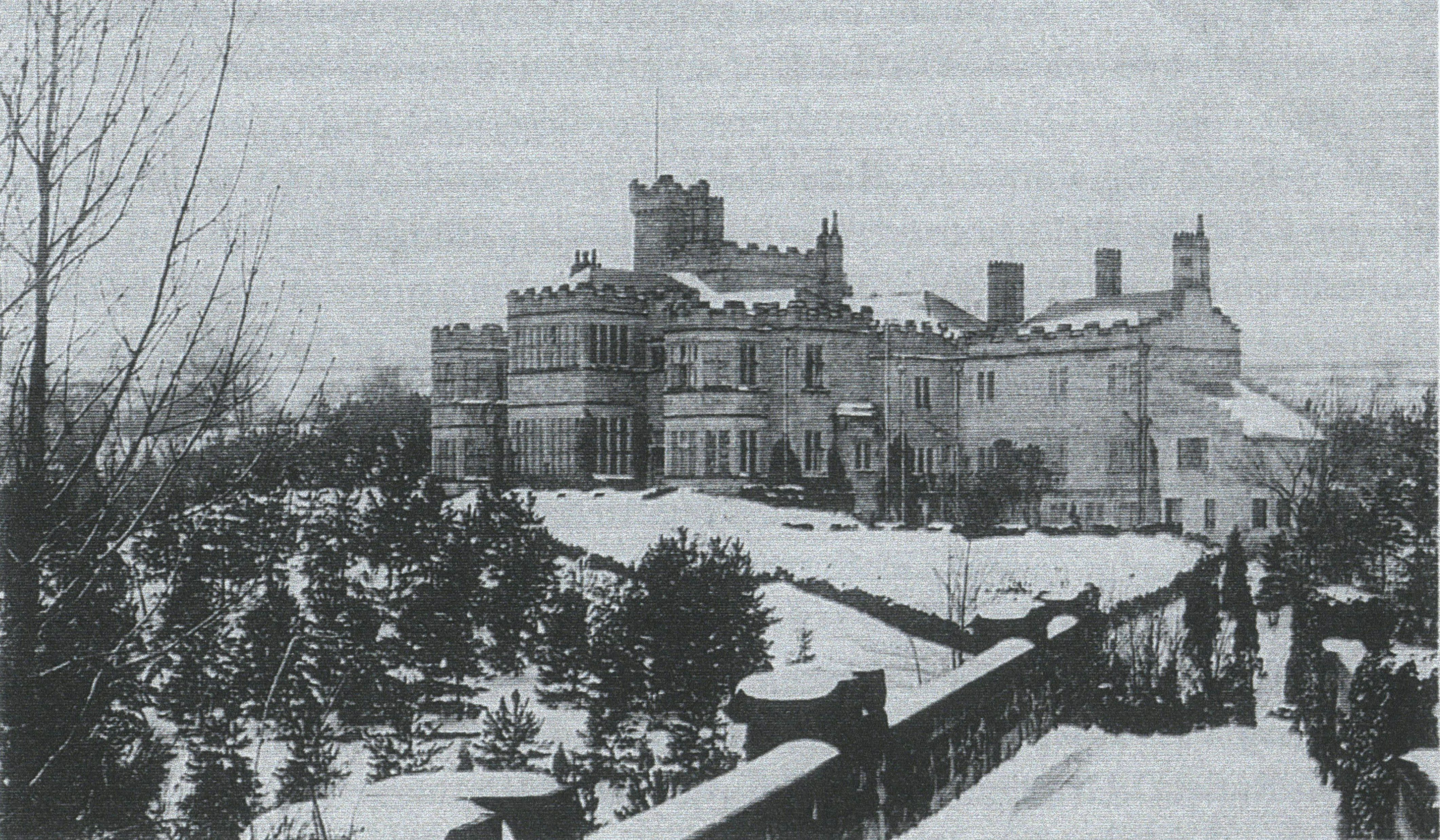
Oakdale Manor

From 1904 various long-term associates and teachers joined the school, including Jones' sister Lena Jones who taught drama and games, (Note: Lady Selina Maria "Lena" Bell née Jones (2 November 1879 – 18 July 1965). GRO index: Marriages Mar 1943 Jones Selina M. and Bell Ernest Albert Seymour, Chipping N. 3a 2981. Deaths Sep 1965 Bell Selina M. 86 Eastbourne 5h 248. Lena Jones married Sir Ernest Bell (1867–1955), chairman of the Indian Government Railway Board 1923–1926. See "Belfast woman", Belfast Telegraph, 14 October 1965, page 8 col.6.) and Dora Forde, an Irish friend who became one of the housemistresses. At some point Jones' brother, Bertie Jones, (Note: Charles Albert "Bertie" Jones (c.1882 – Eastbourne 30 September 1962). Deaths Dec 1962 Jones Charles A. 80 Eastbourne 5h 240. The ashes of Bertie Jones are buried in the grave of his mother, and sister E.W. Jones, at Harlow Hill Cemetery.) became bursar of the school. After Savery's death, according to the Illustrated London News, the school "took its place as one of the leading girls' boarding schools in the North". However, in funding the new school building Savery "had risked all of his resources, and there were periods of financial anxiety and stringency" for those running Harrogate Ladies' College. Nevertheless, his will gave Jones the right to purchase up to half of the shares in the school from Savery's wife, and Jones inherited another quarter of the shares after Mrs Savery died. The will also permitted her to purchase the rest of the shares.

Dame Margery Ellinor, Lady Lawson-Tancred, widow of Sir Thomas Selby Lawson-Tancred, said, "[Jones] was one of the pioneers of her day in woman's education of a modern type, which had not existed for more than three or four decades before she courageously undertook the responsibility of the development of a school on modern lines". She was training pupils in the domestic arts in anticipation of the "era of the servantless house [which was] close at hand". The school's 1914 Prospectus says, "Discipline is maintained by instilling a desire rather than through fear of punishment. As far as possible the girls are encouraged to govern themselves by principles of honour. In the interests of exercise, Jones was apt to organise ad hoc outings involving long walks, for example to Brimham Rocks and Rievaulx Abbey. From 1900 the pupils played tennis, cricket and hockey, soon followed by swimming, athletics and cycling. Horseriding was started in 1912, and became a strong feature of the curriculum from 1922, with sometimes more than 30 pupils attending hacks. During her tenure the pupils had a historical society, a camera club, an art club and a debating society. She also oversaw theatrical performances, organised by her sister Lena, in aid of charity. The school mottoes chosen by Jones were Industria, Fide, Pietate (industry, faith, piety) and Per Ardua ad Alta (through difficulties to greatness). During the Christmas season, Jones organised parties with a Christmas tree, forty uniformed maids bringing food including Christmas pudding, peacock pie and boar's head, and a costumed Father Christmas on a sledge.

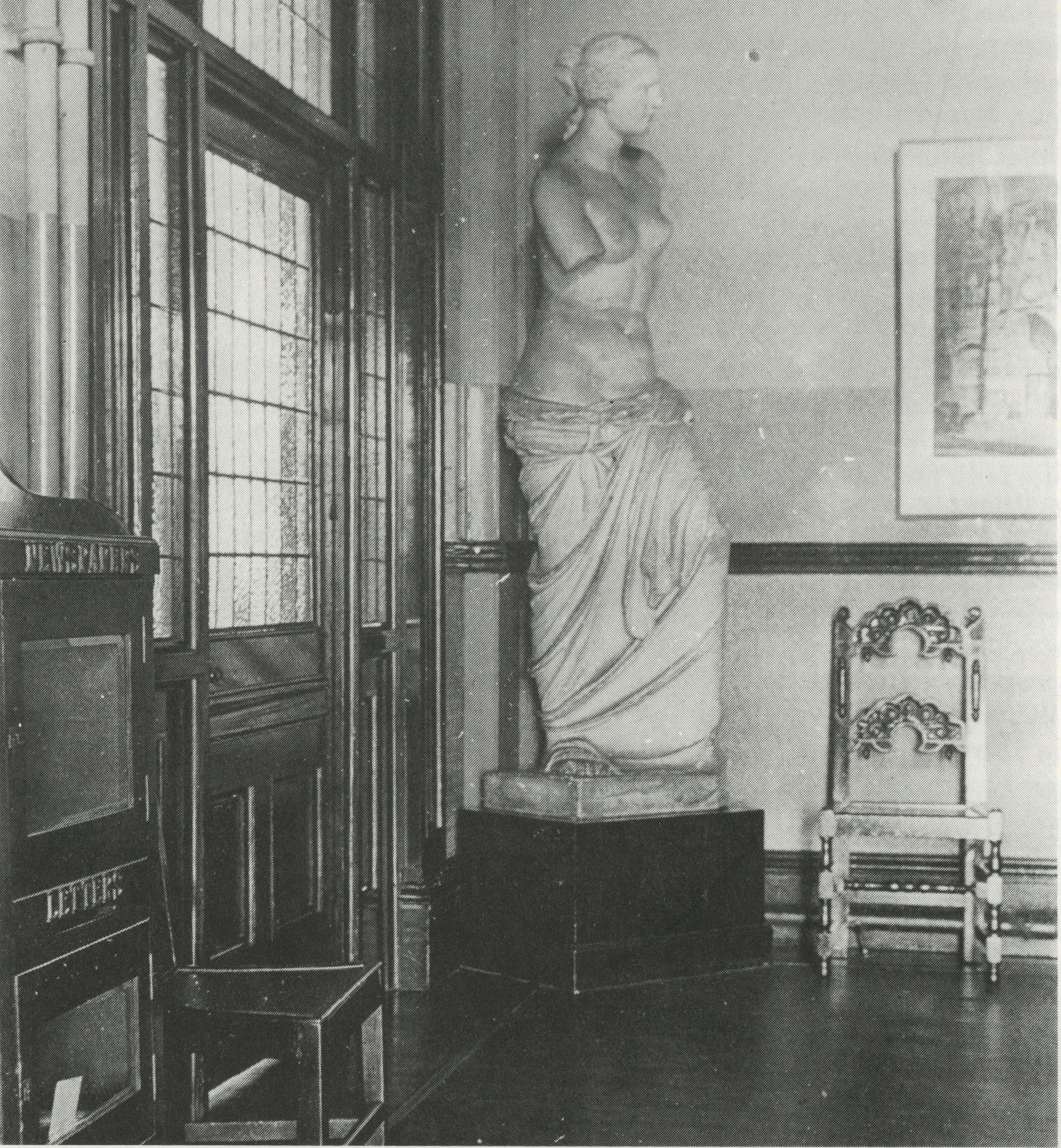
Venus de Milo in corridor, before 1939

There was much rearrangement of the building's interior in the early days, and Jones brought many large reproduction artworks from Italy, including a life-sized reproduction of the Venus de Milo, to decorate the school and inspire the pupils. Most of these were removed, lost or destroyed during the Second World War, while the building was occupied by the Ministry of Aircraft Production. In 1907 or 1910, in the original library over the entrance hall, the Old Girls installed the 1907 overmantel by Frances Darlington entitled, Sir Percival's Vision of the Holy Grail. (Note: Sr Perceval's Vision of the Holy Grail (1907) by Frances Darlington. As of 2025 this piece was in St Mary the Virgin Church, Ingleton, North Yorkshire.) 26 June 1914, twenty-one years after Savery's foundation, was the school's Coming of Age Day, on which a thousand people attended the celebration, and pupils took part in entertainments. On that day, Jones was presented with a full-length portrait by Ernest Moore, a diamond pendant and an illuminated address. The portrait was subsequently hung in the school dining hall.

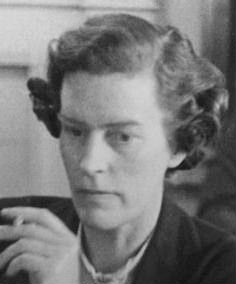
Former pupil Nancy Broadfield Parkinson

During the First World War the upper school was not evacuated, but in 1916 the school's junior department was removed to Oakdale Manor, the mansion built by mayor David Simpson, and became the preparatory school for Harrogate Ladies' College. Jones arranged that the pupils would contribute to war work by knitting accessories for soldiers, gardening and secretarial courses were added to the curriculum, and staff and pupils made swabs and splints for the war effort. Previously a number of nearby properties had been purchased as extensions to the school's premises, and during the war Jones purchased more of these. In the Lincoln block, fifty senior girls could live separately, speaking only French for one school term. At the same time, Jones oversaw the accommodation of a Belgian refugee family in one of the school boarding houses. In 1919 she arranged for the formation of the 5th Harrogate Company of Guides for the pupils, led by staff members. A prominent pupil during Jones' tenure was Nancy Broadfield Parkinson, (Note: Nancy Broadfield Parkinson (Prestwich 23 January 1904 – St Marylebone 10 December 1974). GRO index: Births Mar 1904 Parkinson Nancy Broadfield Prestwich 8d 470. Deaths Dec 1974 Parkinson Nancy Broadfield. Birth 23 JA 1904 St Marylebonee 14 2166.) controller of the British Council (Home Division) during the Second World War. She was a graduate of the University of London, and according to Hewlett, "the first woman other than the Queen to achieve [the] distinction of Dame Commander of the Order of Michael and St George".

=== Salaried headmistress ===
By the end of the First World War, Jones owned only half of the school business and property, so that the school's future was not fully secure. In 1924 Jones came under the influence of Reverend Percy Warrington, who, apparently under the auspices of the "Church of England Trust", purchased an interest in the school and instituted a school board. Jones was appointed as a salaried headmistress under Lord Gisborough as chairman and Sir Charles King-Harman as vice-chairman of the board. At that point the school had 322 pupils, 48 resident teachers and 49 people in service. The Union of Old Girls included 514 life members. More improvements in school accommodation followed this move, including a new gymnasium and extra bedrooms and bathrooms. By 1928 Jones was planning the swimming pool, designed by her brother in law W.D.R. Taggart, the Belfast architect who had designed the new wing for the gymnasium. The pool opened in May 1930 at a total cost of £6,000 (equivalent to £339,080.9 in 2025). However, Warrington mishandled the school's funds, and the institution had to be rescued. In June 1934, in the last full year of Jones' headship, the school joined the Allied Schools Company and became a public school with governors.

On her retirement Jones became a school governor and founded a school entrance scholarship for daughters of Old Girls. Between her retirement in April 1935 and the year before her death, Jones kept an active interest in the school. In 1939, when the school was evacuated to Swinton Hall for the duration of the Second World War, she returned to assist with the move. In London in December 1958 she attended a 90th-birthday luncheon that was given in her honour in the company of 300 former pupils. On that occasion she was presented with a "personal letter of tribute and appreciation" by the minister of education, David Eccles. In a summary of Jones' career, Hewlett said, "She was always greatly influenced by Mr Savery's undoubted personality. But Miss Jones was no mere follower; she was a pioneer in her own right".

== Harrogate Ladies' School Chapel ==
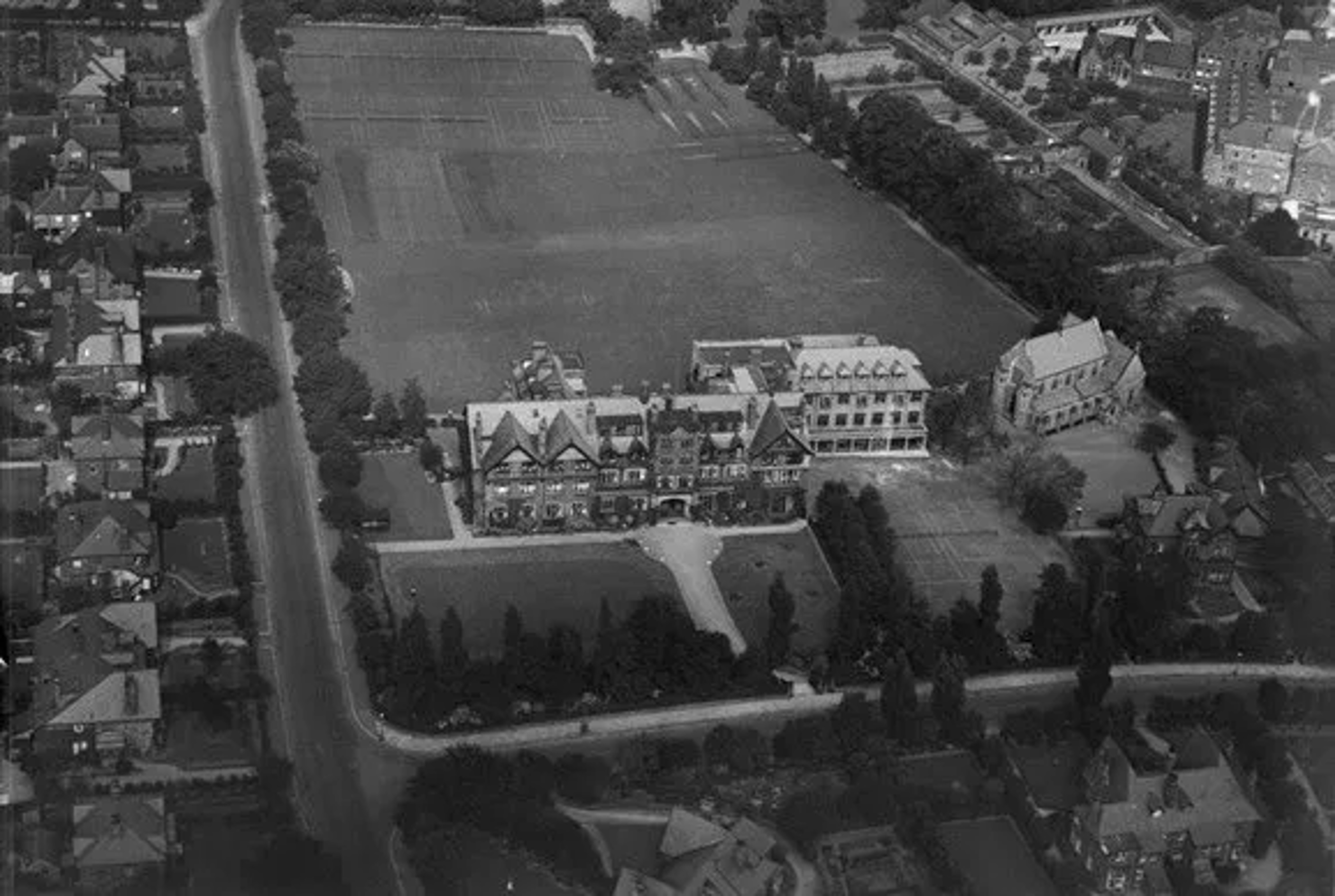
Aerial view of the school and chapel, 1926

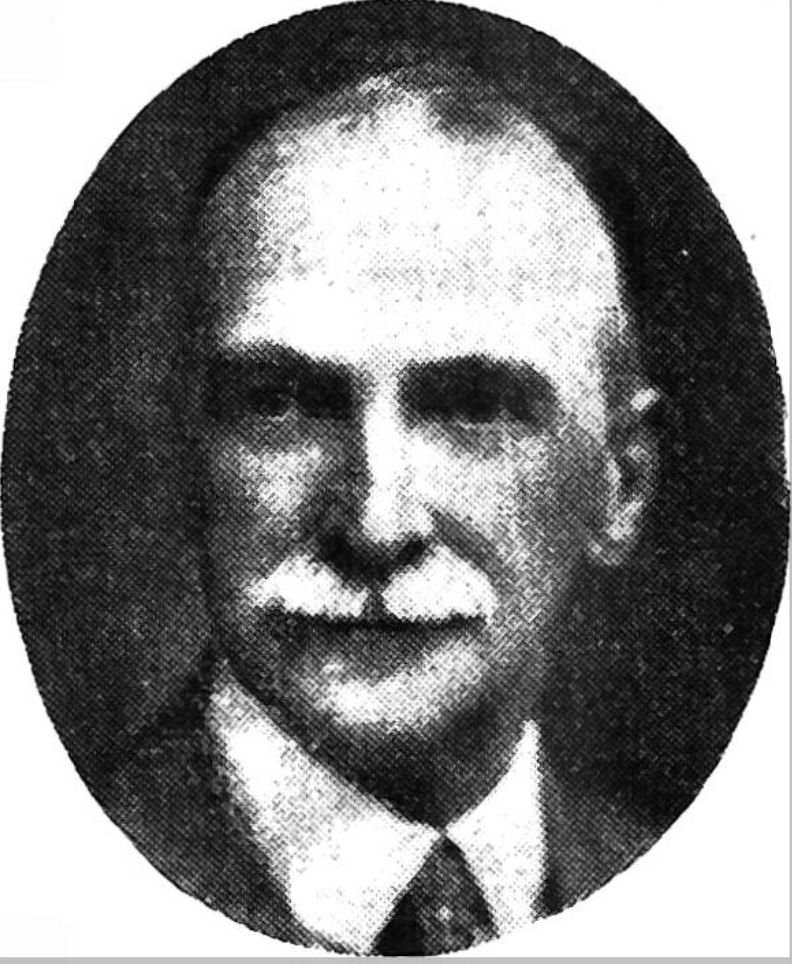
Architect W.D.R. Taggart, FRIBA

The First World War interrupted Jones' plans and diverted the funding for a new school chapel, to be built as a memorial to the founder of the school, George Mearns Savery. However, for the sum of £420 (equivalent to £16,230.32 in 2025), Jones was able to purchase the fabric of the demolished Old St Mary's Church, Harrogate, in 1920. This church had been built in 1822, and had stood until 1920, by which time it was closed due to instability, and the fabric was for sale. By 1922 funds had been raised to move the church fabric to the intended site, close to the school, and building plans were approved in July 1922.

The architect for this rebuild was W.D.R. Taggart, FRIBA. (Note: William David Redmond Taggart, FRIBA (Belfast 1872 – Belfast 1 October 1940). Flourished 1898–1940. Designed Belfast St Bartholomew and St Finnian churches. Architect to Antrim Regional Education Committee, Engineer to Antrim Rural District Council, Engineer to Belfast Rural District Council. In partnership with W.H. Silk, then with his son Redmond Thibeaudeau Taggart, RNVR. See Directory of British Architects, 1834-1914, Vol. 2 (L-Z), page 750. Taggart married Victoria Jane,Jones, sister of Elizabeth Wilhelmina Jones.) The ground was broken in October 1922. The foundation stone was laid on 24 February 1923, in the presence of Edward Wood, the President of the Board of Education. The building was dedicated by the Bishop of Ripon on 29 September of the same year. Although the church's tower could not be rebuilt, and the building needed new piers and roof slates, the existing structure with nave and chancel "was a splendid addition to the college", according to historian Malcolm Neesam. Those pews which were surplus to requirement were used as outdoor seating, and seating by the swimming pool.

Various church furnishings were donated by Harrogate College Union, the Society of Old Girls, and others. The chapel bell came from the steam ship Emeliano Bilboa, a Spanish merchant ship, wrecked on the English coast. From 1923 it rang for morning prayers. As a birthday present to Jones, the school presented her with the church altar. Its original panels were embroidered by school staff with images of Saint Cecilia, Saint Agnes, Saint Catherine and Saint Barbara, with Saint Ursula placed centrally, although the panels were all later framed and hung elsewhere in the building. The founder's wife Mrs Savery donated the organ, and later in 1938 the Robert Thompson lectern was donated. The total cost of the building was £15,506 (equivalent to £810,692.87 in 2025). The school's music director and organist, Louie Davies, was the college chapel's first choirmaster.

== Maison Blanche ==
In 1907 in Paris Jones opened Maison Blanche, a branch of the school where conversational French could be learned and practised by older pupils from the mother school in Harrogate. Maison Blanche was obliged to close in 1914 when the First World War began.

== Accolades and memorials ==
Historian Malcolm Neesam commented that Jones "proved to be an outstanding headmistress". Yorkshire Life said that the "pioneering headmistress, Elizabeth Wilhelmina Jones, was a worthy proponent of the revolution in girls' education ... she continued forging [the United Kingdom's] reputation as a leader amongst girls' schools for 37 years". The Northern Whig declared her "one of the leading educationists in England". The Belfast Telegraph commented that on her watch "Harrogate [College] became one of the most successful girls' schools in England". Sir Thomas Gardiner described her as an "almost fabulous Headmistress by whose endeavours the school had in the space of a few years attained a position of eminence ... [When she was 82] the joy of life, which survived a Victorian upbringing in an Ulster home and a working life burdened with heavy responsibility, [was] still with her".

In 1962 a memorial assembly hall and a gymnasium were opened and dedicated to Jones' memory by the Countess of Swinton, Molly Boynton. According to the Eastbourne Herald, after Jones' death "tribute [was] paid to her work and personality in the double dedication [on 5 May 1963] of two memorials in the college chapel". Those memorials consisted of oak screens for the organ, and stained glass in the east window.
