= St Mary's Church, Harrogate =

Church in Harrogate, North Yorkshire, England

Coordinates: 53.9879°N 1.5500°W

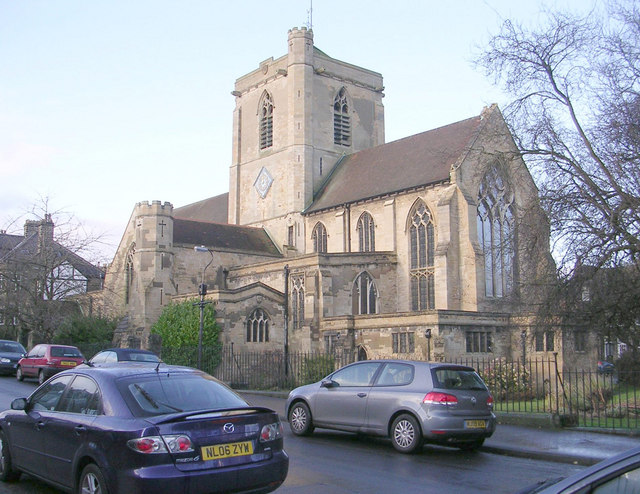
- St Mary's Church, Westcliffe Grove, Harrogate

- Location within North Yorkshire
- OS grid reference: SE 294 547
- Country: England
- Denomination: Church of England
- Churchmanship: Evangelical

Architecture
- Heritage designation: Grade II* listed
- Architect: Walter Tapper
- Completed: 1916

Administration
- Diocese: Leeds
- Parish: Harrogate

St Mary's Church, Harrogate is a Grade II* listed redundant parish church in Harrogate, North Yorkshire, England. The successor of the church, which uses the former church hall, is now known as Kairos Church.

== History ==
=== Old St Mary's Church, Harrogate ===
In 1822 the inhabitants of Low Harrogate had "hitherto felt great inconvenience from the want of a place of worship ... The inhabitants of Pannal ... agreed to raise £500 (equivalent to £54,926 in 2025) on the parish rates to assist in promoting this desirable object". The foundation stone of the first Anglican St Mary's church in Low Harrogate was laid on 4 September 1822, "by Rev. R.R. Hunter, vicar of Pannal, in the presence of a numerous assemblage of the visitors ... and neighbouring residents". It was a plain building, funded by a grant from the Commissioners of the Million Act. It was erected in 1824, and consecrated in 1825. It had 800 seats and was assigned as a parish in 1830. It was declared unsafe in 1903. The fabric of Old St Mary's was purchased in 1922 by Elizabeth Wilhelmina Jones, the headmistress of Harrogate Ladies' College. In 1923 it was rebuilt in the school grounds, without the tower, to the design of W. D. R. Taggart.

=== St Mary's replacement church, Harrogate ===
The replacement church was built at the current site in 1916 to designs by the architect Walter Tapper. It was constructed in the 14th century English gothic style.

In 2007 the church closed as a parish church because of maintenance problems. It was revived by Mark Carey as a fresh expression of church, still within the Church of England, but now serving the whole of Harrogate. It was renamed as Kairos Church and now meets in Westcliffe Hall, opposite the old St Mary's building and has a vibrant congregation.

The St Mary's Building is now owned by Shaw and Jagger Architects.

== Lofthouse Memorial ==
The stone vaulted south chapel contains a tomb and memorial to Richard Chapman Lofthouse (1832–1907) Deputy Surgeon General of the British Army who founded the church. He served in the Crimean War and the Indian Mutiny.

== Bells ==
The tower once contained a ring of 8 bells in the key of F, dating from 1916 and by Taylors of Loughborough. The tenor bell was 16 cwt.

The four heaviest bells were removed after the church was declared redundant, and are now hung in the Grote Kerk of Dordrecht. With six new European-cast bells, they form the first peal of change ringing church bells in the Netherlands, and the heaviest ring of change ringing bells in the European mainland.

== Organ ==
The first organ was installed in 1895 by James Jepson Binns. This was replaced in 1919 with an instrument by Harrison and Harrison. Details of the organ can be found on the National Pipe Organ Register.

=== Organists ===
- J. E. W. Lord 1894 – ???? (formerly organist of Bridlington Priory)
- J. C. Stephenson, ARCO c. 1912
- A. Beaumont, FRCO 1915 – 1946
- Harold Mills c. 1954?

== See also ==
- Grade II* listed churches in North Yorkshire (district)
- Listed buildings in Harrogate (Harlow Moor Ward)
