= Ernest Moore =

Ernest Moore may refer to:

- Ernest Moore (painter) (1865–1940), British painter
- Ernest Carroll Moore (1871–1955), American philosophy and education professor, founder of University of California, Los Angeles
- Ernest E. Moore (1881–1962), American attorney and politician in Vermont
- Ernest Robert Moore (1869–1957), American politician and banker
