= Nancy Broadfield Parkinson =

British civil servant (1904–1974)

Dame Nancy Broadfield Parkinson DCMG, CBE
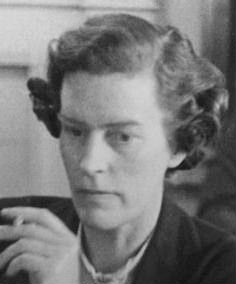
- Born: 23 January 1904; Prestwich, England
- Died: 10 December 1974 (aged 70); Marylebone, London
- Education: Harrogate Ladies' College; Bedford College, London
- Occupation: Controller of the British Council (Home Division) during the Second World War

Dame Nancy Broadfield Parkinson DCMG, CBE, (23 January 1904 – 10 December 1974) was a British civil servant, and controller of the British Council (Home Division) during the Second World War.

During the war, Parkinson assisted refugees and organised 365 centres to arrange accommodation and education for them. Following the war, she supported international students and foreign visitors to the United Kingdom. She worked in the cause of international relations, and towards the establishment of UNESCO. She was also instrumental in promoting international cooperation in education via the conferences of the allied ministers of education. In recognition of this work, she was said to have been "the first woman other than the Queen to achieve [the] distinction of Dame Commander of the Order of Michael and St George".

== Background ==
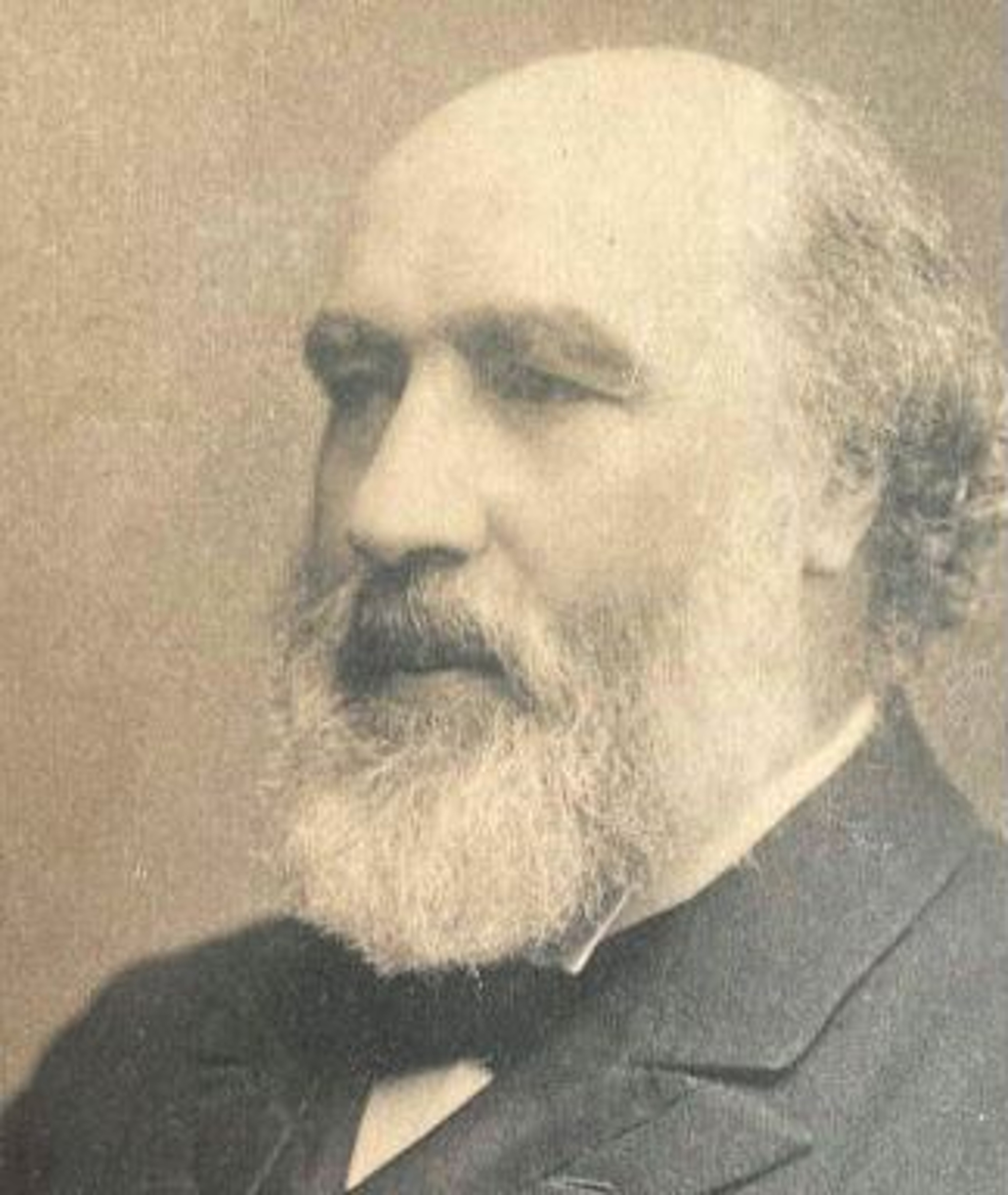
Robert Barclay, cloth merchant

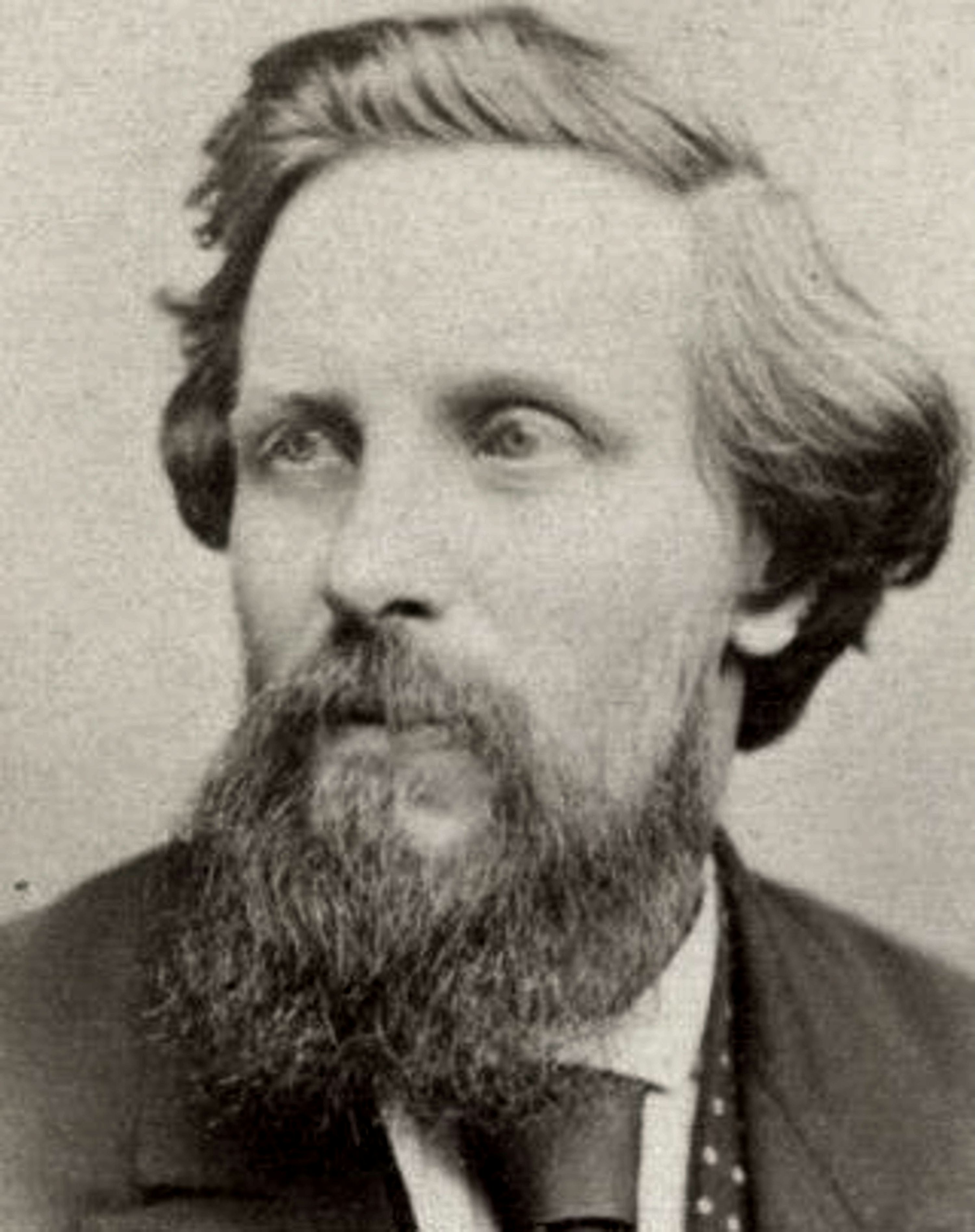
Thomas Parkinson, merchant-draper

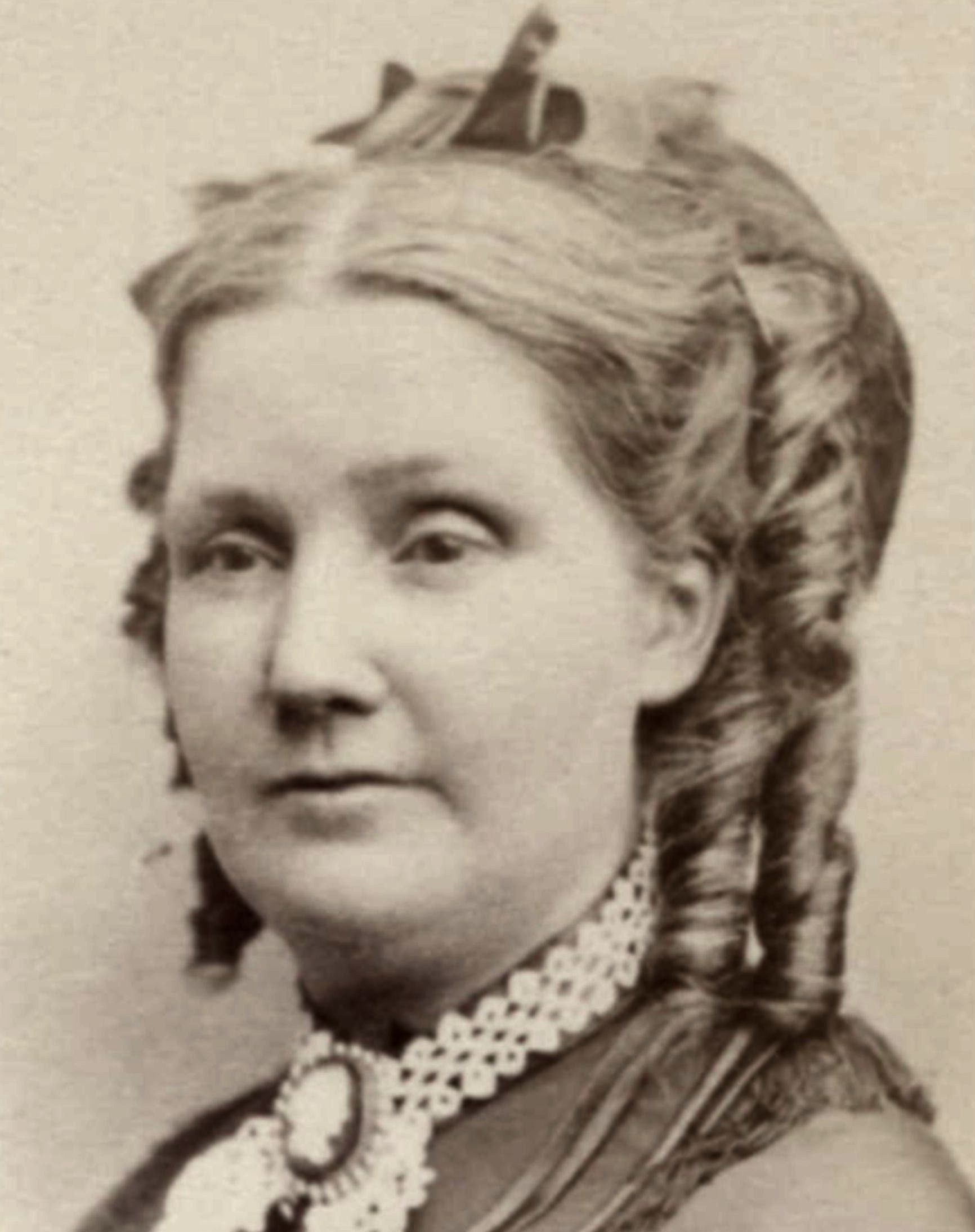
Frances Parkinson née Broadfield

Parkinson was born into a Northern England manufacturing and mercantile family which was mainly of non-conformist faith during her childhood. One of Parkinson's maternal great-grandfathers was Thomas Noton, who was a bookkeeper, and later the manager of a cotton mill in Oldham, Greater Manchester. (Note: Thomas Noton (Oldham 30 March 1806 – Manchester 17 March 1873). GRO index: Deaths Mar 1873 Noton Thomas 66 Oldham 8d 486.) He married Ann Buckley, (Note: Ann Buckley (13 August 1809 – Oldham 1867).GRO index: Deaths Jun 1867 Noton Ann 64 Oldham 8d 388.) daughter of John and Betty Buckley. (Note: Marriage of John and Betty Buckley, in England select marriages 1538-1973. Quote: Ann Buckley and Thomas Noton 16 October 1831, at Prestwich, Lancashire. See also: Marriages solemnised in the parish of Prestwich in the county of Lancaster in the year 1831. In: Marriages solemnised in the parish of Prestwich in the county of Lancaster in the year 1831, page 184. Quote: Thomas Noton and Ann Buckley of this parish of Oldham were married in this church by banns in Prestwich Parish Church this 16th day of October in the year 1831. (both signed the register).) They baptised their first child William in a Wesleyan chapel in Oldham. (Note: Non-conformist and non-parochial registers 1567-1936, p.174. Oldham, Manchester Street Chapel (Wesleyan). Baptism of William, son of Thomas Noton and Ann Buckley.) Parkinson's maternal grandfather was Robert Barclay, a cloth merchant trading with Argentina. (Note: Robert Barclay (Scotland 1 December 1830 – Manchester 6 May 1906). GRO index: Deaths Jun 1906 Barclay Robert 76 Prestwich 8d 303.) (Note: 1881 England Census. Spring Field, Bury New Road, Broughton, Salford. RG11/3955. page 39/69. Schedule 148 Quote: Barclay describes himself as a South American merchant. He is living with his wife, six children and four servants) who married Mary Anne Noton. (Note: Mary Anne Barclay née Noton (Oldham 21 February 1837 – Prestwich 1 December 1902). GRO index: Marriages Sep 1862 Noton Mary Anne and Barclay Robert, Oldham 8d 855. Deaths Dec 1902 Barclay Mary Ann 65 Prestwich 8d 308.) Mary Anne Noton was baptised in the Anglican parish church in Oldham on 5 November 1837. (Note: Church of England births and baptisms 1813-1915, p.209. Quote: 5th November 1837 in Oldham, Manchester, Mary Ann born February 21st 1837, daughter of Thomas Noton (manager of a cotton mill) and Ann Noton of York Street, Oldham.)

One of Parkinson's paternal great grandfathers was labourer John Parkinson of Back Kirkham Street, Preston, Lancashire. (Note: John Parkinson (Lytham St Annes 2 May 1784 – Lytham 28 February 1872). Deaths Mar 1872 Parkinson John 87 Fylde 8e 466.) His wife was Ellen Parkinson née Garstang. (Note: Ellen Parkinson née Garstang (Preston November 1800 – 28 December 1879). GRO index: Deaths Dec 1879 Parkinson Ellen 79 Preston 8e 392.) They baptised their son Thomas in an Anglican church. (Note: Lancashire, England, Church of England Births and Baptisms, 1813-1911, page 145/276. Quote: 29 May 1825. Baptism of Thomas, son of John (labourer) and Ellen Parkinson of Back Kirkham Street, Preston, Lancashire.) Parkinson's paternal grandfather was Thomas Parkinson, (Note: Thomas Parkinson (Preston 16 September 1824 – Prestwich 7 January 1908). GRO index: Deaths Mar 1908 Parkinson Thomas 83 Prestwich 8d 342. He died at Greenmount, Bury New Road, Prestwich.) a merchant and draper employing 650 hands in Moss Side, Lancashire. He married Frances Broadfield, (Note: Frances "Fanny" Parkinson née Broadfield (Manchester 24 April 1825 – Prestwich 25 October 1901). GRO index: Marriages Jun 1847 Broadfield Frances Manchester XX 641. Deaths Dec 1901 Parkinson Frances 76 Prestwich 8d 332. She died at Greenmount, as did her husband. Thomas Parkinson.) (Note: 1871 England Census for Thomas Parkinson. Roseleigh, Bury New Road, Prestwich. RG10/4067. Page 90/53. Schedule 279 Quote: William Parkinson age 46, merchant draper manufacturer, born Preston. Wife Frances age 45, born Manchester. Four children including Frank age 10, born Manchester.) daughter of the Manchester grocer John Broadfield. (Note: John Broadfield (Bridgnorth 12 September 1802 – Manchester 7 October 1876). GRO index: Deaths Dec 1876 Broadfield John 73 Prestwich 8d 307.) (Note: 1841 England Census for John Broadfield. Market Street, Manchester. HO107/573/1. Page 38. Schedule 43) (Note: 1861 England Census for Frank Parkinson. 2 Queens Terrace, Moss Side, Lancashire. RG9/2901. Page 47/76. Schedule 190.) Parkinson's father was towel manufacturer Frank Parkinson of Prestwich, Greater Manchester, (Note: Frank Parkinson (Manchester 18 September 1860 – Grasmere 8 May 1919). GRO index: Births Dec 1860 Parkinson Frank Salford 8d 25. Deaths Jun 1919 Parkinson Frank 58 Kendal 10b 791. The death certificate says: "Eighth May 1919, Red Bank, Grasmere. Frank Parkinson, aged 58 years, of independent means, of 2 Rutland Drive, Kersal, Salford. Cause of death, heart failure. Informant: S. Clifton Parkinson, nephew, of 10 York St, Manchester".) and her mother was Anita "Annie" Buckley Parkinson née Barclay, who was born in Buenos Aires. (Note: Anita "Annie" Buckley Parkinson née Barclay (Buenos Aires 25 February 1864 – Manchester 25 April 1918). GRO index: Marriages Sep 1899 Barclay Anita Buckley and Parkinson Frank. Salford 8d 323. Deaths Jun 1918 Parkinson Annie B 54 Prestwich 8d 366. The death certificate says: "Twenty fifth April 1918 at Green Mount, Bury New Road, Prestwich. Annie Buckley Parkinson, aged 54 years, wife of Frank Parkinson, who was of independent means. Cause of death: gradual cardiac muscle failure, certified. Present at the death: Frank Parkinson, widower of the deceased".) Her parents were married in a nonconformist chapel. (Note: Manchester, England. Nonconformist births and baptisms 1758-1912. Quote: Nancy Broadfield, father Frank Parkinson manufacturer, Mother Annie Buckley Barclay. Born Jan 23 1904 at Greenmount, Prestwich. Baptised 1 May 1904.) (Note: 1911 England Census for Nancy Parkinson, Green Mount, Prestwich, Greater Manchester. Quote: Number of rooms in house: 13.)

Parkinson was born in her paternal grandfather's thirteen-room villa ."Green Mount", Prestwich, and baptised at Higher Broughton and Singleton Mission Hall. (Note: Nancy Broadfield Parkinson (Prestwich 23 January 1904 – St Marylebone 10 December 1974). GRO index: Births Mar 1904 Parkinson Nancy Broadfield Prestwich 8d 470. Deaths Dec 1974 Parkinson Nancy Broadfield. Birth 23 JA 1904 St Marylebone 14 2166. She was named after her paternal grandmother whose maiden name was "Broadfield" Her birth certificate says: "Twenty third January 1904 at Green Mount, Prestwich. Nancy Broadfield Parkinson, daughter of Frank Parkinson (towel manufacturer) and Annie Buckley Parkinson, formerly Barclay. The informant was Frank Parkinson, father, of Green Mount, Prestwich".) (Note: Manchester, England. Nonconformist births and baptisms 1758-1912. Quote: Nancy Broadfield, father Frank Parkinson manufacturer, Mother Annie Buckley Barclay. Born Jan 23 1904 at Greenmount, Prestwich. Baptised 1 May 1904.) She had two siblings: Mary Barclay Parkinson who died of measles, aged 7 years, (Note: Mary Barclay Parkinson (Manchester 17 November 1900 – Manchester 10 January 1908). GRO index: Births Dec 1900 Parkinson Mary Barclay Prestwich 8d 434. Deaths Mar 1908 Parkinson Mary Barclay 7 Prestwich 8d 342. The death certificate says: "Tenth January 1908 at Green Mount, Prestwich. Mary Barclay Parkinson, aged 7 years.Daughter of Frank Parkinson, towel manufacturer. Cause of death, measles, 8 days, heart failure, certified. Frank Parkinson, father, present at the death".) and Harold Barclay Parkinson. (Note: Harold Barclay Parkinson (Broughton 5 January 1908 – Northampton 24 December 1996). GRO index: Births Mar 1908 Parkinson Harold Barclay Salford 8d 68. Deaths 1995 Parkinson Harold Barclay 5JA1908 Northampton 6701D 88) She attended Harrogate Ladies' College between September 1916 and February 1923, when the school was under the headship of the Wesleyan educational pioneer Elizabeth Wilhelmina Jones. The 1921 census finds her, an orphan aged 17, boarding at the college. (Note: https://www.ancestry.co.uk/search/collections/63150/records/28837220 1921 England Census for Nancy Parkinson. Harrogate College]. Quote: Nancy Parkinson, pupil, age 17 years 5 months, parents both dead, born Manchester. Boarding whole-time.) She matriculated at Bedford College for Women at the University of London in 1923, graduating with a BSc degree in pure mathematics, zoology and botany. (Note: London, England, Royal Holloway and Bedford College Student Registers, 1849-1931, page 1873, date 1923])

Parkinson's last address was 6 Hanover Terrace, in London, where she had lived since at least 1948. (Note: England & Wales, National Probate Calendar (Index of Wills and Administrations), 1858-1995, date 1974, page 67/6792 Quote Parkinson Nancy Broadfield of 6 Hanover Terrace London NW1 died 10 December 1974. Probate London 3 March 1975. £41725. 750106097E) (Note: Westminster, London, England, Electoral Registers, 1902-1970, page 18/152. Quote: Parkinson, Nancy B., 6 Hanover Terrace.) She died on 10 December 1974, and left £41,725 (equivalent to £395,584.72 in 2025). (Note: England & Wales, National Probate Calendar (Index of Wills and Administrations), 1858-1995, date 1974, page 67/6792 Quote Parkinson Nancy Broadfield of 6 Hanover Terrace London NW1 died 10 December 1974. Probate London 3 March 1975. £41725. 750106097E)

== Career ==
The 1939 electoral roll finds Parkinson living at 87 Sherwood Court, Seymour Place, London. (Note: London, England, Electoral Registers, 1832-1972, page 396. St Marylebone, London.) In the same year, the 1939 Register reveals Parkinson visiting her alma mater Bedford College for Women, "organising secrets". (Note: 1939 England and Wales Register, University of London, page 6. Quote: Bedford College for women. Schedule 4/32. Parkinson, Nancy B. Visitor, born 23 January 1904. Single. Organising secrets.) She was controller of the British Council (Home Division) during the Second World War. This division was organised to assist refugees during the conflict. She oversaw the organisation of regional centres within the United Kingdom, which could arrange accommodation for refugees, and provide English language courses, other education, and cultural exchange. 365 centres were set up across 59 urban areas by 1943. Following the war, Parkinson remained in office to give support to international students and other visitors from abroad.

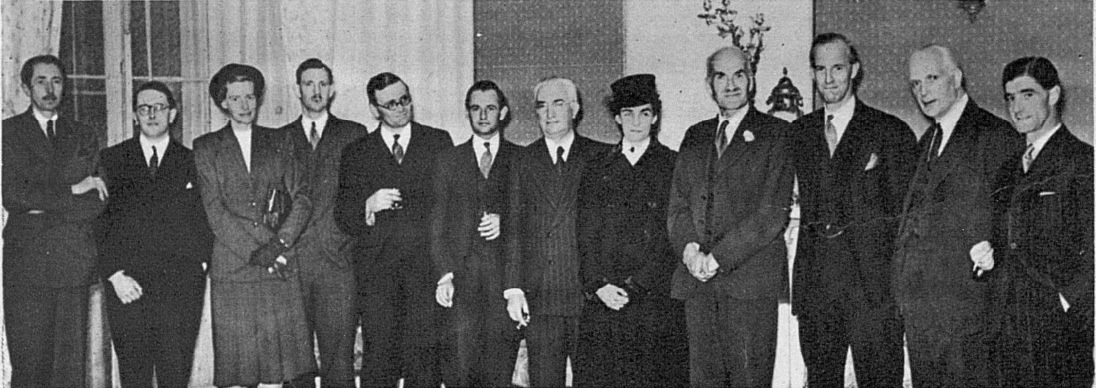
Parkinson (third from left) as a UNESCO delegate to Mexico, 1947

According to the British Council, Parkinson was "a tireless worker, fiercely loyal to her department, and equally willing to negotiate with government ministers and undertake more practical tasks ... Her work with our Home Division was outstanding". For example, when a choir of sixty singers from Hungary needed an escort across London at midnight, Parkinson ensured their safe arrival. Much of her work was done in the cause of international relations, on the understanding that if visitors to her country were treated and entertained well, then international "connections, understanding and trust" would be enhanced. The British Council also called her, "the driving force behind the establishment of UNESCO". During the regular conferences of the allied ministers of education, progress was "largely steered by Nancy and her determination to promote international cooperation in education". In 1947, Broadfield was a UNESCO delegate to Mexico. At the 1959 Commonwealth Education conference at Oxford, 100 international delegates attended. Of those, the only female delegates were four women of the United Kingdom delegation, which included Parkinson who was at that time controller of the British Council Home Division.

== Awards and tributes ==
In the 1938 Birthday Honours, Parkinson was awarded the Order of the British Empire (OBE) when she was honorary secretary to the Hospitality Council of the National Union of Students in London. That award was upgraded in the 1946 New Year Honours when she was made Commander of the British Empire (CBE), as director of the Home Division of the British Council. In the 1965 New Year Honours, as controller of the British Council's Home Division she was made Commander of the Order of St Michael and St George (DCMG), "in honour of her 30 years' exceptional service to the British Council". According to Hewlett (1981) she was "the first woman other than the Queen to achieve [the] distinction of Dame Commander of the Order of Michael and St George". At the reception following Parkinson's DCMG award, her "tireless energy, skilful negotiations and kindness to colleagues and ... visitors" was noted. The British Council commented, "It is not easy to be a woman in an organisation where almost all the senior staff are men. Perhaps you can only hold your own by being just that little bit better than most.
