= Crossan =

Crossan is a surname. Notable people with the surname include:

- Clarence K. Crossan (1876–1960), American Republican politician
- Dalton Crossan (born 1994), American football running back
- Dave Crossan (1940–2019), American football offensive lineman
- Denis Crossan, British cinematographer
- Diana Crossan (born 1949), New Zealand civil servant
- Eddie Crossan (1925–2006), Northern Irish association football player
- Eion Crossan (born 1967), New Zealand rugby union player
- Ernie Crossan (1915–2009), Australian cricketer
- Errol Crossan (1930–2016), Canadian association football player
- Gary Crossan (born 1971), Irish long-distance runner
- Jim Crossan (died 2023), Northern Irish association football player and manager
- Jim Crossan (Australian footballer) (1902–1979), Australian rules footballer
- Johnny Crossan (born 1938), Northern Irish author, radio sports analyst, entrepreneur and association football player
- John Dominic Crossan (born 1934), Irish-American religious scholar
- Keith Crossan (born 1959), Northern Irish rugby union player
- Mark Crossan, Irish Gaelic footballer
- Mura Masa (born 1996), British electronic music producer, real name Alex Crossan
- Paddy Crossan (1894–1933), Scottish association football player
- PJ Crossan (born 1998, Scottish association football player
- Rick O'Shea (born 1973), Irish radio personality, real name Paul Crossan
- Rob Crossan (born 1968), Canadian alpine skier
- Sarah Crossan (21st century), Irish author
