= George Mearns Savery =

English educator (1850–1905)

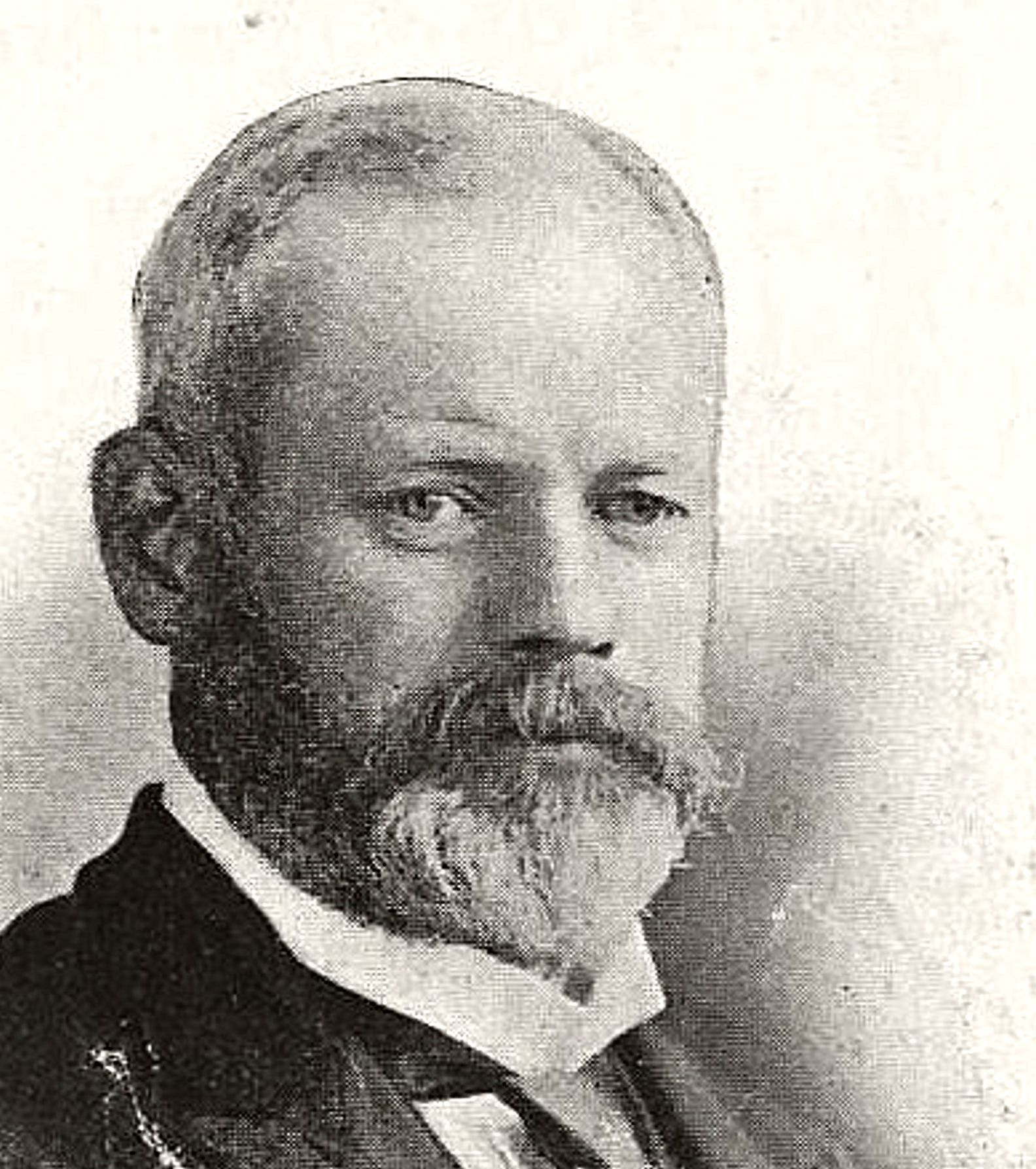
- Born: 2 March 1850; Kingston, Jamaica
- Died: 2 March 1905 (aged 55); Grange-over-Sands, England
- Occupation: Head teacher
- Years active: 1871–1899
- Known for: Founder of Harrogate Ladies' College; Headmaster of Ripon Road College, Bilton

George Mearns Savery (2 March 1850 – 2 March 1905) was an English headteacher. He was the principal of Ripon Road College, Bilton (later known as Harrogate College). He founded Harrogate Ladies' College, in Harrogate, North Yorkshire and, in collaboration with headmistress Elizabeth Wilhelmina Jones, expanded the school in the light of contemporary ideas about what a girls' school should be, planning "everything for the best ... which would do in the lives of women what public schools for boys [had] done for men".

== Background ==
Savery and his wife came from a Wesleyan Church family background. He was born in Kingston, Jamaica, (Note: George Mearns Savery (Kingston, Jamaica 2 March 1850 – Grange-over-Sands 2 March 1905). GRO index: Deaths Mar 1905 Savery George Mearns 55 Ulverston 8e 540.) the son of Reverend George Savery, a Wesleyan minister from Devon. (Note: George Savery (born Devonport 13 December 1815 – 21 March 1885).) His mother was Philippa Ann Savery (née West) from Cornwall. (Note: Philippa Ann Savery née West (St Breock 1821 – October 1891).) As a child Savery lived with his family in Vogue, Cornwall, surrounded by copper miners, and was the third of nine siblings. (Note: The children of George and Philippa Savery were: Ellen West Savery (born Jamaica c.1845), Annie West Savery (Jamaica c.1847–1926), George Mearns Savery (Jamaica 1850–1905), Philippa Edgecombe Jessup née Savery (1851–1933), William Henry Savery (1854–1919), James West Savery (born abroad 1856–1886), John Manly Savery (1859–1939), Samuel Servington Savery (1861–1938), Edith May Savery (1863–1915). GRO index: Births Mar 1846 Savery Ellen Taunton X 486. Marriages Sep 1868 Savery Annie West and Bishop Albert Wolstanton 6b 200. Deaths Mar 1926 Bishop Annie W. 79 Croydon 2a 460. Births Dec 1851 Savery Phillippa Penzance IX 207. Marriages Sep 1884 Savery Philippa Edgecombe Oxford 3a 1151. Deaths Sep 1933 Jessup Philippa E. 80 Brentford 3a 153. Births Jun 1853 Savery William Stoke D 5b 309. Deaths Sep 1919 Savery William H. 65 St.Thomas 5b 27. Deaths Jun 1886 Savery James West 29 Wycombe 3a 369. Births Mar 1859 Savery John Manly Sherborne 5a 379. Deaths Sep 1939 Savery John M. 80 Lothingland 4a 1427. Births Jun 1861 Savery Samuel Servington Reading 2c 342. Deaths Dec 1938 Savery Samuel S. 77 Cheltenham 6a 484. Births Jun 1862 Savery Edith Mary Reading 2c 351. Deaths Sep 1915 Savery Edith M. 53 Knaresbro 9a 127.) He was educated at Kingswood School, Bath, and Queen's College, Taunton. (Note: In the 1864–1865 academic year at Kingswood, Savery was in the same class as Robert William Perks and Richard Green Moulton.) On 20 June 1879 at the Temple Chapel, Taunton, Somerset, he married Caroline Amelia Sibly, daughter of Thomas Sibly. (Note: Thomas Sibly (Penzance 6 February 1813 – Taunton 9 November 1892).GRO index: Deaths Dec 1892 Sibly Thomas 79 Taunton 5c 217. Her grandfather was Reverend Nicholas Sibly, a Cornish Wesleyan minister, and her father was headmaster of the Wesleyan College, Taunton (which later became Queen's College), and alderman of Taunton Town Council. Thomas Sibley was one of the elected representatives at the 1878 Wesleyan Methodist Conference - the first W.M. Conference to admit Lay Representatives.) Savery and his wife had three children. (Note: Caroline Amelia Savery née Sibly (Taunton October 1847 – Taunton 26 January 1824) GRO index: Marriages Jun 1879 Savery George Mearns and Sibly Caroline Amelia, Taunton 5c 534. Caroline and George Mearns Savery had three children: George (born 1883), William (born 1885) and Laura (born 1889). Caroline Amelia Sibly was possibly a relative of Thomas Franklin Sibly..)

== Career ==
=== Academic career ===
Savery received his Bachelor of Arts degree from Lincoln College, Oxford in 1876, and his Master of Arts in 1880, being president of the Oxford Union Society in 1876. Former prime minister H. H. Asquith was a contemporary of Savery at the Oxford Union, and in 1920 still showed "an immediate and genuine interest" when Savery's name was mentioned by his former pupil, Sir Bertrand Watson, member of parliament for Stockton-on-Tees. Beginning while still an undergraduate, between at least 1871 and 1881 Savery was a classics tutor, senior master and housemaster at the Wesleyan College (now Queen's College, Taunton) in Somerset. In 1885 he was appointed headmaster of Ripon Road College, later called Harrogate College, at Bilton, Harrogate, living in-house with staff and pupils. He was headmaster of that boys' school until it closed in 1903. He was noted for his administrative capacity, and he was said by the Halifax Evening Courier to have had a "kindly disposition". He is remembered today for the 1893 foundation and initial proprietorship of Harrogate Ladies' College. (Note: Harrogate Ladies' College was renamed "Harrogate College" around 1960, but later reverted to its original name. Although financially successful, Savery's Harrogate College for boys was closed in 1899 (possibly due to Savery's illness). It is possible that a number of its pupils transferred to Clifton College, which soon became Clifton House School. In the early 20th century Harrogate Ladies' College was associated with a new Harrogate College for boys, which in due course closed. None of these had any connection with the current Harrogate College.)

=== Harrogate College for boys ===
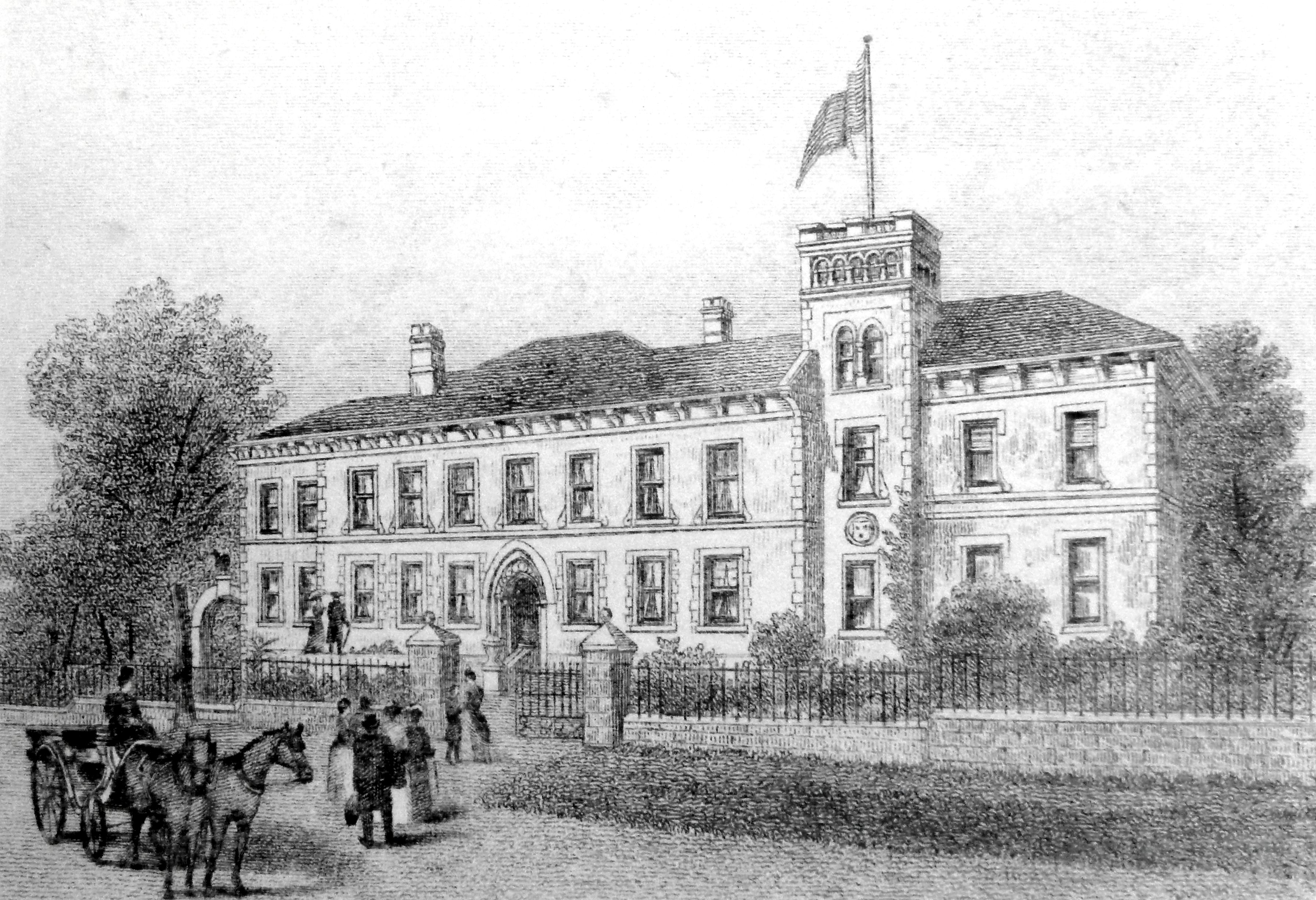
Harrogate College for boys, in the 1880s

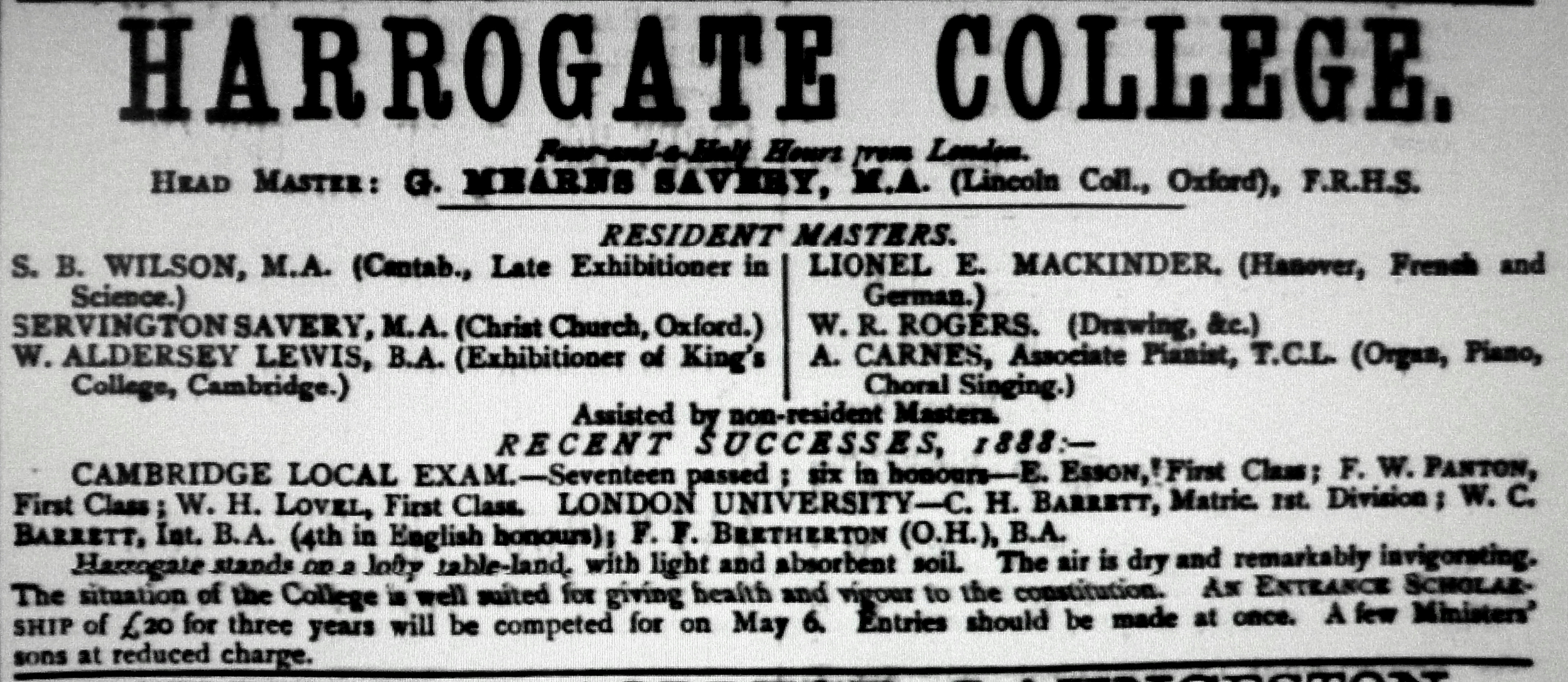
Ad for Harrogate College, 1889

This school was founded and built in 1863–1864 by William Henry Heigham, (Note: William Henry Heigham (1801 – 7 October 1883). GRO index: Deaths Dec 1883 Heigham William 82 Knaresbro' 9a 74.) on Ripon Road, Harrogate. The school had a roll of around eighty boys including boarders, and was a "substantial stone building with a tower and battlements", according to Hewlett. An early reference to the Harrogate College for boys was a news report of a cricket match between Ilkley College and Harrogate College, held in May 1875. Heigham died in 1883, and the school was headed by Savery who owned shares in it from 1885 to 1899 when he retired. According to a school advertisement of 1899, the school was doing well in that year, and it had a preparatory school in Strathmore House on Ripon Road, but it closed in 1903. On the subject of Harrogate College, Jean Walton suggested that "Illness in a boys' school could be totally disasterous (sic), once boys were sent home schools were often found for them and this happened to the boys' school".

In 1881 Savery's brother Samuel Servington Savery, aged 20 years, was attending this school as a scholar. By 1889, S.S. Savery had attained his Master of Arts at Christ Church College, Oxford and was teaching at the school. Savery was advertising in the Wesleyan Times in that year that Harrogate College boasted three Oxbridge-educated members of staff, besides S. B. Wilson, M.A., a graduate of the University of York teaching science, and other staff skilled in foreign languages, drawing and music. The same advertisement declared that "the situation of the College is well suited for giving health and vigour to the constitution", that the college was offering an entrance scholarship, and that the sons of Welseyan ministers might be offered a reduced fee. S.B. Wilson of Harrogate College shared Savery's connection with Taunton, in that he was a guest lecturer on the subject of carbon in that town in 1887. The school closed in 1903.

=== Harrogate Ladies' College ===
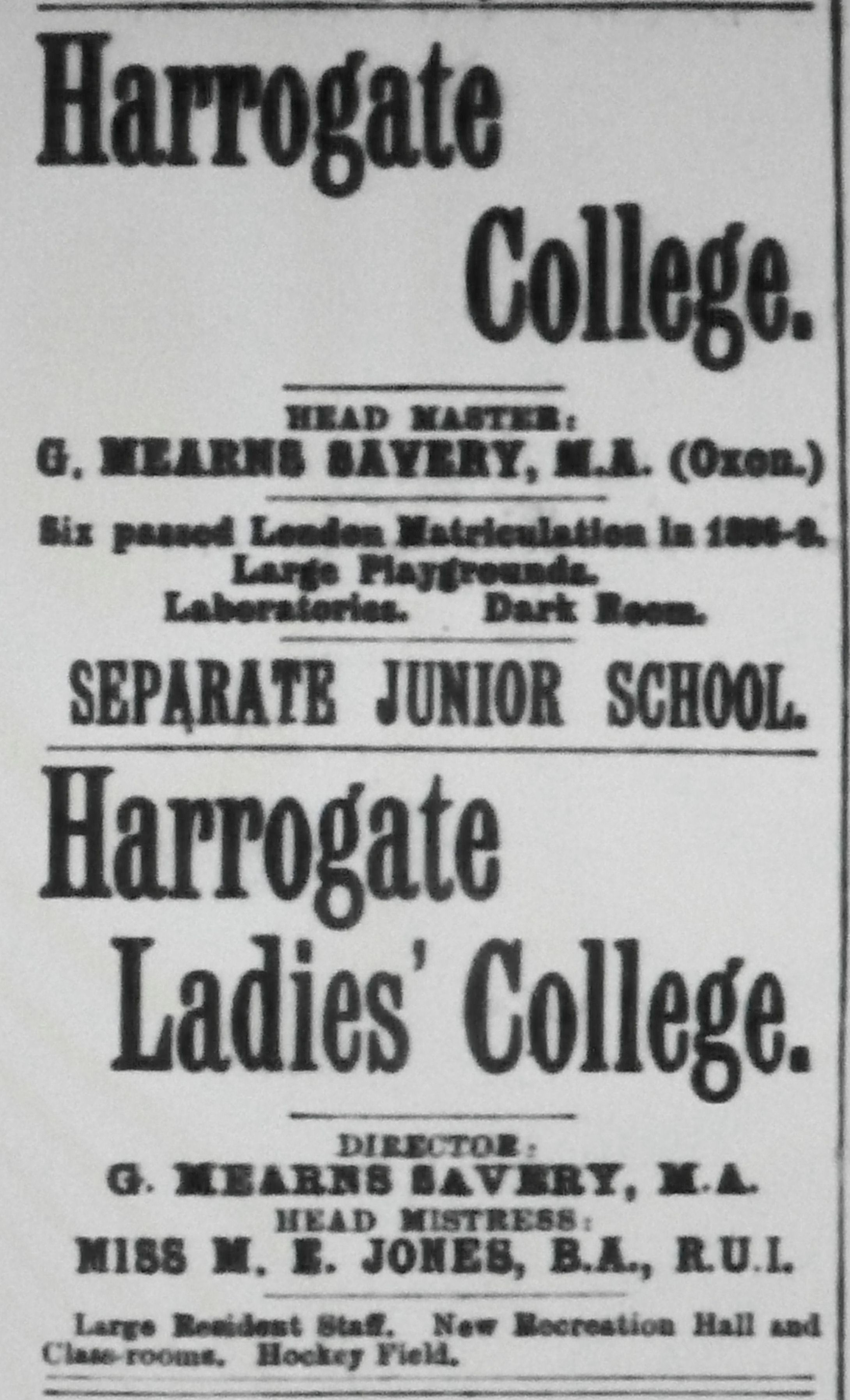
Schools ad, 1899

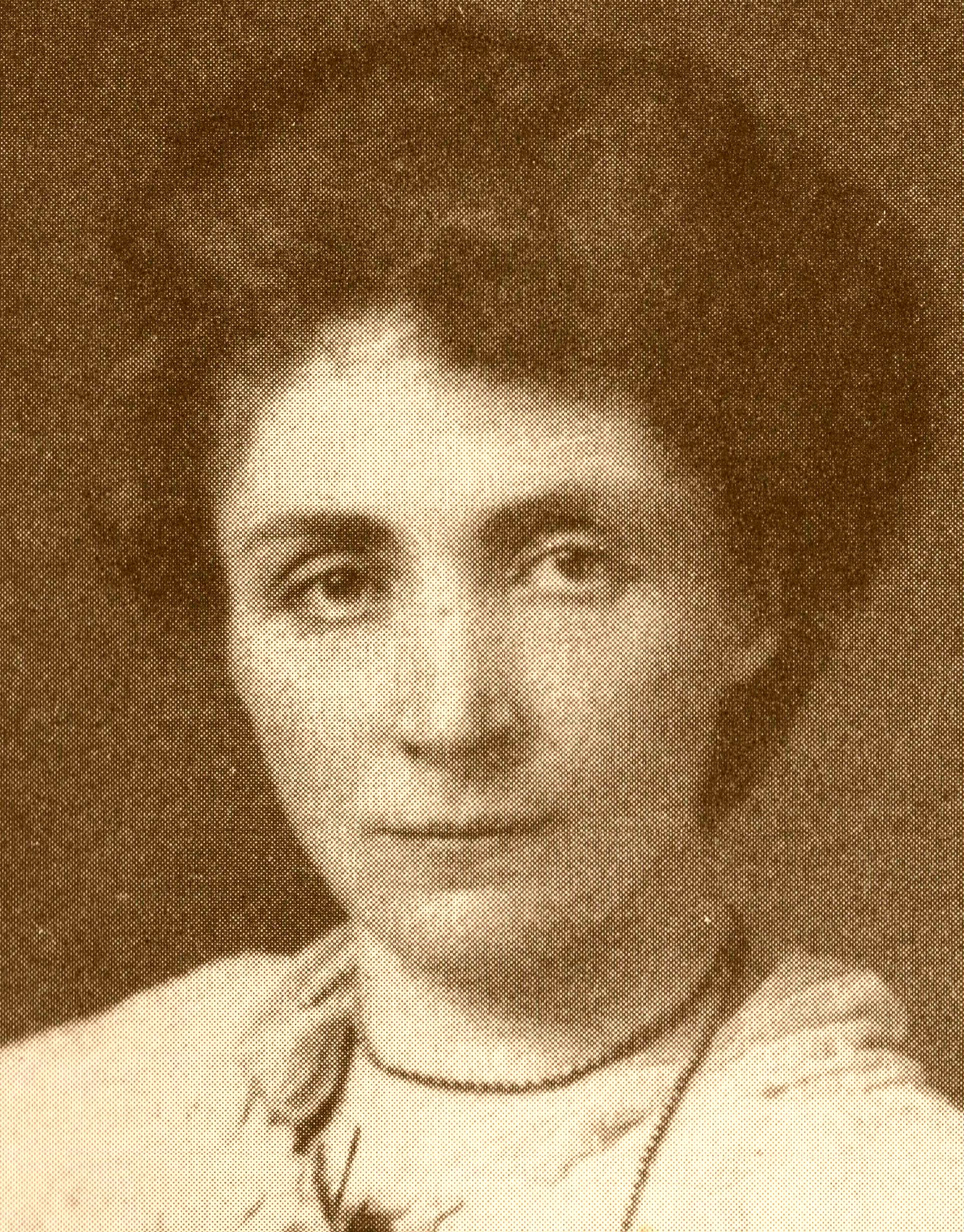
Headmistress M. E. Jones, c. 1890

The school was initially known as The Ladies' College, then Harrogate College. It was founded by Savery in 1893 in a private house under the headship of Betsy Field Hall, who ran the school until 1898, when it occupied Percy Lodge. The Yorkshire Post commented that it was, "the product of a pioneer mind, an inspired adventure in building ... [Savery was] the first to see in Yorkshire an opening for a girls' public school of the first class ... His distinction was that he saw it [in 1893]". In 1901 he planned a new school building in collaboration with Miss M. E. Jones. (Note: Elizabeth Wilhelmina Jones, known as M. E. Jones (c.1869 – December 1959). GRO index: Deaths Dec 1959 Jones Elizabeth W. 90 Eastbourne 5h 280. Jones was the daughter of Reverend J. W. Jones of Donaghpatrick, County Meath, Ireland.) She was an Ulster-born graduate of Queen's College, Belfast, a form mistress at Bradford Girls' Grammar School, then headmistress at Harrogate Ladies' College from September 1898 to 1935.

Ground was broken in 1902, and the building was opened on 17 May 1904. In this building, according to the Yorkshire Post, Savery and Jones planned "everything for the best ... which would do in the lives of women what public schools for boys [had] done for men". A 1904 advertisement for the newly-housed school quoted a "fine lecture hall and classrooms, studio, laboratory, library, workshop, large gymnasium, pupils' sitting rooms, single bedrooms, 15 sound-proof music rooms, 10 tennis courts, hockey and cricket grounds, cycling path, gravel playgrounds etc."

As described the by Yorkshire Post, the ideals of Savery and Jones for the school were, "advancement in scholastic matters, the promotion of physical well-being, [and] the infusion of a fine moral and spiritual tone". They rejected ideas of "domination of ideas for the education of boys", the bluestocking, the hausfrau and the finishing school, in favour of potential female careers, "mental and moral training [and] personal responsibility", public duty, and home-making including "pride in the beauty and order of the home". Those ideals of 1901 would, of course, be superseded in certain respects in later years.

== Public service, associations and other duties ==
In Harrogate Town Council Savery served as councillor for West Ward, and he served on Harrogate United District School Board. He was a Fellow of the Royal Horticultural Society, and at one point he was chairman of Harrogate Literary Society. In Leeds in 1887, in connection with the Wesleyan Institute, Savery gave a lecture on "The Art of Reading and Speaking". The Methodist Times reported that the lecture was "highly entertaining, abounding, as it did, in illustrations of various styles of speaking, given with remarkable skill".

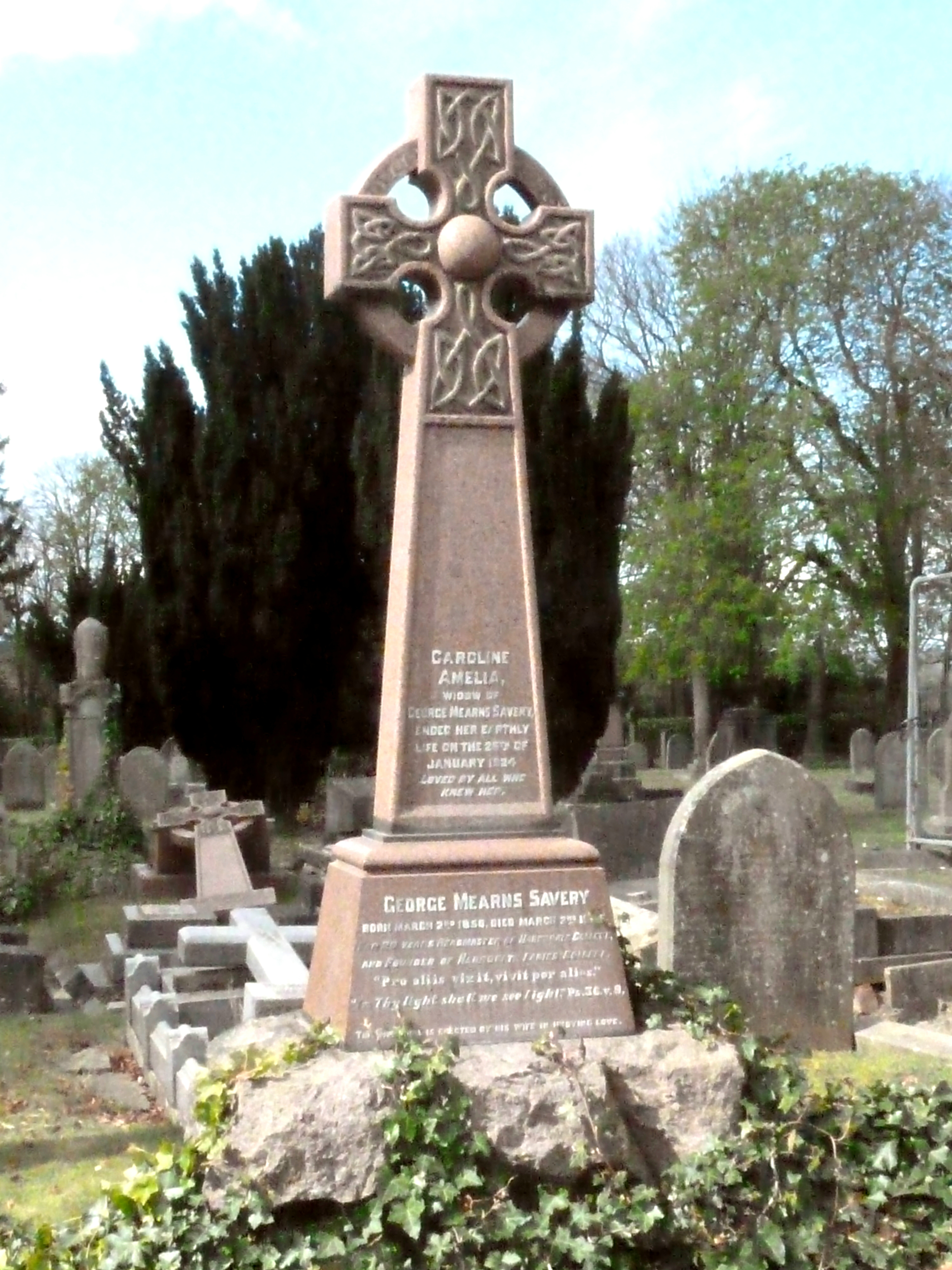
Savery's gravestone

== Death ==
When Savery died of pulmonary tuberculosis at Grange-over-Sands after an illness of over a year, (Note: Death certificate of George Mearns Savery. It says, "Second March 1906 [at] Thornfield Villa, Grange over Sands U[rban] D[istrict], George Mearns Savery, 55 years, M.A. Oxford. Pulmonary tuberculosis 1 year 3 months. Bronchitis 28 days. Certified. Edith Mary Savery, sister, present at the death, (of Bramcote, Scarborough)".) he left £18,994 gross (equivalent to £1,996,786.66 in 2025). He was buried at Harlow Hill Cemetery, Harrogate. The Yorkshire Post (1933) said that his early death "denied him a view of the full fruition of his plans and robbed education of a great pioneer". The Bath Chronicle and Weekly Gazette said, "he was one of the pioneers of the education of girls in this country. Former Harrogate College pupil Bertrand Watson declared that his life was influenced by Savery, who was a "powerful personality and one to whom the term disciplinarian could be applied, but in him we saw the ideal of perfect justice being lived up to most successfully".
