= Lottie McGuinness =

British para powerlifter

Personal information
- Full name: Charlotte McGuinness
- Born: 19 October 2001 (age 25) Harrogate, England
- Education: Leeds Trinity University

Sport
- Sport: Para powerlifting

Achievements and titles
- Paralympic finals: 2024
- Personal best: 110 kg (240 lb)

Charlotte McGuinness (born 19 October 2001) is a para powerlifter, who competed at the 2024 Summer Paralympics.

== Career ==
McGuinness started competing in swimming, having been inspired by the 2012 Paralympic Games in London. She was encouraged by Ellie Simmonds to attend the World Dwarf Games. McGuinness took up Paralympic powerlifting in 2019; initially, she could lift 40 kilograms (88 lb). During the COVID-19 pandemic, McGuinness built a gym in a barn next to her home in the Yorkshire Dales. At the 2021 Para Powerlifting World Cup, she came third overall and second in the junior event, lifting 74 kilograms (163 lb).

In 2023, McGuinness won a silver medal at the World Cup. That year, McGuinness competed at the 2023 World Para Powerlifting Championships, finishing ninth.

At the 2024 World Cup event in Tbilisi, McGuinness came fifth with a personal best lift of 104 kilograms (229 lb). Following the event, she qualified for the under-55 kg event at the 2024 Summer Paralympics. At the Games, she finished fourth with a best lift of 105 kilograms (231 lb). In July 2025, McGuinness broke the British under-61 kg record twice at the Irish Invitational Para Powerlifting Competition. Her best lift was 110 kilograms (240 lb). That month, she finished second at the British Championships behind Olivia Broome, with a best lift of 108 kilograms (238 lb). She was selected to compete at the 2025 World Para Powerlifting Championships, where she was 10th in the under-55 kg event with a best lift of 106 kilograms (234 lb).

== Personal life ==
McGuinness is from Harrogate, Yorkshire. She attended Harrogate Ladies' College where she won medals in swimming, athletics, field hockey and basketball. She studied sport and exercise science at Leeds Trinity University. McGuinness has worked part-time for the NHS.
