= Grote Kerk, Dordrecht =

Coordinates: 51°48′51″N 4°39′36″E

Church of Our Lady, Dordrecht
- Grote of Onze-Lieve-Vrouwekerk
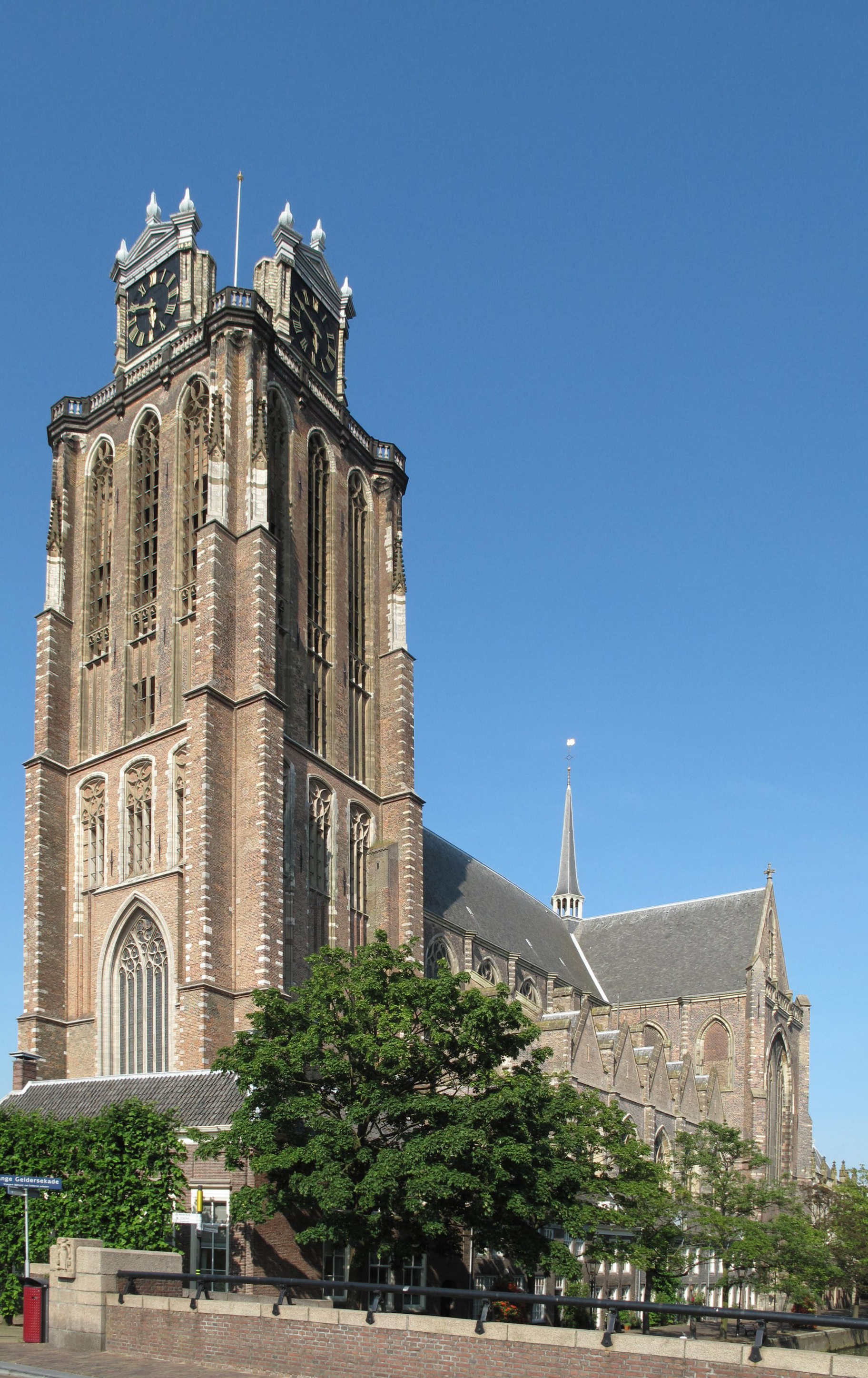
- The tower of the church
- Church of Our Lady, Dordrecht
- Country: Netherlands
- Denomination: Dutch Reformed
- Previous denomination: Roman Catholic

Architecture
- Functional status: Church
- Style: Brabantine Gothic

The Grote Kerk of Dordrecht, officially the Church of Our Lady (Dutch: Onze-Lieve-Vrouwekerk, or Grote Kerk) is a large church in the Brabantine Gothic style, and the largest church in the city. It was built between 1284 and 1470, though some parts are newer. It became a Reformed Protestant church in 1572, and remains an active church, being owned by the Protestant Church in the Netherlands.

== History ==
Early records of the church are scarce. A chapel in Dordrecht is mentioned in a chapter of 1122, although the exact date of when the church was established is unknown. In 1986, excavations in the church uncovered the remains of a thirteenth-century Romanesque apse belonging to the previous building, with the interior being 9 meters in width. The oldest standing part of the church is the 'Mariakoor', or St. Mary's Quire, built between 1284 and 1285.

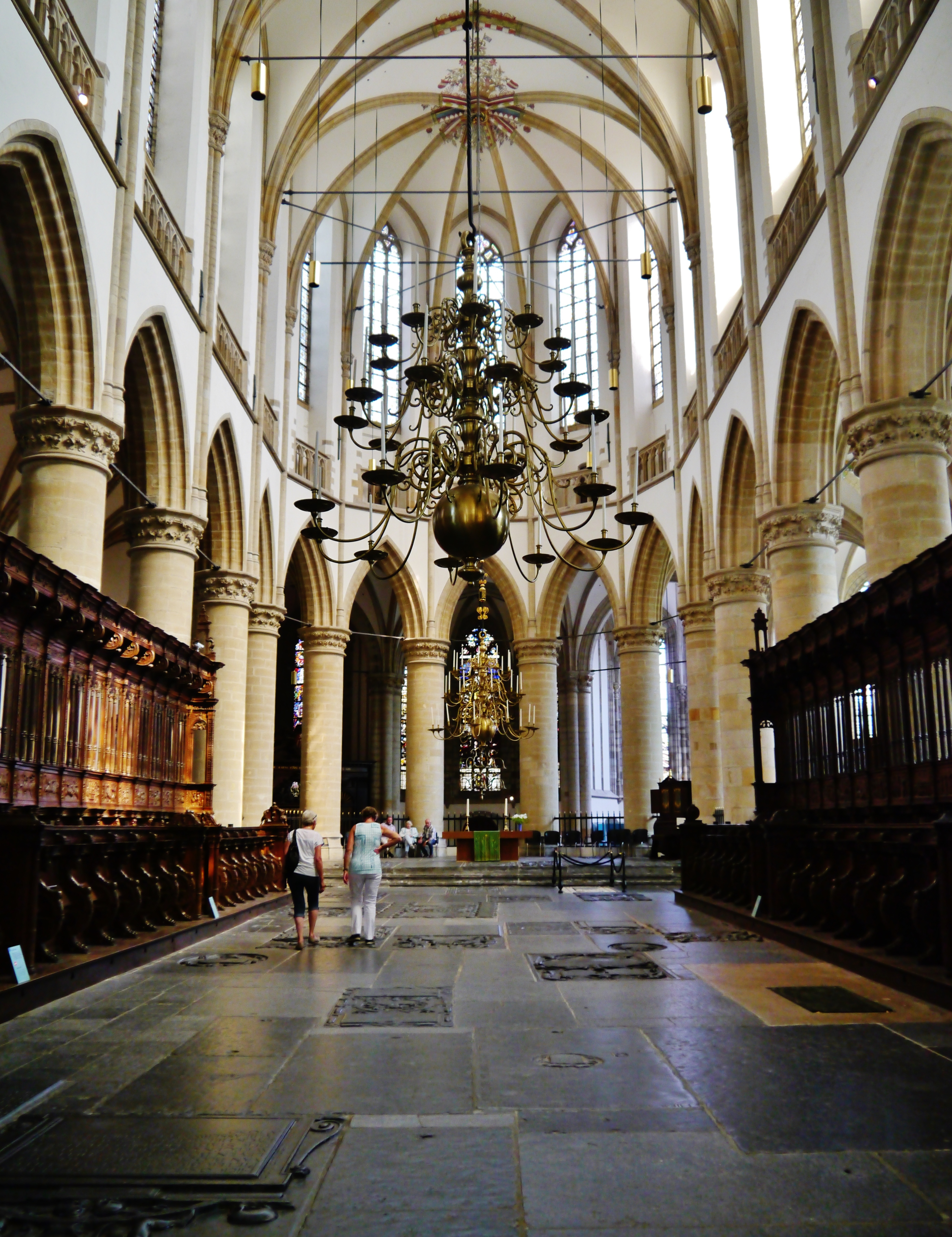
The Quire of the Grote Kerk. The Renaissance choir stalls were made between 1538 and 1542

In 1367, the parish church of Our Lady was elevated to the status of a collegiate church, and the Romanesque building was demolished.

On June 29, 1457, a fire, which started in Kleine Spruistraat, spread quickly to other streets causing massive destruction, and the church was severely damaged. Everaert Spoorwater, an architect from the southern Netherlands, led the reconstruction in the Brabantine Gothic style. The ceiling mostly consists of rib vaults, except for the Mariakoor which contains a lierne vault.

The choir stalls were made between 1538 and 1542.

The church was ransacked by the Geuzen in 1572, when the building was whitewashed, the statues destroyed, and the altars desecrated. The building was converted into a Protestant church and it remains one today.

== Tower and Clock ==
The tower was originally begun in 1339, however it was severely damaged, along with the church, in the city fire of 1457. Originally meant to be capped with a stone octagon and spire (similar to Utrecht Cathedral), due to the soft Dutch soil causing the tower to lean, it was left unfinished by 1506. The tower was restored from 1953 to 1973, when subsidence was halted.

In 1626, it was capped with four Baroque clock faces, and a small roof. The clock mechanism was made by Jan Janszoon in 1624. It was converted into a pendulum clock in 1663

The tower contains 275 steps to the top, and for a small fee can be climbed by visitors.

== Bells ==
The bells of the current building are first mentioned in 1460, and there are currently 67 bells.

In 1966 a carillon was gifted to the church, hanging alongside a medieval bell of 1460 dedicated to St. John.

Six of the carillon bells can be swung including the bourdon, the largest swinging bell in the Netherlands, weighing 10 tons (9830 kilograms) and cast by Eijsbouts in 1999. The bells can be rung both by hand (with ropes) and electronically (with motors).

In 2020, the church installed ten additional bells hung for change ringing, which are the first peal of change ringing church bells in the Netherlands, and the heaviest such peal in mainland Europe. The lightest six bells were newly cast for the church in 2020, by Emanuele Allanconi of Crema, Italy. The heaviest four bells came from the redundant church of St. Mary, Harrogate, England and were cast by John Taylor & Co in 1915.

== Gallery ==
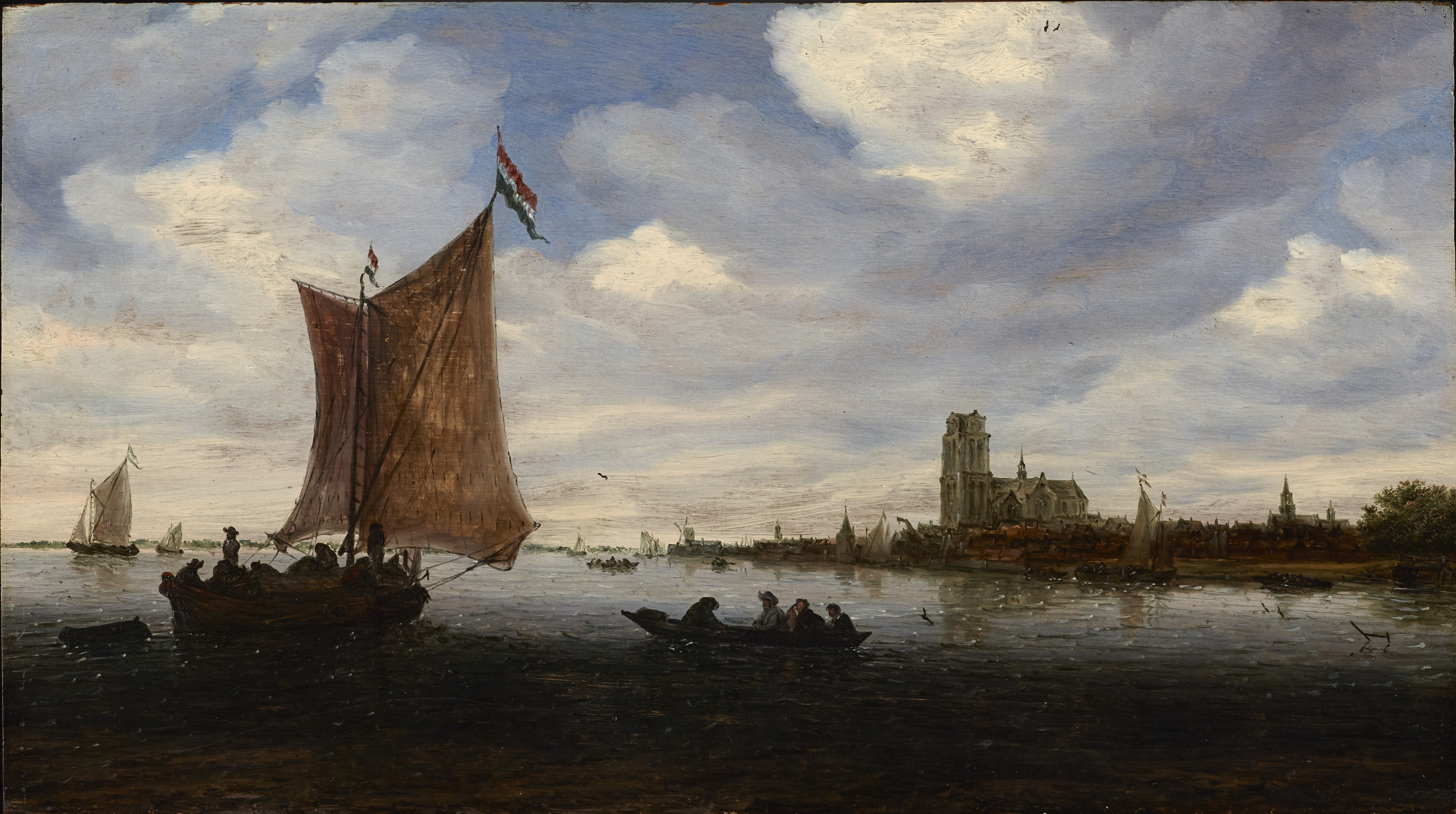
Salomon van Ruysdael, View of Dordrecht, ca. 1660, showing the church dominating the city skyline

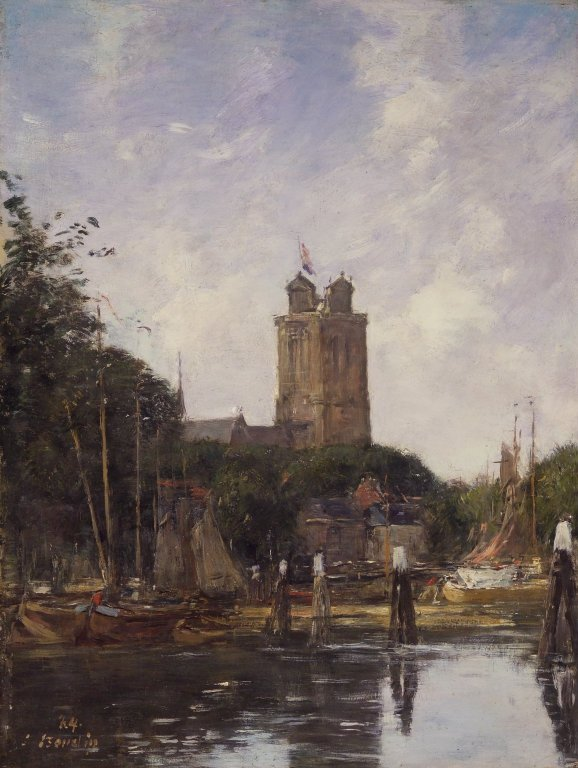
Brooklyn Museum - Dordrecht, the Grote Kerk from the Canal - Eugène Louis Boudin - overall

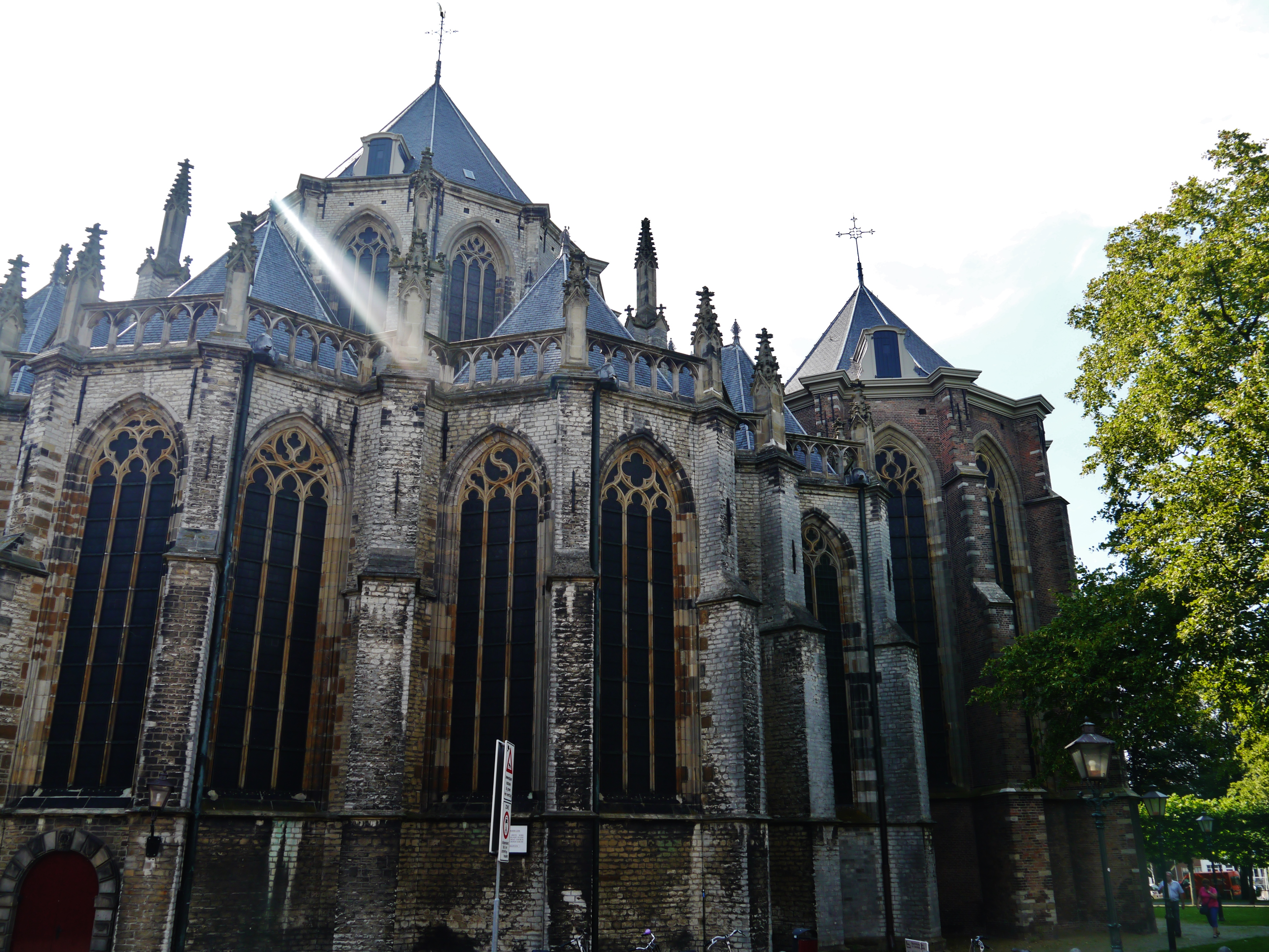
The back of the church
