= Age of majority (England) =

Age at which persons are considered adults in England

The age of majority in England is 18, having been reduced from 21 by the Family Law Reform Act 1969. At that age persons are considered to acquire capacity in full to enter into legally binding contracts (thus to hold a credit card and take out a loan), to vote in elections, to buy tobacco and cigarettes and have a tattoo.

There are some things a person cannot do at age 18. For example, one must be 21 to adopt a child (unless one is the mother or father of the child).

== Capacities at earlier ages ==
=== 10 ===
At the age of 10, in England a child is deemed criminally responsible and may be tried in a court of law.

=== 11 ===
At the age of 11 a child may open a bank current account, but only with permission from a parent (until age 16). Children up to the age of 11 may be referred to a social worker and a children's hearing.

=== 12 ===
According to a guideline issued by the NSPCC, "children under 12 are rarely mature enough to be left alone for a long period of time".

=== 13 ===
At the age of 13 children may work part-time.

=== 16 ===
Persons are issued with a National Insurance number by the government.

With parental consent they may do things such as - join the British Army, Royal Navy or other associated roles, and drink beer, wine, cider or mead with a meal in a restaurant, for example. Without parental consent, they may leave home, work in full-time employment, engage in consensual sexual activity (with anyone aged 16 or over), smoke (but not purchase) cigarettes, as well as have full capacity over medical treatment and decisions associated, obtain a licence to drive certain vehicles, obtain an adult passport and open a bank account. At age 16, a person also finishes school, (Note: However in England (unlike other UK nations (Scotland, Wales and Northern Ireland), where a person can leave education; without additional requirements), since 2015, there is a requirement that in England those aged 16 or 17 be either employed in full-time work or enrolled in a further education institution, such as college (for example), after finishing school (the school-leaving age is 16 throughout the United Kingdom).) and can therefore choose to enter into and begin education at further education institutions (such as, college, for example).

The NSPCC suggests 16 as the minimum age for babysitting.

=== 17 ===
At the age of 17 a person may apply for a driving licence to drive a car.

== History ==
During the medieval era and the era of feudalism, in England the age of majority for males was 21 and for females 14 if married and 16 if single. The attainment of such an age was usually referred to as being "of full age". Thus wardship for males ended at the age of 21, on the obtaining by the ward of a "proof of age" writ, issued after a Proof of Age inquisition had obtained evidence from a jury of witnesses. Until that time a ward could be forced to marry a person of the warder's choosing, often his own child, and the resultant progeny would inherit the property formerly subject to the wardship at their father's death, usually regulated by the marriage settlement.
