= Jim Crossan (Australian footballer) =

Australian rules footballer

Personal information
- Full name: James Britten Hannah Crossan
- Born: 19 December 1902; Queenstown, Tasmania
- Died: 19 April 1979 (aged 76); Officer, Victoria
- Original team: Prahran
- Height: 168 cm (5 ft 6 in)
- Weight: 63 kg (139 lb)

Playing career^{1}
Years	Club	Games (Goals)
1928	South Melbourne	4 (4)
- ^{1} Playing statistics correct to the end of 1928.

James Britten Hannah Crossan (19 December 1902 – 19 April 1979) was an Australian rules footballer who played four games with South Melbourne in the Victorian Football League (VFL) during the 1928 season. As of 1929, he was playing with Port Melbourne Football Club.

Crossan later served in the Royal Australian Air Force in Papua New Guinea during World War II.
