= Duchy College, Harrogate =

Duchy College
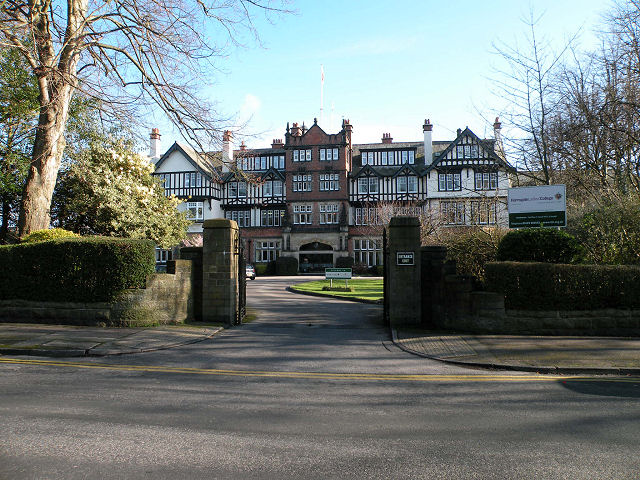

Location
- Clarence Drive; Harrogate, North Yorkshire, HG1 2QG; England; 53.996300°N 1.550970°W

Information
- Type: Private day and boarding
- Motto: Industria, Fide, Pietate (Work, Faith and Piety)
- Religious affiliation: Church of England
- Established: 1893
- Principal: Joanna Fox
- Gender: Girls; Boys (ages 2–11)
- Age: 2 to 18
- Enrolment: 640~
- Website: duchycollege.org.uk

Duchy College, formerly known as Harrogate Ladies' College, is a private boarding and day school located in the town of Harrogate, North Yorkshire, England. Founded as a girls' senior school in 1893, the college includes Highfield Prep School and educates girls from ages 2 to 18 and boys up to age 11. It is a member of the Girls' Schools Association and Allied Schools.

== History ==
The original Harrogate College was a boys' school. Its headmaster, George Mearns Savery, opened a girls' school in 1893, and developed it in collaboration with headmistress Elizabeth Wilhelmina Jones. The boys' school closed after Savery's death in 1903 and the girls' school initially kept the name of Harrogate College. In 1904, the girls' school moved into the present accommodation on the west side of Harrogate. In 1907 the school acquired a panel by sculptor Frances Darlington, depicting Sir Perceval's Vision of the Holy Grail which was fixed above the fireplace in the reading room.

From 1939 to 1945, the school was evacuated to Swinton Park, and after the Second World War moved back. Additional extensions that housed a library, a science block and a gymnasium were built later in the 1950s. Later, more buildings were constructed (a sports hall in the 1980s, an art room, and the Highfield Prep School). Gradually, houses on each side of Clarence Drive were acquired and were used as boarding houses. The pre-prep department, known as Bankfield, was opened in 1997, whilst the junior school, Highfield, opened in 1999.

Currently, the grounds, playing field, tennis courts, houses and gardens occupy about 28 acres (11 ha) of the Duchy Estate.

The college now consists of three divisions: Highfield Pre-School (boys and girls aged 2–4), Highfield Prep (boys and girls aged 4–11) and the main school (day and boarding girls aged 11–18).

== Academic performance ==
The 2023 results are:

- GCSE Results (2023): 57% achieved grades 9-7
- A Level Results (2023) 41% achieved grades A/A; 68% achieved grades A-B

== Pastoral care ==
As a Christian school, pupils are encouraged to attend chapel services but the school accepts pupils of "all faiths or none". The school has links with the local parish church St Wilfrid's Church. A school chaplain oversees pastoral care and spiritual aspects of the school curriculum. The College has its own health and wellness centre.

=== House system ===
Upon entry, pupils are placed into one of the four houses. Over the school year, the houses will compete in inter-house competitions.

==== Highfield ====
The junior school houses are named after four of the Yorkshire Dales.

- Nidderdale
- Wharfedale
- Wensleydale
- Swaledale

==== Senior school ====
The senior school houses are separate from boarding houses. They are named after prominent British female figures in history.

- Austen
- Franklin
- Nightingale
- Pankhurst

== Boarding ==
The school has a long boarding tradition and over half of senior school pupils are boarders. Full or flexible boarding is available to girls aged 10 and above. There are five boarding houses: Armaclare, Clarence, Lancaster, Lincoln, or Tower. The first four are situated in the heart of the campus. Tower House, which is similar to a university hall of residence and houses Upper Sixth girls, is located further away from the main school. Each house is overseen by a housemistress and full-time residential staff who look after boarders during after-school hours.

== Notable former pupils ==
- Genevieve Barr, actress
- Sheila Burnford, author
- Jane Carr (Rita Brunstrom), actress
- Joolz Denby, Gothic rock poet, novelist, artist and tattooist
- Claire King, actress
- Elspeth Candlish Henderson, WAAF
- Grace Hickling, naturalist
- Lottie McGuinness, Paralympian
- Anne McIntosh, politician
- Dame Nancy Broadfield Parkinson, controller of the British Council (Home Division) during the Second World War
- Ella Pontefract, writer
