= Ernest Moore (painter) =

English painter (1865–1940)

- Born: 6 July 1865; Barnsley, England
- Died: 16 September 1940 (aged 75); South Kensington, England
- Occupation: Painter

Ernest Moore (6 July 1865 – 16 September 1940) was an English painter born in Barnsley, South Yorkshire. His work was part of the painting event in the art competition at the 1932 Summer Olympics. His work was also displayed in the Hidden Art of Barnsley Exhibition at the Cooper Gallery, Barnsley from June to August 2014.
