= Frances Darlington =

British sculptor (1880–1940)

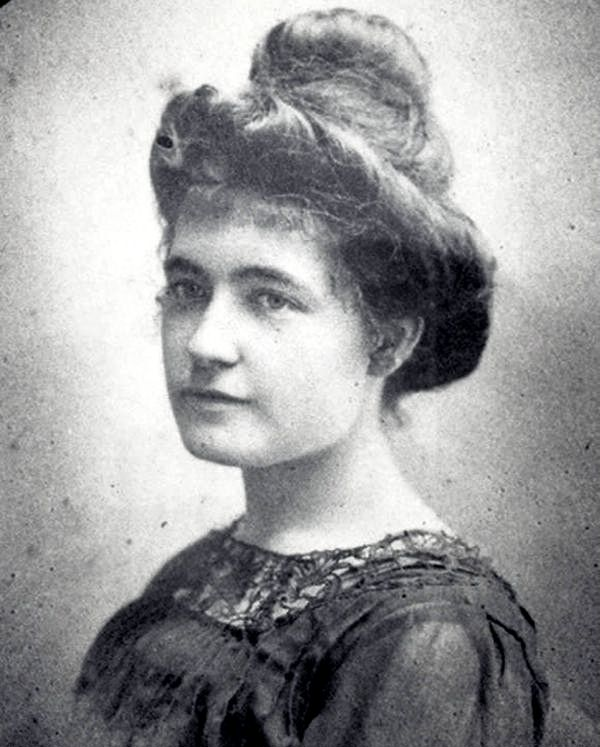
- Darlington, in 1897
- Born: Fanny Taplin Darlington; 3 February 1880; Headingley, West Riding of Yorkshire, England
- Died: 5 September 1940 (aged 60); Oxted, Surrey, England
- Education: Slade School of Art; Royal College of Art; Central School of Art and Design
- Known for: Plaster relief panels; bronze statuary
- Notable work: Decorative Scheme, Harrogate Theatre; Joseph Priestley statue, Birstall; Stations of the Cross, St Wilfrid's Church, Harrogate
- Movement: New Sculpture

Signature
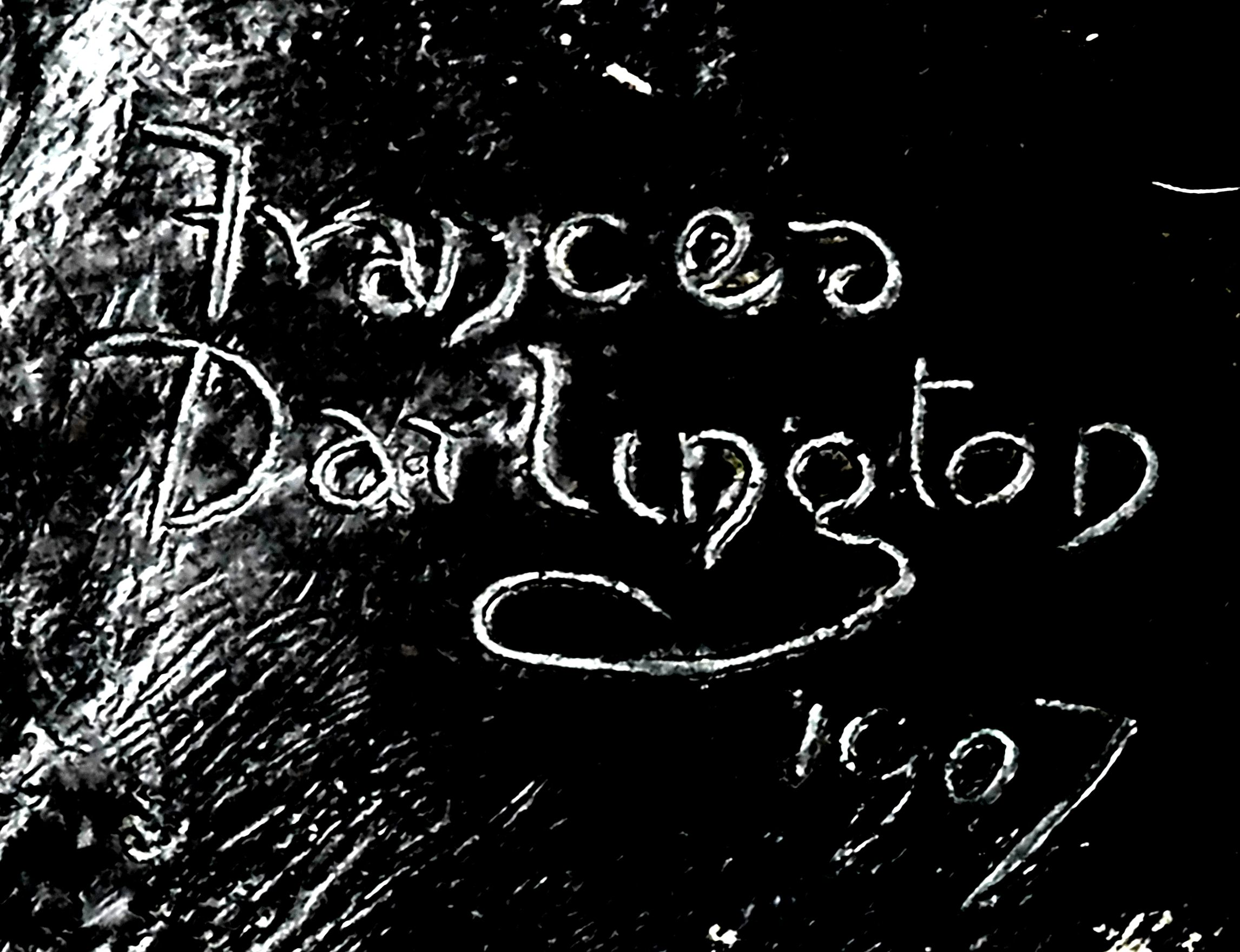

Frances Darlington (born Fanny Taplin Darlington; 3 February 1880 – 5 September 1940) was an English artist of the New Sculpture movement. In the early 20th century she created decorative panels, busts, garden statuary, medallions, group sculptures, and statuettes, in various materials including copper, bronze and painted plaster. She also designed a railway poster, featuring Ilkley.

She is known in Harrogate for her painted plaster relief panels, including her large frieze around the walls of the vestibule of Harrogate Theatre, and her Stations of the Cross in St Wilfrid's Church, Harrogate. A retrospective exhibition of her works, called Heavenly Creatures, was held in Harrogate's Mercer Art Gallery in 2003 and 2004.

== Personal life ==
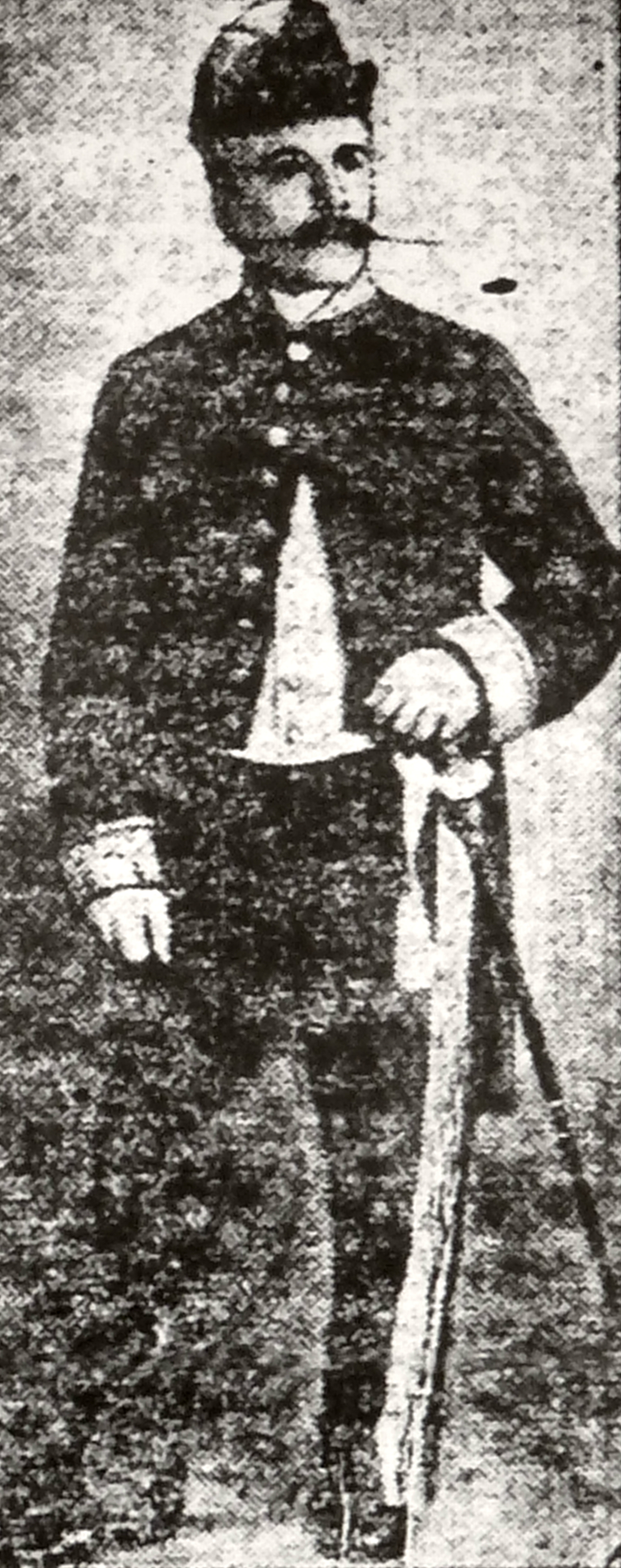
Latimer John De Vere Darlington

Darlington's paternal grandfather was solicitor and justice of the peace John Darlington, (Note: Odard de Dutton, 1st Lord of Dutton (c. 1046 – c. 1086). Darlington's father and grandfather believed that they were descended from Rollo, the first duke of Normandy, also from Odard, 1st Lord of Dutton, Cheshire and from an ancestor in the retinue of Edward the Black Prince, which permitted his descendants the use of five feathers as a crest to their coat of arms. However, Darling was descended on the paternal side from an old Cheshire family from Chester. A branch of that family had emigrated to Pennsylvania in the mid-18th century, so that she was a distant cousin of the botanist Dr William Darlington and the brothers Isaac and William Darlington, who were Pennsylvania judges.) (Note: John Darlington (c. 1808 – 18 September 1891). GRO index: Deaths Sep 1891 Darlington John 83 Wharfedale 9a 95 .John Darlington "had much to do with the arrangement of the Bradford exhibits in the Paris Exhibition of 1855". For that deed, a banquet and presentation were given in his honour by Titus Salt.) who managed the Leeds and West Riding Bank in Bradford, and later lived at Shipley Hall, Shipley. He was the first secretary of the Bradford chamber of commerce.

Darlington's father, born in 1849 at Shipley Hall, was the Harrogate, Bradford and Ilkley solicitor Latimer John De Vere Darlington, (Note: Latimer John De Vere Darlington (1849–1909). GRO index: Births Dec 1849 Darlington Latimer De Vere Bradford Y. 23 228. Deaths Sep 1909 Darlington Latimer J. de V. 59 Knaresbro' 9a 69.) who was the Belgian Consul for Bradford, and a Freeman of the City of London. Her mother was Ellen Emma née Taplin, (Note: Ellen Emma Darlington née Taplin (1851–1914), known as Emma. GRO index: Births Mar 1851 Taplin Ellen Emma Kensington III 404. Marriages Sep 1877 Darlington Latimer John De V., and Taplin (mis-transcribed as Paplin), Ellen Emma, Leeds 9b 494. Deaths Jun 1914 Darlington Ellen E. 63 Knaresbro' 9a 129.) daughter of Hugh Brown Taplin of Shaw House, Headingley, Leeds manager for the Royal Insurance Company. (Note: Hugh Brown Taplin (born West Drayton ca. 1836).) Emma Taplin was a painter, although untrained. Her parents married on 14 or 15 August 1877, at St Chad's Church, Far Headingley, the service being conducted by Bishop Ryan. Darlington had an elder brother, variety artist Hugh Latimer M. Darlington, (Note: Hugh Latimer M. Darlington (1878–1955). GRO index: Births Jun 1878 Darlington Hugh Latimer M. Leeds 9b 621. Deaths Mar 1955 Darlington Hugh L. M 76 Barrow F. 10b 219.) who had shell shock from the First World War, and a younger sister, Dorothy Marriott Darlington. (Note: Emma Dorothy Marriott Darlington (born ca. 1884), known as Dorothy. GRO index: Births Jun 1883 Darlington Emma Dorothy Leeds 9b 526)

Darlington was born in Headingley, Leeds, West Yorkshire, England, on 3 February 1880. (Note: Frances Fanny Taplin Darlington (1880–1940): GRO index: Births Mar 1880 Darlington Fanny Taplin Leeds 9b 547) In 1881 she was living with her grandfather, parents and elder brother in Shaw House, Shaw Lane, Headingley. She spent her younger years in Ilkley, and then – when not training in London – for most of the time between 1900 and 1910 she was living and working at her family home at Burland House, Harrogate, although between 1906 and 1908 she was living in Ilkley. She lived in the Harrogate area until 1926 when she removed from Knaresborough to London, where she lived at the Garden Studio, 8 Edith Villas, Kensington. She never married. She had "strong religious beliefs", and was a member of the congregation of St Wilfrid's Church, Harrogate. She won prizes in Yorkshire newspaper competitions for writing limericks. Darlington was shy of marriage, having observed its negative effect on the careers of women.

For part of her life, Darlington may have had a second home, because she is recorded living and working in both Yorkshire and Surrey. She left her London studio and moved to Dutton Cottage, Limpsfield, Oxted, Surrey, at the beginning of the First World War. She died of heart failure at Oxted on 5 September 1940, (Note: Frances Fanny Taplin Darlington (1880–1940): GRO index: Deaths Sep 1940 Darlington Frances 60 Surrey S.E. 2a 1129) when Oxted was bombed during the Second World War. Her will was proved at Llandudno on 18 November 1940, and she left £58 2s 11d (equivalent to £1,322.38 in 2025). The Ripon Museum Trust states that, "Despite selling work internationally and winning significant public commissions, Frances died in relative obscurity".

== Career ==
In spite of being shy of self-promotion, Darlington's reputation went before her. According to writer Ann Compton, Darlington was "Harrogate's first sculptor to be born and raised in the town". Her career spanned more than four decades until the late 1930s, but she started young. In May 1896, The Wharfedale & Airedale Observer quoted from the Bradford Argus:

Miss F. Darlington, who has not yet completed her fifteenth birthday, has contributed a couple of clay modelled works to the Bradford Museum which reflect the utmost credit on the young artist. She had previously on exhibit a well-executed bust of Sweet Ann Page but the new works are a bust of her father Mr L. Darlington (who is wearing his official coat), and figure of her younger sister. Both are admirably modelled.

Darlington trained as a sculptor and medallist, and she executed decorative panels, busts, garden statuary, medallions, group sculptures, and statuettes, in various materials including copper and bronze. In 1897 she was entered for one year as a sculpture student at the Slade School of Art, London, where she studied under George Frampton. Studying at the Slade at the same time were Edna Clarke Hall, William Orpen, and Augustus and Gwen John. As a student she lodged in Alexander House, in Kensington Gore. In 1901 she passed the Royal College of Art's entrance examination, having won the South Kensington Modelling Sketch Club Prize, and the second prize in the Gilbert Competition for modelling. After that, she studied at the Central School of Art and Design, South Kensington, under Édouard Lantéri, who was professor of modelling. She was possibly also taught by Gerald Moira, a mural painter and experimenter in decorative, coloured plaster in low relief. She remained in London until around 1900. By September 1901, the Bradford Observer was describing Darlington as "a sculptor of high reputation". Her first commission was a bust, which was titled Emily Bottomley, and executed in 1898. In July 1904 her sculpture, The Unforeseen, was featured on the front cover of the journal Womanhood. According to Pauline Rose, this exposure "established her professional status" and enhanced her reputation.

In 1911 Darlington had a home studio. She later had a studio in Knaresborough, which was the subject of a painting of c. 1920, The Sculptor's Loft, by Elise M. Bayley. (Note: Elise M. Bayley (c.1870–1955), artist.) The painting shows a statue of Darlington's niece Marjory, and a plaster cast of her bust of Robert Collyer. Between 1934 and 1939 she rented a studio at Wentworth Studios in Manresa Road, Chelsea. She experimented with polychrome, that is, colouring her sculptures. Some of her works appeared in The Illustrated London News and Colour magazine.

According to the University of Rochester, Darlington's "best work ... is in plaster relief". During her early career, Darlington worked on official commissions in the Yorkshire area, including relief panels and busts, "with religious and mythological subjects". Her models included friends and relatives. One of her models was her sister Dorothy Marriott Darlington. Due to her close connection as a worshipper at St Wilfrid's, it has been suggested that some of the figures in her Stations of the Cross reliefs in that church are portraits of members of its congregation.

Besides sculpture, Darlington also produced a railway-poster design, to be "placed at the various stations on the different railways", and to "bring before the public the advantage of Ilkley". She beat twenty-nine other competitors for first prize in that 1906 design competition. (Note: The library and archives of the National Railway Museum in York has been searched for Darlington's 1906 poster, but it has not yet been found.)

== Works ==
=== Early works ===
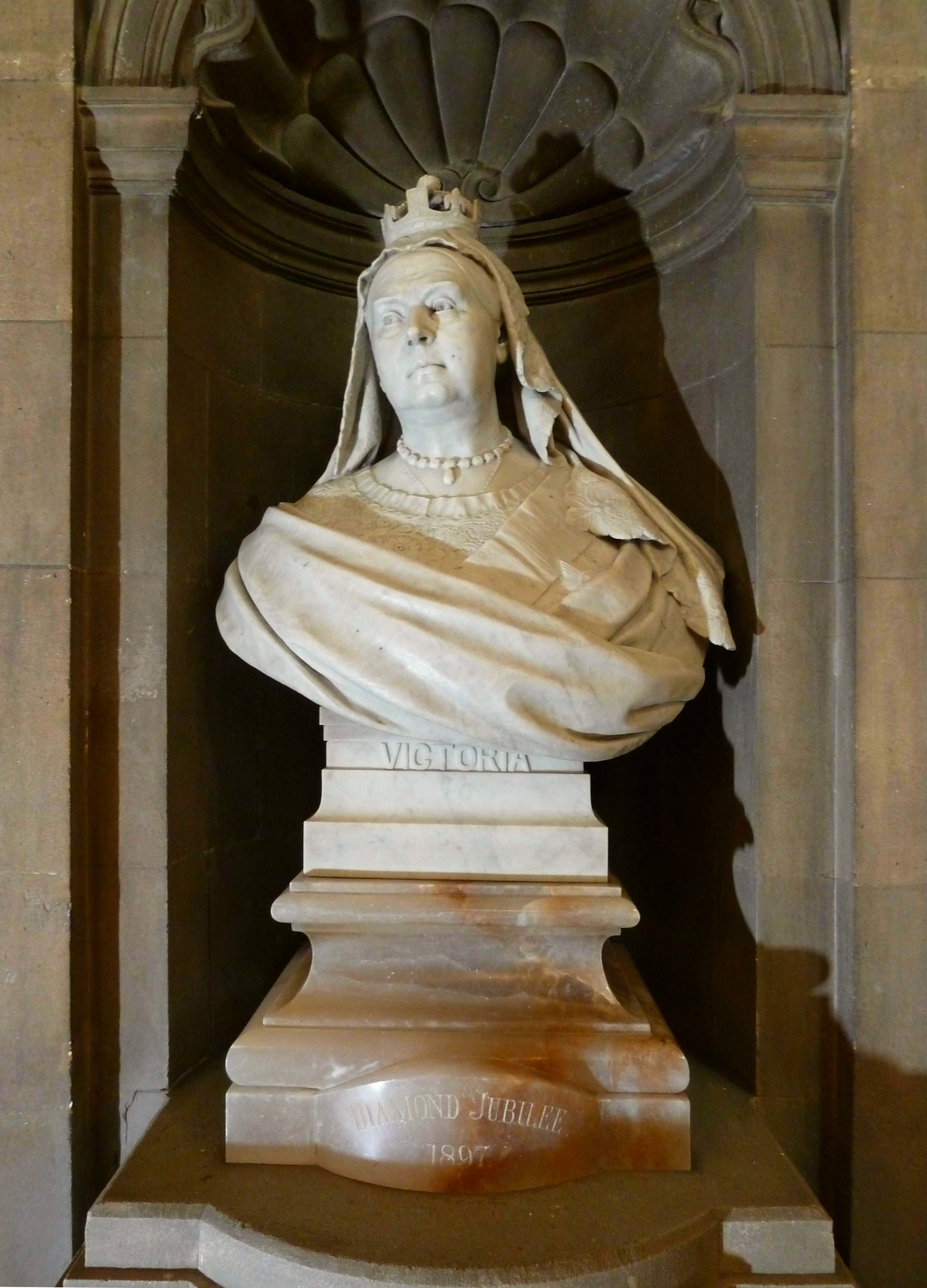
Queen Victoria, 1902

In 1896, before her formal training began, Darlington contributed Mr L. Darlington and Dorothy Marriott Darlington, a pair of clay busts for an exhibition at Bradford Museum. In the same year, her sculpture Sweet Anne Page was shown at Bradford Art Gallery. (Note: Sweet Anne Page may refer to the character in Shakespeare's Merry Wives of Windsor. The sculpture was shown at the gallery's earlier 19th century location (i.e. not the present location of Cartwright Hall).) One of Darlington's early works was a medallion portrait of the superintendent of Alexander House, Maude Palmer. Darlington had lived at Alexander House as a student.

The Maude Palmer commission was followed after her training at the Slade and the Royal College of Art by her marble Bust of Queen Victoria, for Morley Town Hall. The bust was unveiled on 8 December 1902, by mayoress Mrs Scarth, in commemoration of Queen Victoria's Diamond Jubilee. The cost was met by the remainder of the council's Diamond Jubilee fund. Darlington was present at the unveiling. Around 1903, Darlington completed her marble Bust of Sir Francis Cook, commissioned by Queen Alexandra for Alexandra House, "a charitable institution". Her next recorded work is The Little Sea Maiden (1905), which is now in the collection of Leeds Art Gallery. Her panel, Madonna della Rosa (1905), was illustrated in the Catholic Home Journal, which described it as "an excellent piece of work".

=== Sir Perceval's Vision of the Holy Grail (1907) for Harrogate Ladies College ===
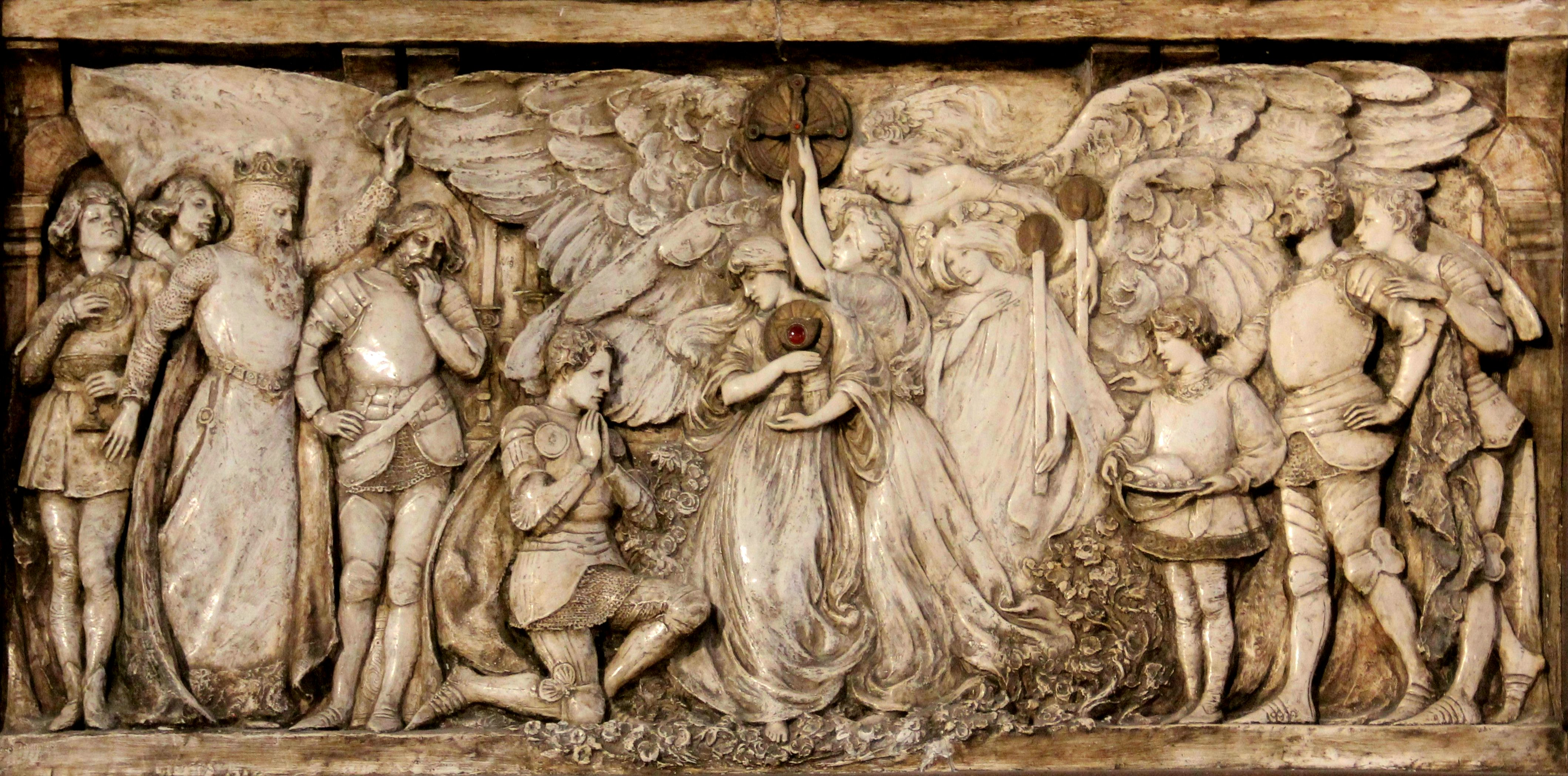
Sir Perceval's Vision, 1907

Early in 1907, the Leeds Mercury reported that Darlington's plaster bas relief of Sir Perceval's Vision of the Holy Grail, a decoration for a mantelpiece in the reading room of Harrogate Ladies' College, had been accepted for the Royal Academy Summer Exhibition. The 6-foot (1.83 m) wide panel featured twelve figures. The Sheffield Daily Telegraph said: it was "carefully composed and vigorously modelled". The Yorkshire Post commented, "There is some very good modelling in Sir Perceval and the Vision of the Holy Grail, though the difficulties of the composition are not entirely overcome, and there are some awkward lines". In 1907 the panel was at Harrogate Ladies' College, in the Hewlett Reading Room. It was later in St James' Church, Wetherby; the work was reported to be there in 1949. From the 1980s, the work has been displayed over the vestry door in St Mary the Virgin Church, Ingleton, North Yorkshire. (Note: As of 2024, Sir Perceval's Vision of the Holy Grail has been fixed above the vestry door in the chancel of St Mary the Virgin, Ingleton, North Yorkshire. See File:Sir Percevals Vision of the Holy Grail (27a).JPG.)

=== Rev. Dr Collyer and Andrew Carnegie (1907) for Ilkley Library ===
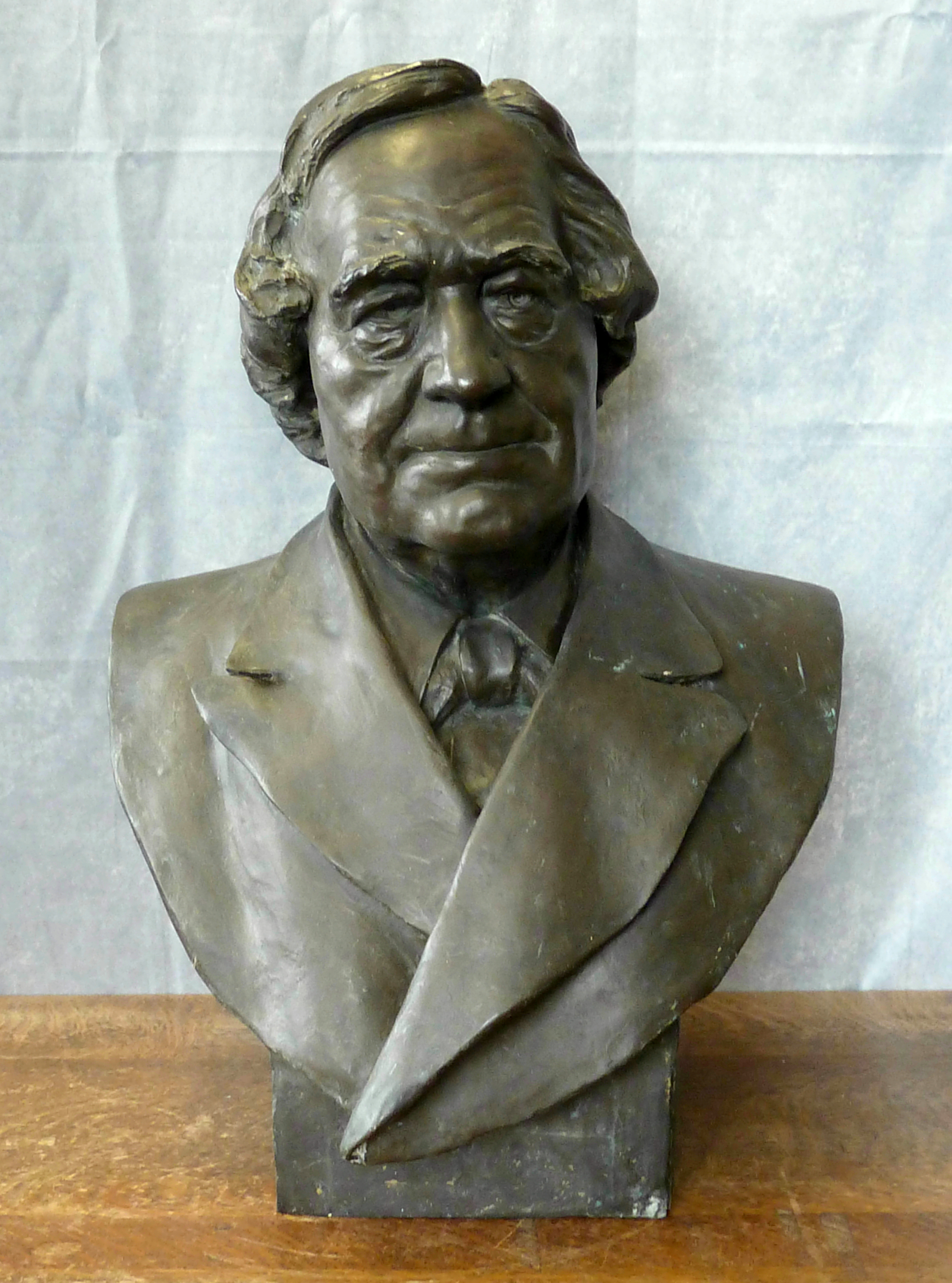
Rev. Dr Collyer, 1907

One of Darlington's works which drew public attention was the pair of life-sized bronze busts which were commissioned in 1906, and which Darlington completed in 1907, at a cost of 90 guineas (equivalent to £9,829 in 2025) for the Ilkley Public Library. One of the busts was a portrait of Reverend Dr Robert Collyer of New York, who had been a blacksmith in Ilkley when young. He had since been a benefactor to Ilkley and had donated 300 books to the new library. The other was of Andrew Carnegie, who donated £3,000 (equivalent to £312,027 in 2025) for the construction of the library in 1907. When the maquettes for the busts were offered for viewing, the Brighouse News said, "The representations are exceedingly life-like and natural, and should do much to increase Miss Darlington's reputation".

The library was opened, and the busts were unveiled, in the empty library in front of a large audience on 2 October 1907. The library was not to be furnished with shelves and books until the following spring, but the unveiling was put forward when Collyer visited England. At the opening, Collyer was presented with a gold key, (Note: The gold key presented to Robert Collyer was created by Ilkley tradesman E. Earnshaw, and not by Darlington.) and an illuminated address. (Note: It is not known whether Darlington created the illuminations for the address.) On seeing his bust, Collyer responded: "I am proud of my likeness. It is well done, and it will stay well done. Time will only ripen the features". The Wharfedale & Airedale Observer commented: "[Darlington] has shown conspicuous ability in this particular line, and we are told that the sculptures do her infinite credit". (Note: The bust of Andrew Carnegie was stolen from the library in 1999. The remaining bust of Rev. R. Collyer has been removed into storage.)

=== Isis (1909) ===
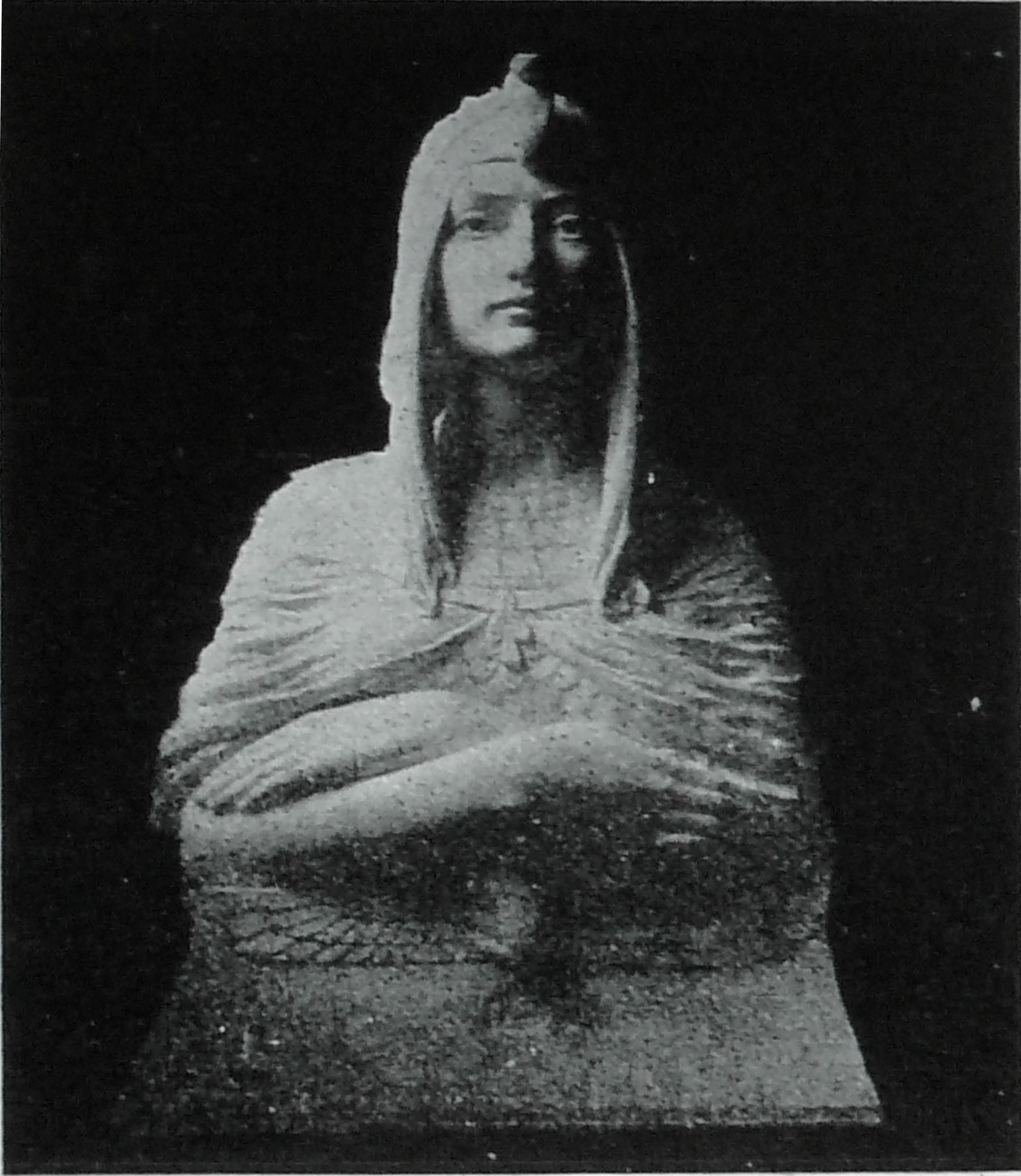
Isis, 1909

In 1909 Darlington completed and exhibited a bust of Isis. In May of that year, the bust was displayed in the lecture room of Burlington House. The Queen commented that, "Darlington ... is coming to the front as a sculptress of talent. Isis ... is a work of considerable dignity and poetic feeling, while the modelling of the face is noteworthy". The Gentlewoman described it as a "striking and imaginative work of a high order". The Yorkshire Post commented:

Executed in such materials as ivory, bronze-gilt, and enamel, Miss Frances Darlington's Isis ... ought to be very effective; it is thoroughly artistic work, but the colour, especially of the hair, is not completely satisfying.

=== Joseph Priestley (1912), Birstall ===
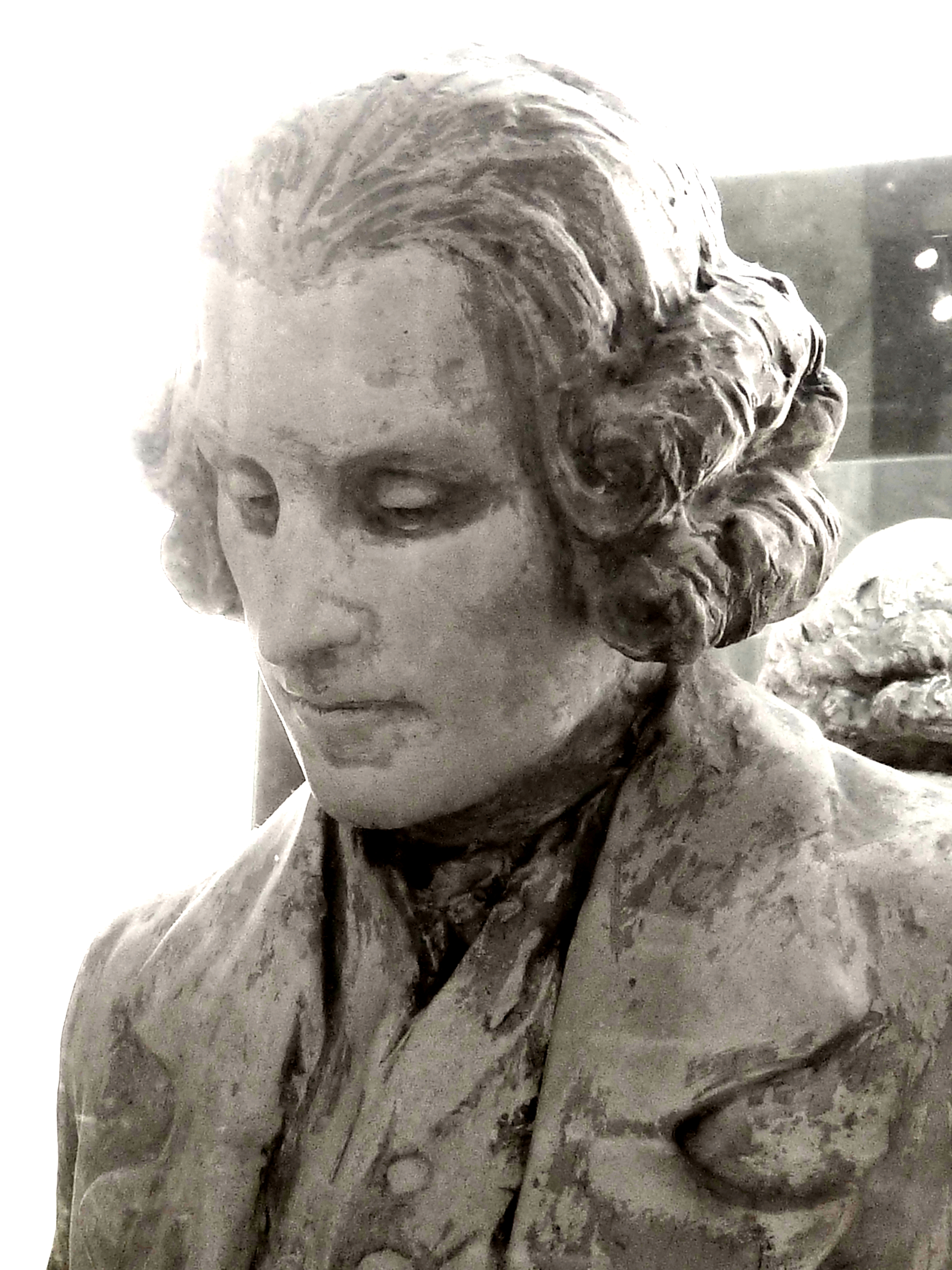
Maquette for Joseph Priestley statue, 1912 (detail)

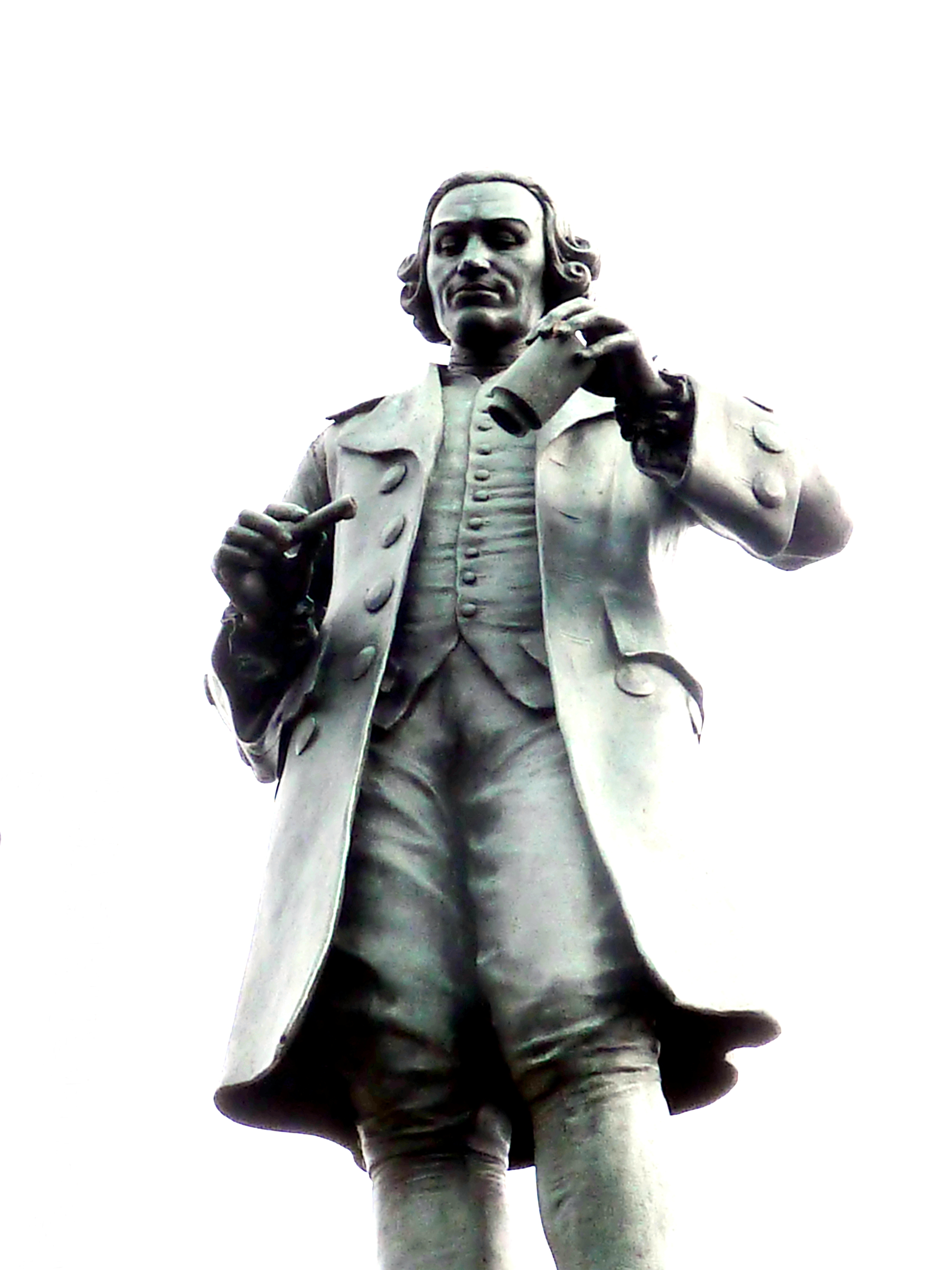
Joseph Priestley, 1912

Of all her works it was the Installation of Darlington's statue of Joseph Priestley at Birstall, on 12 October 1912, which attracted most newspaper attention in Darlington's lifetime. The idea of the bronze 7-foot-8-inch (2.34 m) "heroic size" statue was mooted by William Farvis of Birstall District Council on 3 October 1910, because Priestley was born in the town, was known there for his invention of soda water, and the town had not yet recognised him in a formal manner.

Councillor Charles Douglas promised £100 (equivalent to £10,184 in 2025) towards the cost, "on the condition that the memorial was of fitting dignity". By 1912 the cost was variously reported to be between £700 (equivalent to £69,129 in 2025), and £1,000 (equivalent to £98,756 in 2025), the money being obtained by public subscription.

The Leeds Mercury reported that, "The statue represents Priestley in the act of plunging a lighted candle into an inverted jar, the supreme moment of his life, when he made the discovery of oxygen", and that Darlington had been "widely congratulated on her work". The Dundee Evening Telegraph, which had examined the plaster maquette in April 1912, said that, "The statue shows Priestley wearing the knee breeches, buckled shoes, cravat, and wig of his day". The unveiling ceremony was a major local event, attracting a "large and distinguished company", which later adjourned to the Temperance Hall for speech-making. The 1912 plaster maquette for this bronze work, also titled Joseph Priestley, is in the collection of the Bagshaw Museum, Batley.

=== Nativity and Stations of the Cross (1913–1917) for St Wilfrid's Church, Harrogate ===
This work by Darlington of fifteen sculptural plaster reliefs of the Nativity and Stations of the Cross was commissioned in 1913 by St Wilfrid's Church, Harrogate, where she worshipped. She used "a type of coloured low relief plaster decoration" which had been developed by Frank Lynn Jenkins, together with Édouard Lantéri who had taught Darlington at the Royal College of Art. She would go on to use the same technique in other projects. The Camelot Project at the University of Rochester states that at St Wilfrid's "she was invited to interpret the Stations of The Cross in sculptural curves and glowing colour, reputedly incorporating portraits of members of the congregation". (Note: Source for date of Stations of the Cross relief at St Wilfred's Church, Harrogate: Record archive of St Wilfred's Church)

However, there is more to the history of this work of Darlington's. Today, the set of panels is called Stations of the Cross, but it was not always so. It consists of fifteen sculptural plaster reliefs of the Scenes from the Passion. In 1913, Darlington offered to execute the panels for St Wilfrid's Church, along with a statue of St Wilfrid, and a reredos. However, the artwork very nearly found itself in jeopardy. Due to a misunderstanding, in 1914 the churchwarden had to appeal belatedly to the chancellor of the Diocese of Ripon for a faculty for the above installations. The resultant Consistory Court upheld the appeal, albeit reluctantly, and Lucius Smith, Bishop of Ripon, did not oppose the request. The reason for reluctance was as follows:

Though commonly and technically designated Stations of the Cross, the vicar submitted that they were not actually Stations of the Cross, and should more rightly be described representations of Scenes from the Passion, because they represented only the ten pictures of which there were Scriptural references, and not the four legendary scenes. He gave assurances to the Bishop, and these to be repeated in the Court, that the panel would not be used as devotions. The Chancellor said the Stations of the Cross and the Way of the Cross meant standing places for devotions, and these were not to be used for devotions. He was very reluctant to grant the faculty, but the pictures could be amended so as to include the salient points in the life of Our Lord, and yet not be in any sense Stations of the Cross.

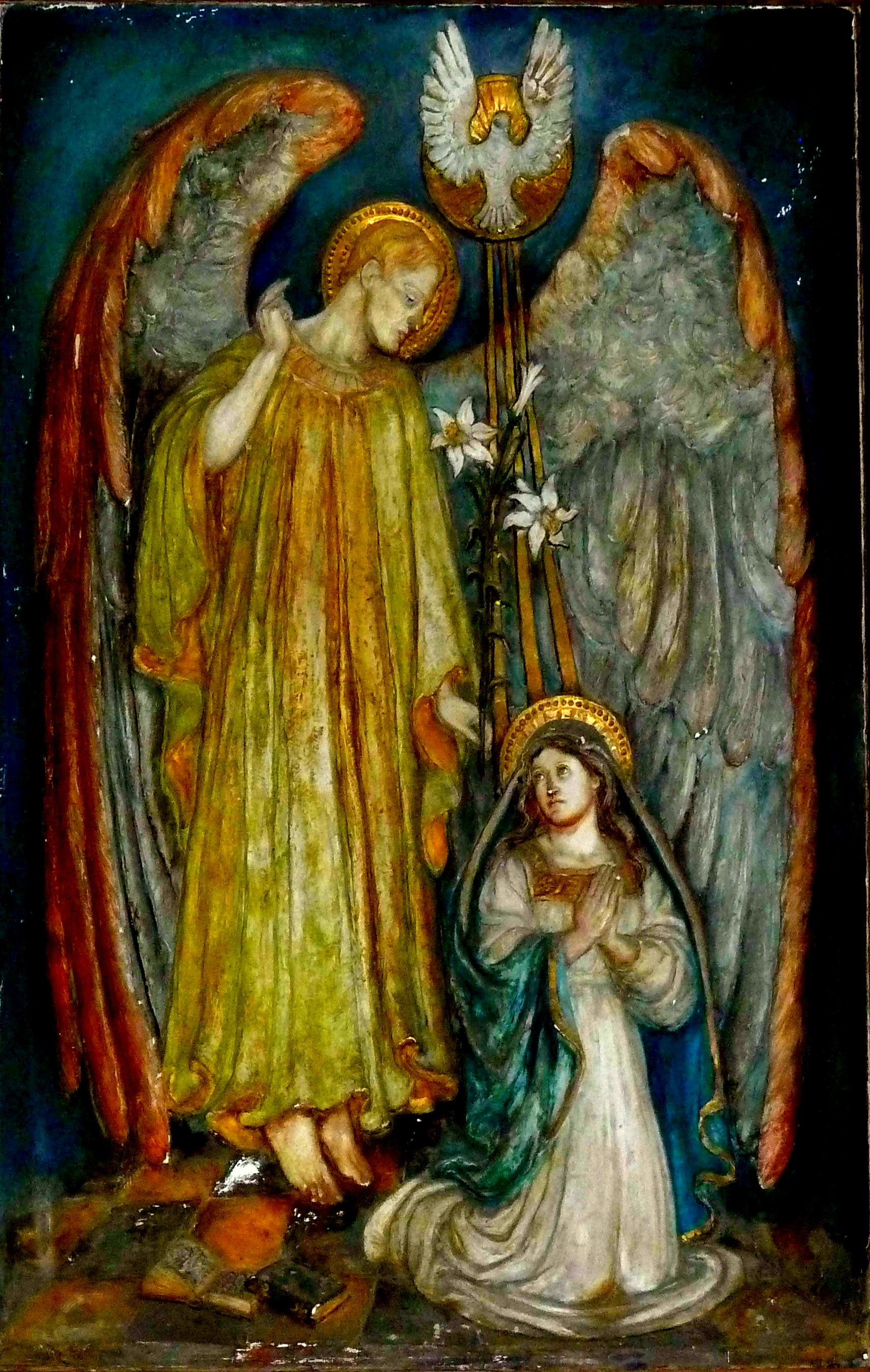
Stations of the Cross, 1917

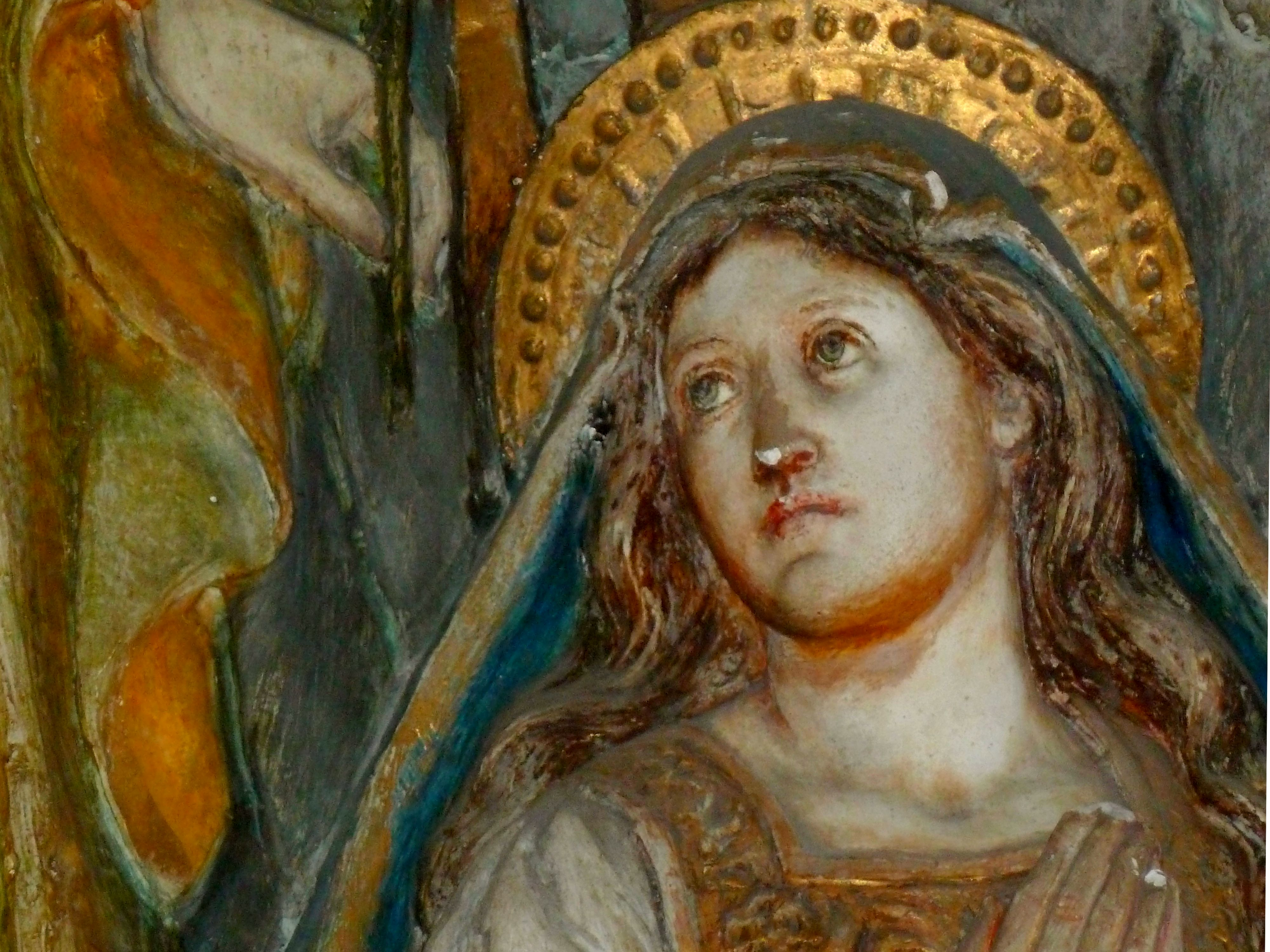
Stations of the Cross, 1917 (detail)

=== Memorial plaque (1918) for St George's House, Harrogate ===
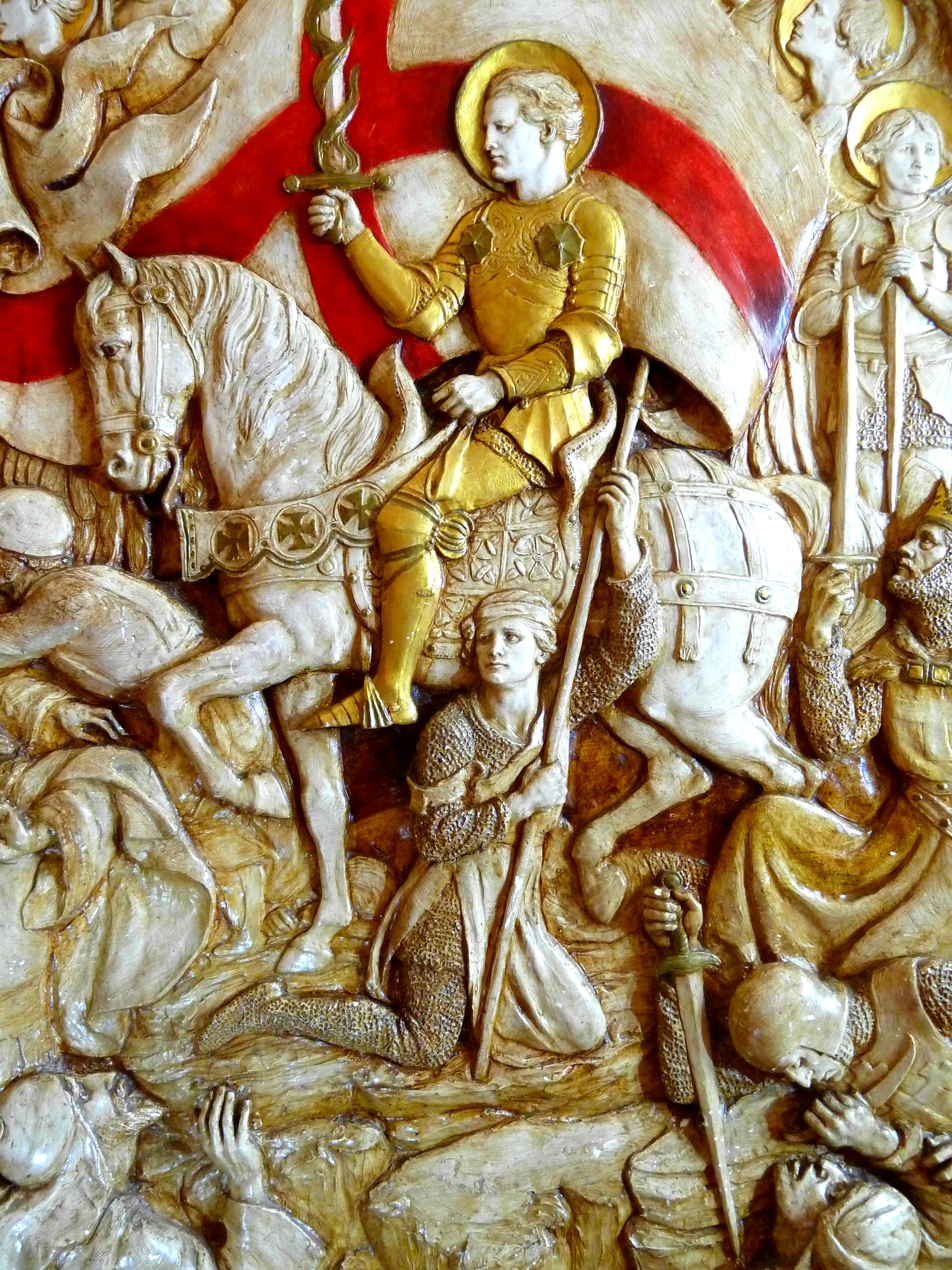
Memorial Plaque, 1918 (detail)

This is a large memorial plaque: a painted plaster relief executed by Darlington for St George's House Police Orphanage, Harrogate and completed in December 1918. As of 2024 it was in the collection of the Prison and Police Museum, Ripon. It was originally framed in dark oak, with the motto of the Crusaders, Deus vult, and a brass plate carrying the names of the fallen. The original frame has been replaced. Ripon Museums describes the work as follows:

A bas-relief sculpture with paint and gold leaf, it features St. George allied with St. Joan of Arc in an idealistic patriotism against the infidel. To contemporary eyes the piece provides some challenging material ... [due to] shifts in social, gender and aesthetic norms.

=== Decorative Scheme (1923–1924) for Harrogate Theatre ===
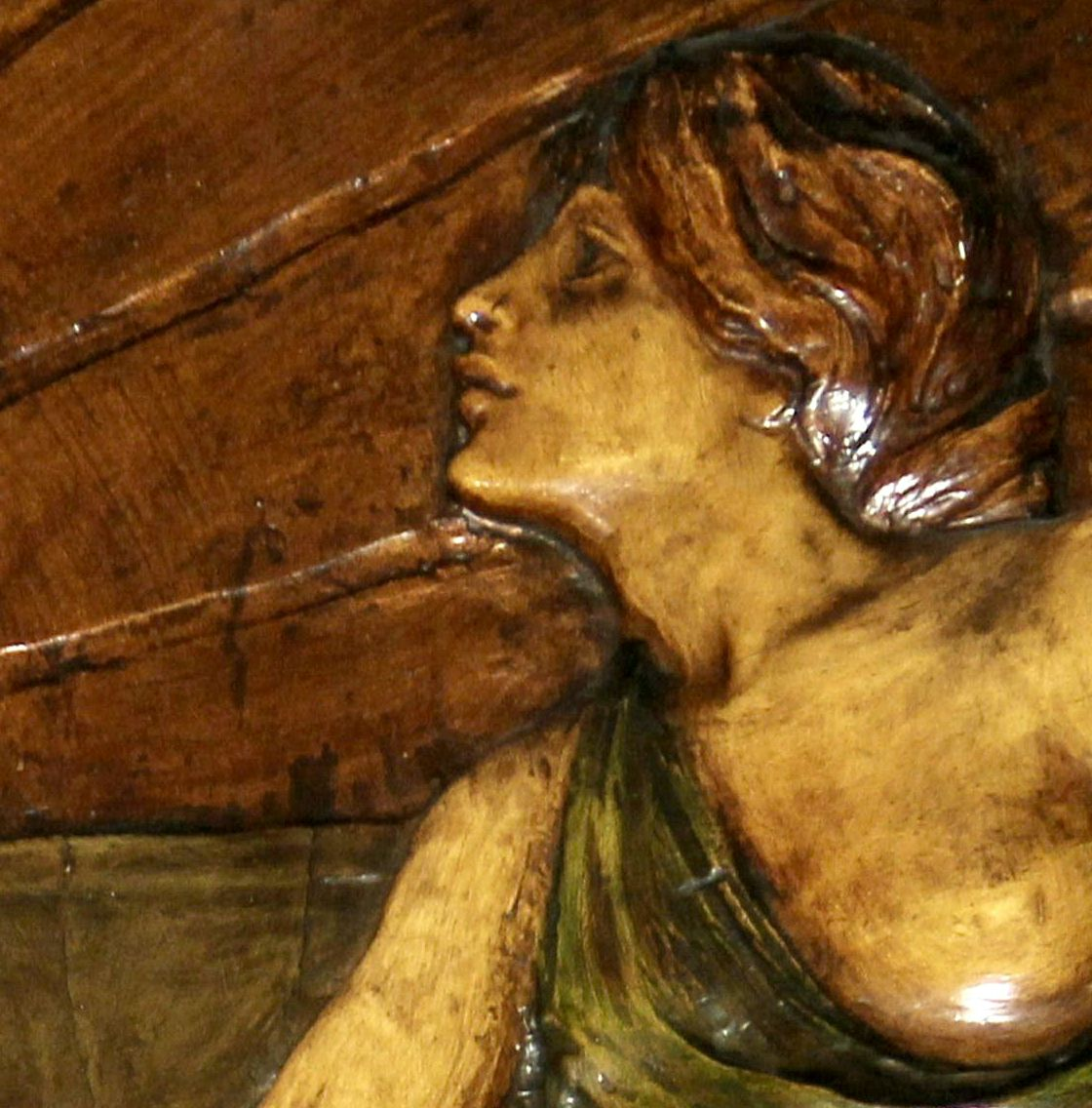
Decorative Scheme, 1924 (detail)

This work by Darlington is a frieze in the lobby of the Harrogate Theatre, Harrogate: a "seventy-foot frieze ... featuring eleven plaster panels of scenes relating to drama and poetry". It displays "the development of arts through the ages (The rehearsal of a mystery play, The Invocation of Terpsichore, etc)". Darlington's twin nieces, born in 1900, were possibly models for some of the figures in this piece. The frieze was unveiled between 1923 and 1924. Darlington is credited for this work on Harrogate's brown plaque outside the theatre.

=== Plaque commemorating the birth of Elizabeth II (1926) for the Royal Family ===
This heart-shaped plaque, featuring Elizabeth II as a baby, with her parents George VI and Queen Elizabeth The Queen Mother, was commissioned from Darlington in 1926.

=== Oxted works ===
Darlington's association with Oxted from 1914 saw her making new works for that area. In 1921 she executed the War Memorial at Westerham Parish Church, and by 1925 she had created the War Shrine in St Mary's Church, Oxted, Surrey. Undated works for the Oxted area are: The Christ Child, in Oxted, Madonna and Child in a niche above the porch of St Mary's, Oxted, works at the Church of St Mary the Virgin at Holmbury St Mary, and works at St Alban's Church, Wrotham. (Note: There is no St Alban's Church in Wrotham, Kent, so this reference may refer to St George's Church in Wrotham, Kent, which has a stained glass window from St Alban's Church in London.)

== Exhibitions ==
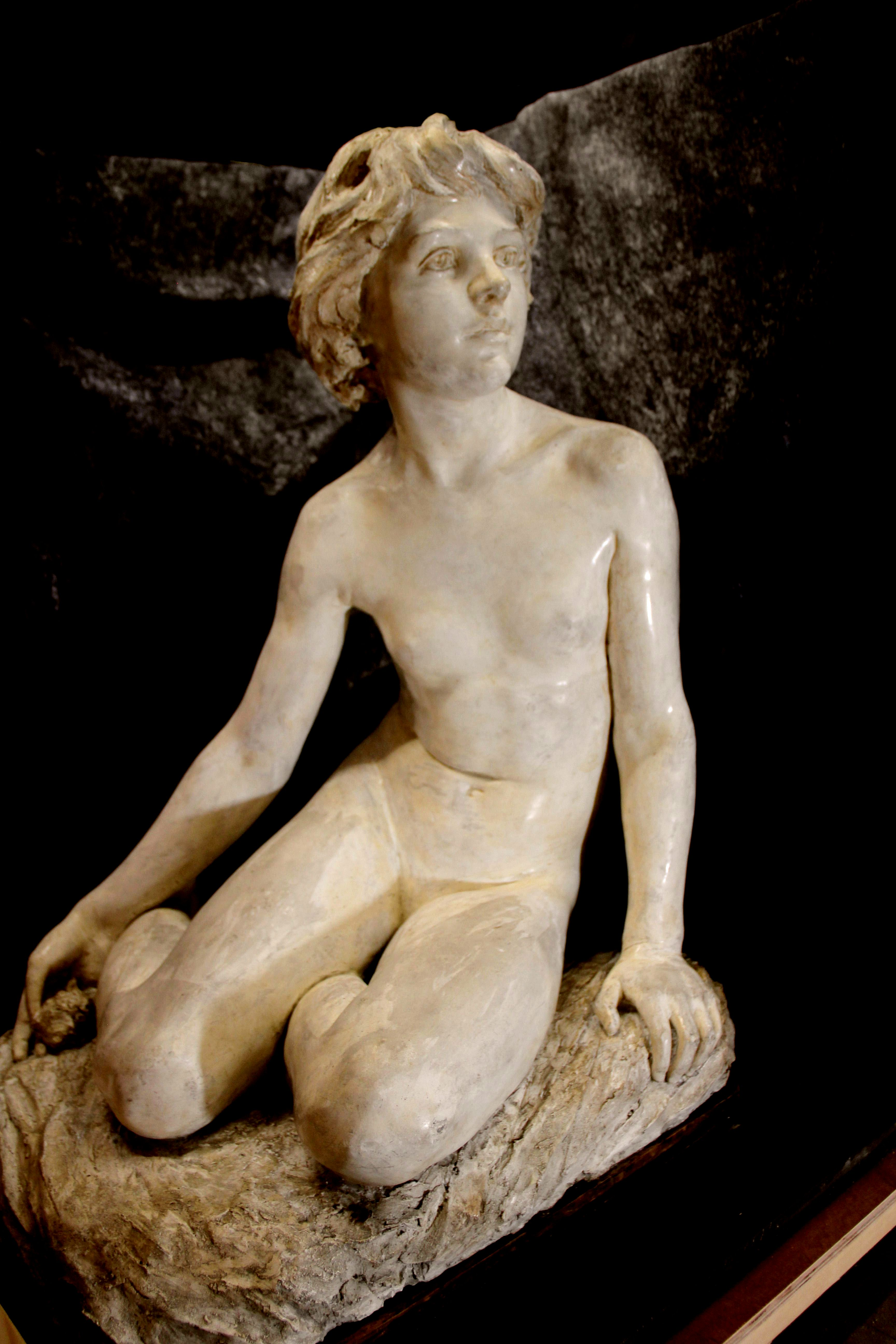
The Little Sea Maiden, 1905

- Bradford Art Gallery, Sweet Anne Page (1896) sculpture.
- Walker Art Gallery, Liverpool. Confidences (1901) copper medallion. She exhibited again, in 1903, and in 1905 when she showed The Little Sea Maiden, The Unforeseen and Lucretia Borgia.
- Royal Academy Summer Exhibition (RA). Darlington was exhibiting at the RA "when still a girl", in 1901, and continued on five occasions in total until 1909. Her 1901 exhibit was Confidences (1901), a copper medallion. In 1904 her exhibit was The Unforeseen, with The Yorkshire Post commenting that it had "individuality in its composition". The sculpture featured two children looking at a crab. In 1905 she exhibited a plaque titled Madonna della Rosa. The 1907 exhibit was Sir Perceval's Vision of the Holy Grail. In 1909 she showed a bust of Isis.
- Leeds Art Gallery: Figure of Woman (1900); Bust of Girl (1900); Confidences (1903) copper medallion; Dorothy (1903) plaster portrait bust; Hugh Darlington, Imperial Yeoman (1904) plaster portrait statuette, described as, "a well-modelled figure, firmly planted on its legs"; Magic Crystal (1904) design for electric light; Wrestlers (1904) design for relief medal; The Unforeseen (1904) plaster statuette; Love's Last Gift (1904) design for relief panel; The Little Sea Maiden (1906) plaster figure, displayed on a pedestal in the centre of the black-and-white room; Lucrezia Borgia (1906) plaster bust; Sir Percival and the Vision of the Holy Grail (1908) plaster panel; Andrew Carnegie Esq. (1908) plaster bust; Cupid and Coquette (1910) plaster statuette. She also showed her Madonna della Rosa relief in 1907. In 2001 The Little Sea Maiden was restored by Leeds Art Gallery, and in January 2002 the statue was exhibited in the library of the Henry Moore Institute next door to the gallery.
- Society of Women Artists (1900 and 1928), London. The 1900 exhibit was a medallion portrait, Miss Palmer, and the 1928 exhibit was a statuette, St Francis of Assisi.
- New Gallery, London (1904). Arsinoë (1904), bust.
- St Louis Exhibition: Confidences (1904), copper medallion.
- Lyceum Club, Piccadilly, London, La Source (1908).
- Prison and Police Museum, Ripon, Noble Bloods Exhibition (2014). Works by Louise Marchal in relation to her research on the subject of Frances Darlington, and in relation to the Large memorial plaque for St George's House Police Orphanage, Harrogate.
- Heavenly Creatures: sculpture (2003–2004), an exhibition dedicated to Darlington, at the Mercer Art Gallery, Harrogate, incorporating works loaned from Kirklees Museums, Leeds Art Gallery, and other sources. It included Darlington's hand-coloured drawings for the Harrogate Theatre Decorative Scheme or vestibule frieze, and her own photographs of her works. The centrepiece of the exhibition was The Little Sea Maiden.
- Longside Gallery, Yorkshire Sculpture Park (16 July – 16 October 2016), a "Night in the Museum" touring exhibition featuring the Arts Council Collection, and including The Little Sea Maiden.

=== Undated exhibitions ===
- Paris Salon.
- Exhibitions in the United States and New Zealand.
- Arts and Crafts Society.

== Collections ==
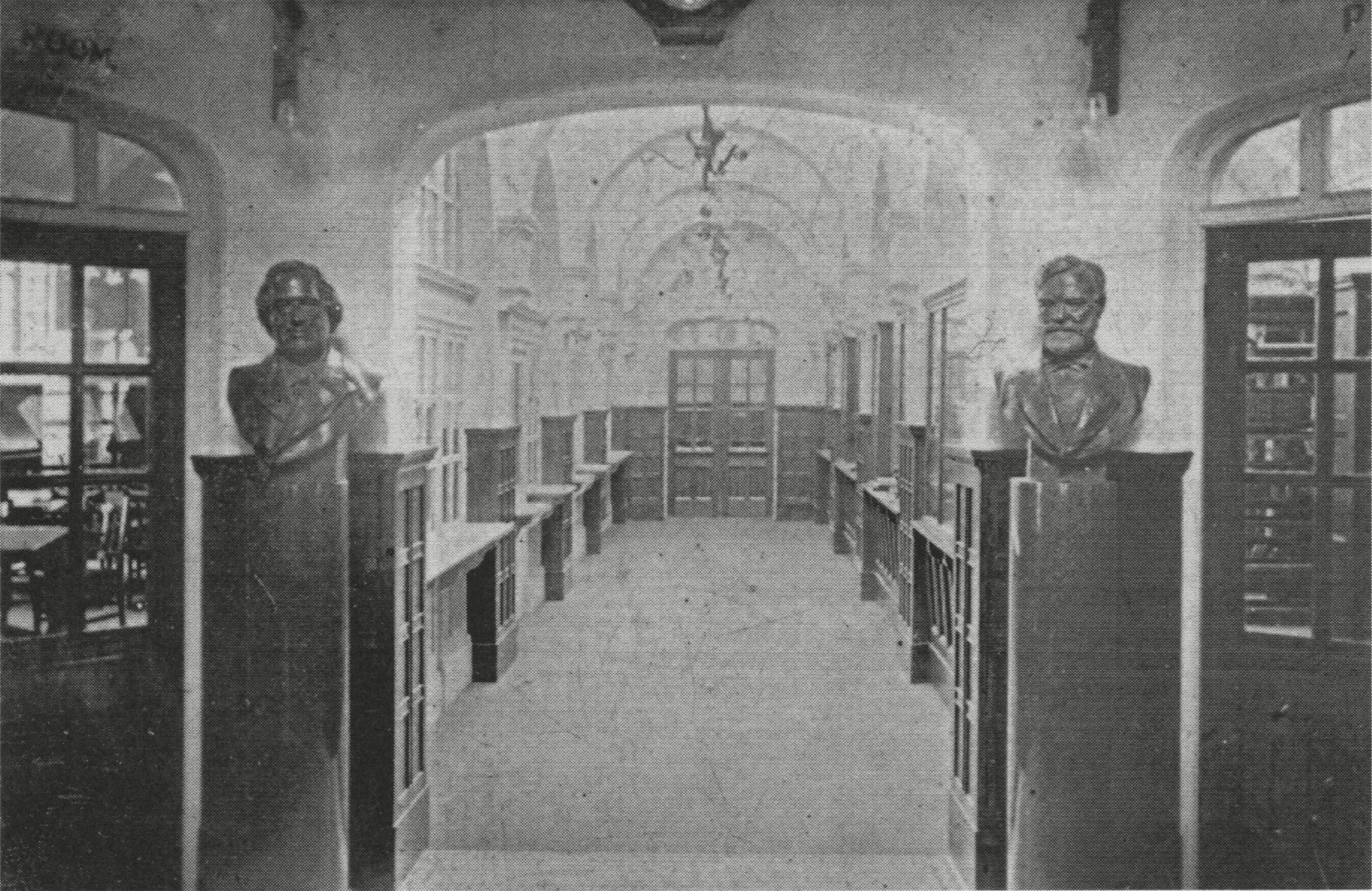
The Collyer and Carnegie busts in Ilkley Library, before 1914

- Royal Collection Trust: Plaque commemorating the birth of Elizabeth II (1926).
- Leeds Art Gallery: The Little Sea Maiden (1905), purchased by the gallery in 1906.
- Bagshaw Museum, Batley: Plaster maquette (1912) for the Birstall bronze statue of Joseph Priestley.
- Prison and Police Museum, Ripon: Memorial plaque (1918) for St George's House, Harrogate.
- Ilkley Library: Rev. Dr Collyer (1907).

== Cultural response ==
According to the Surrey Mirror, "Some of [Darlington's] plaques were made into Christmas cards". Darlington's great-great niece, the artist Louise Marchal, based some of her art on her responses to Darlington's life and works. In 2013 she published a biography of Darlington: Finding Frances: The Biography of Frances Darlington (Sculptor).
