= Catherine Gurney =

British temperance activist

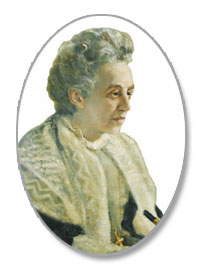
- Catherine Gurney, during World War I
- Born: 19 June 1848; Lavender Hill, Battersea, England
- Died: 11 August 1930 (aged 82)
- Known for: temperance; establishment of police convalescent homes, orphanages, schools
- Relatives: Gurney family
- Awards: OBE
- Website: Official website

Catherine Gurney OBE (19 June 1848 – 11 August 1930) was a British activist in the temperance movement, and is remembered for her work in establishing police convalescent homes, orphanages and schools, including St George's House, in Harrogate. The Gurney Fund is a registered charity founded by Gurney of which HM the Queen is a patron.

== Early years ==
Catherine Gurney was born on 19 June 1848, at Lavender Hill, Battersea, in south London. Her parents were Joseph, who worked at the firm of William Brodie Gurney, shorthand writers to Parliament, and Harriet Gurney. Their affluent and religious middle-class Quaker family was related to the Gurney banking family of Norwich. Most of her early life was spent in the south London suburb of Wandsworth.

== Career ==
Gurney challenged the social mores of that time which dictated that 'a woman's place was in the home'. The first indication of her drive and initiative came when, in the early 1870s, Gurney first began a Bible Class at Wandsworth. She then went on to form the International Christian Police Association in 1883 which resulted in a Police Institute being opened in London. Her next project in 1890 was a Police Convalescent Seaside Home at Clarendon Villas, West Brighton. In 1897, while visiting Harrogate, Gurney negotiated the purchase of St George's College building and grounds. Next to get her attention was the building of the Northern Police Convalescent Home in 1901.

Gurney served as World's Superintendent of Work among Policemen, and was the Honorary Secretary of the International Christian Police Association. The work which was started in her own home with six members, in 1893, became an International Association with branches in the United Kingdom, America, Australia, India, China, Japan and South Africa. The basis of the association was entirely nonsectarian and non-political, its object being the spiritual and temporal welfare of the police. It also aimed to establish institutes, convalescent homes and orphanages, and had a police temperance union connected with it. For twenty-one years, Gurney was a temperance worker and for many of those years, she was connected with the work among the police.

== Personal life ==
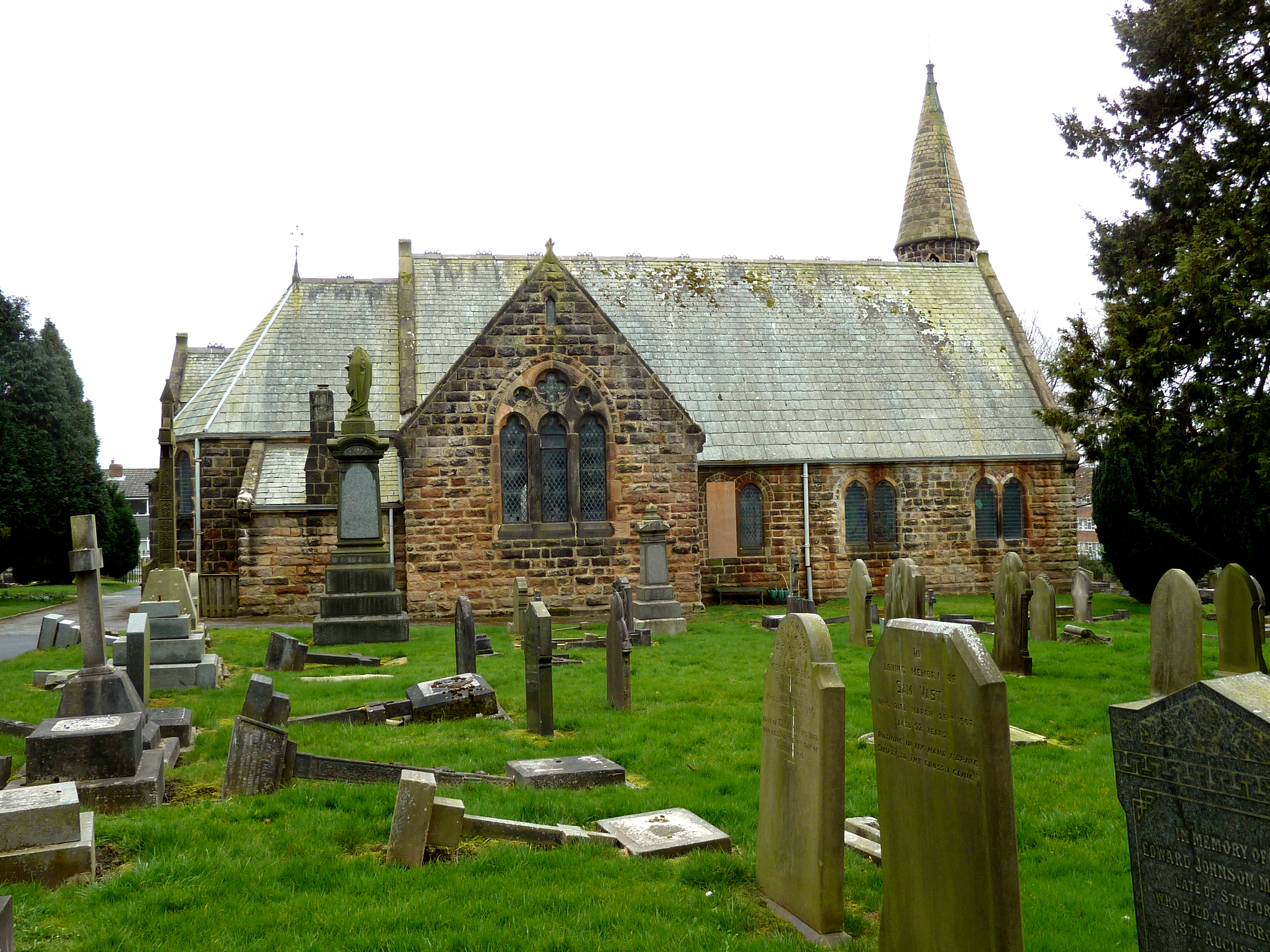
Gurney was buried at All Saints Church Cemetery, Harlow Hill

Shortly before she died, Gurney was awarded the OBE. She died at Hove on 11 August 1930, and at her request was interred on 13 August 1930 at Harlow Hill Cemetery, Harrogate, near to St George's and St Andrew's, the two homes she had originated in Harrogate.
