= Robert Collyer =

Robert Collyer may refer to:

- Robert Collyer (clergyman) (1823–1912), American Unitarian clergyman
- Robert Hanham Collyer (1814– c. 1891), British physician, phrenologist, mesmerist, lecturer, author, and inventor

== See also ==
- Robert Collier (disambiguation)
