= St Wilfrid's Church, Harrogate =

Church of England parish church in Harrogate, North Yorkshire, England

Coordinates: 53°59′43″N 01°33′11″W

St Wilfrid's Church
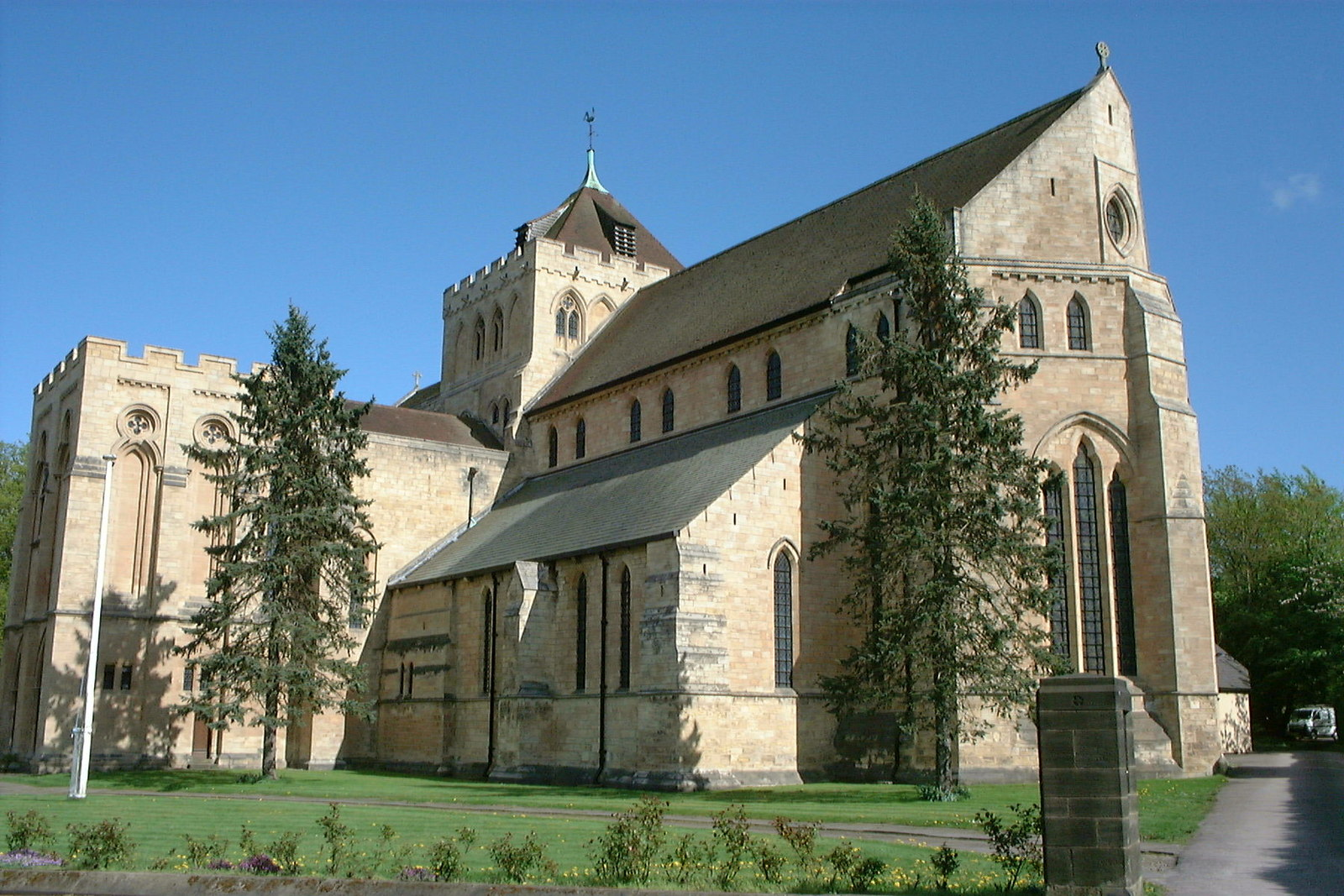
- The church in 2003

- Location within North Yorkshire
- OS grid reference: SE 29412 55554
- Denomination: Church of England
- Churchmanship: Prayer Book Catholic
- Website: www.stwilfrid.org

History
- Status: Active
- Dedication: St Wilfrid of Ripon

Architecture
- Functional status: Parish church
- Heritage designation: Grade I listed
- Designated: 4 February 1975
- Architect: Temple Moore
- Years built: 1904–1936
- Groundbreaking: 1904

Administration
- Province: Province of York
- Diocese: Diocese of Leeds
- Archdeaconry: Archdeaconry of Richmond and Craven
- Deanery: Harrogate
- Parish: St. Wilfrid, Harrogate

Clergy
- Bishop: The Rt Revd Stephen Race (AEO)
- Rector: Fr Gary Waddington SSC Fr Terry Buckingham SSC

St Wilfrid's Church, Harrogate is an Anglican parish church in the town of Harrogate, North Yorkshire, England. It is a Grade I listed building, the only such building in Harrogate. It was designed by the architect Temple Lushington Moore and is one of his best-known works. It is designated as a "Major Parish Church" and is the 38th largest parish church in England.

== History ==
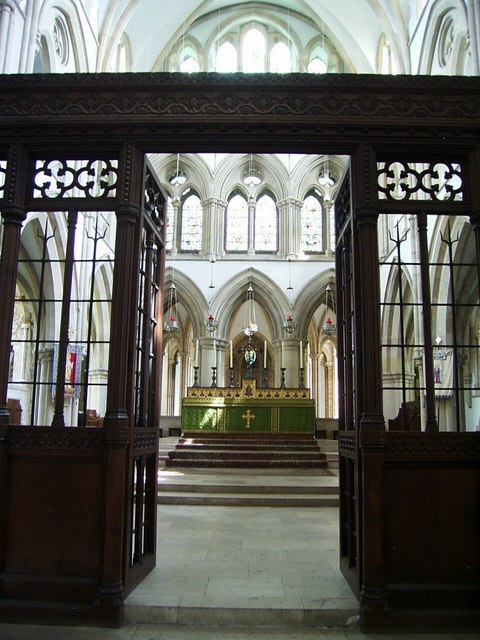
The chancel

The construction of the church started in 1904 following a bequest of £3,485 from the estate of the late Bishop of Ripon to the Ecclesiastical Commissioners. This allocation was instrumental in procuring an Order in Council on 12 August 1904 for the formation of the new district of St Wilfrid, Harrogate. The church was estimated to cost around £24,000.

The Bishop of Knaresborough dedicated the Nave and Baptistry on 4 January 1908 which had consumed £11,000.

Two sisters, Elizabeth Sophia and Jean Trotter gave large donations to fund the completion. The first gift of £10,000 (equivalent to £997,636 in 2025), allowed the nave to be completed by 1914. The church was consecrated on Thursday 11 June 1914 by the Bishop of Ripon at which point the initial estimated cost of £24,000 had already been spent. The church had to be guarded all night by a band of church workers to prevent it being the object of attention on the part of militant Suffragettes. Between 1913 and 1917 a series of fifteen painted plaster relief panels illustrating the Stations of the Cross, by the local sculptor Frances Darlington, was installed in the nave.

Temple Moore died in 1920 and a bequest from Jean Trotter in 1924 of £32,000 (equivalent to £1,682,036 in 2025), allowed the completion of the north and south transepts. The work was completed in 1927 by Temple Moore's son-in-law, Leslie Moore. In 1928, the organ was installed in the north transepts. The organ and transepts were dedicated by the Bishop of Oxford on 18 July 1928.

William Gunn left £9,000 (equivalent to £543,157 in 2025), in his will of 1932 and this allowed the church hall to be built. The hall features a lamella roof, the only example of such a construction in the United Kingdom.

In 1935, the generosity of Sir William Nicholson master builder allowed the Lady Chapel to be built by his company William Nicholson and Son of Leeds at a cost of £10,000 (equivalent to £614,900 in 2025). The Calvary was the work of Alfred Southwick. While most of the work after Temple Moore's death in 1920 had been sympathetic to his sketches, Leslie Moore's design for the Lady Chapel was radically different from the small chapel proposed by this father-in-law.

== Reception ==
The church is widely considered to be Temple Moore's greatest work. It subtly dominates the Harrogate skyline, and Pevsner considers it to be "the biggest and by far the best of Harrogate's churches, the masterwork of Temple Moore". Sir Aston Webb highlights its national importance, and goes as far as to say it is "perhaps the most beautiful of all parish churches I know" (Yorkshire Post, 8 June 1935). The church is subject of Sir John Betjeman's poem "Perp. Revival i' the North", in which its elegant grandeur and traditional liturgy are identified. Elsewhere, he remarks how the building seems vast in every direction, enhanced by what he describes as "Edwardian vistas".

Leslie Moore's faithful completion of his father-in-law's masterpiece is a great credit to him. His skill as an architect is further credited by the Church Times for 24 February 1950, which writes "Mr Leslie Moore has outdone his uncle by adding the loveliest part of the building - the Lady Chapel". In a local newspaper, reviewing the dedication of the Lady Chapel, it was described as a "glorious pageant in Christian architecture".

On 4 February 1975, St Wilfrid's Church was designated a Grade I listed building.

== Music ==
=== Musicians ===
Since the dedication of the building, there has been an uninterrupted choral tradition in the parish. A Music Foundation was established in 2015 to enhance the musical life of the parish, and improve the musical facilities available.

Former Directors of Music and organists include David Halls, now of Salisbury Cathedral, James McDonald, now of St Giles Pontefract, Leonard Sandermann and Simon Lindley. The current Director of Music is Anthony Gray, formerly of Southwell Minster and Robinson College, Cambridge.

=== Organ ===
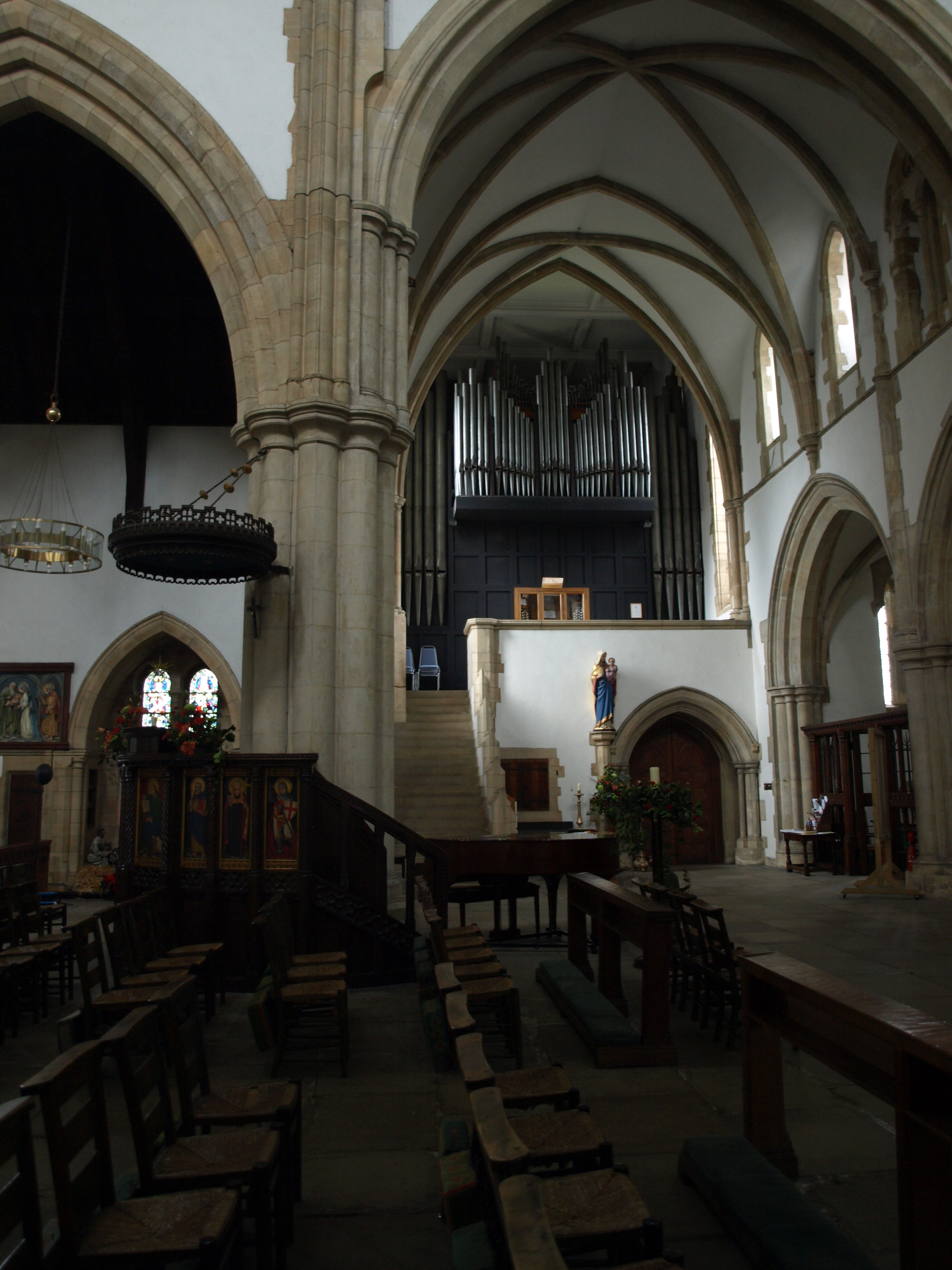
The Harrison and Harrison organ

The Harrison and Harrison organ in the north transept was installed in 1928 upon completion of this part of the church. Its outline form is based on a 1912 sketch by Temple Moore, with minor alterations by Leslie Moore and Harry Harrison. Due to a lack of funds, no case proper was realised. The instrument was voiced by Arthur Harrison, and is one of the best preserved examples of his work. As such, the organ received Grade II*-listing from the British Institute of Organ Studies.

Due to lack of funds, eight stops, three chests, and one reservoir were not installed in 1928. Generations since have displayed a continuous commitment to the completion of the organ, with additions (mostly sympathetic) in 1942, 1968, 1972, 1982, and 2011. A restoration project is currently in the consultation phase.

=== Bells ===
St Wilfrid's Church has eight bells, for change-ringing, in the central tower. The heaviest six bells, cast from redundant bells from High Hoyland, were installed in 1973. The [tenor] of the peal weighs 6 cwt and 3 lbs and is tuned to C. In 1976 two redundant bells were obtained and the ring was increased to eight in 1977.

Additionally there is a Sanctus bell in the South-East tower.

== Incumbents ==
- 1902 William Fowell Swann (became Vicar in 1914)
- 1919 Donald Mackenzie Maynard Bartlett
- 1940 Kenneth Ilderton
- 1951 Thomas Henry Henderson
- 1963 Walter Dillam
- 1973 Michael Richard John Manktelow later Bishop of Basingstoke
- 1978 Howard Garside
- 1990 Brian Robert Pearson
- 2001 Mark Sowerby, later Bishop of Horsham
- 2010 Gary Waddington

== Events ==
The funeral of David Simpson, freeman of the town, and four times mayor of Harrogate, was held here on 17 January 1931.

== See also ==
- Grade I listed buildings in North Yorkshire (district)
- Listed buildings in Harrogate (Harlow Moor Ward)
- List of new churches by Temple Moore

== Bibliography ==
- The Story of St Wilfrid's church, Harrogate. Third Edition. c. 1950s
- The Parish Church of St Wilfrid, Harrogate. c. 1990s
