= Ernest Newton =

English architect (1856–1922)

Ernest Newton RA FRIBA
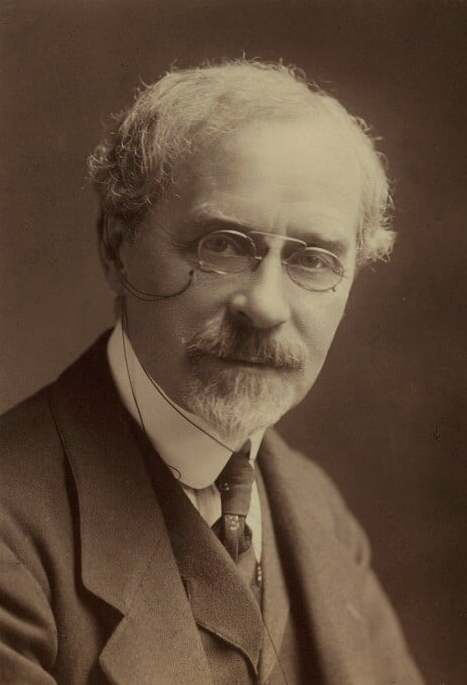
- Newton c. 1919
- Born: 12 September 1856; London
- Died: 25 January 1922 (aged 65); London
- Occupation: Architect

Ernest Newton RA FRIBA (12 September 1856 – 25 January 1922) was an English architect, President of Royal Institute of British Architects and founding member of the Art Workers' Guild.

== Life ==
Newton was the son of an estate manager of Bickley, Kent. He was educated at Uppingham School. He married, in 1881, Antoinette Johanna Hoyack, of Rotterdam, and had three sons. He was resident again at Bickley in 1883 and built his own house at Bird in Hand Lane, Bickley in 1884. In the next 20 years he built many houses in the Bickley and Chislehurst area – no two being identical.

== Career ==
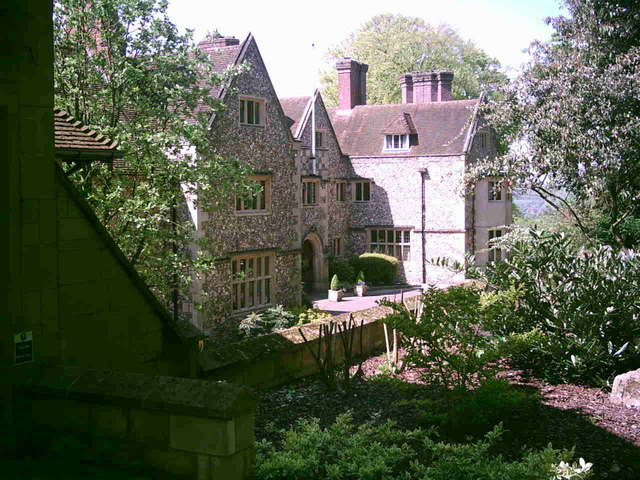
Flint House, Goring-on-Thames designed by Newton (1913)

He served his apprenticeship in the office of Richard Norman Shaw from 1873 to 1876, remaining for a further three years as an assistant before commencing private practice on his own account in London in February 1880. He was briefly in partnership with William West Neve around 1882. In 1884, he was a founder member of the Art Workers Guild. He developed a career designing one-off houses largely in Bromley and Bickley and later moving into 'high-profile' country home commissions across England.

"He is one of the busiest architects in England and therefore represents the good principles of current thinking about the house in perhaps its most accessible form..." Hermann Muthesius The English House 1904.

"His eminence as an architect of unexcelled skill in a class of work that constitutes England's chief or sole claim to supremacy – the capture and apt embodiment of the very spirit of the home..." Obituary, Architects' Journal; 1 February 1922, p187.

In the 1890s he acted as consulting architect to William Willett. Newton was President of RIBA 1914–1917. In 1918 he received the Royal Gold Medal for Architecture. In 1919, he was elected a Royal Academician, and was appointed a CBE in 1920. His last piece of work was a war memorial at his former school at Uppingham.

== Writing ==
He published Sketches for Country Residences (1882), A Book of Houses (1890 ), and A Book of Country Houses (1903).

“..a small house is in many ways more difficult to design than a large one, for while every part must be minutely schemed, nothing should be cramped or mean looking, the whole house should be conceived broadly and simply, and with an air of repose, the stamp of home." A Book of Houses

His son, William Godfrey Newton, (1885–1949), published The Work of Ernest Newton R.A. (1925).

== Works in Kent ==
His works included:

- 1881 St John's Parish Rooms, Park Road, Bromley
- 1881 Additions to house in Chislehurst (not known)
- 1882 Alterations to The Firs, Bickley Park Road
- 1882 Alterations to house in Bickley (not known)
- 1883 Sitka, South Wood Hill, Chislehurst
- 1883 Alterations to house No. 1 in Bickley (not known)
- 1883 St John's Parish Halls, Freelands Grove, Bromley
- 1883 Alterations to house No. 2 in Bickley (not known)
- 1884 Lyndhurst, 8 Bird in Hand lane, Bickley
- 1884 Stables and Cottage at Bullers Wood, Chislehurst
- 1884 House at Beckenham (not known)
- 1885 Redcourt, 5 Hawthorne Road, Bickley
- 1885 Beechcroft, 19 Bickley Road, Bickley
- 1885 House at Bickley (not known)
- 1886 Alterations to Sunnydale, Bickley Park Road
- 1886 Alterations to Nutwood, Bickley Park Road
- 1887 Parish Room at St George's Church, Bickley Park Road
- 1887 Various works at Chislehurst
- 1888 Mission Church, Widmore, Bromley
- 1888 Works at Willow Grove, Chislehurst
- 1888 Alterations to Swallowfield, Southlands Grove, Bickley
- 1888 Ashton, Mead Road, Chislehurst
- 1888 Alterations to Lingdale, Oldfield Road, Bickley
- 1889 Remodelling of Bullers Wood, Logs Hill, Chislehurst
- 1889 Elm Bank, Camden Park Road, Chislehurst
- 1889 Alterations to Campville, Bickley (not known)
- 1889 Alterations to Brodsworth, Beckenham (not known
- 1890 Alterations to Farrants, Bickley Park Road, Bickley
- 1890 Alterations to Camden Wood, Chislehurst (not known)
- 1890 Alterations to Cowrie, Bickley (not known)
- 1891 St Luke's Institute, Raglan Road, Bromley Common
- 1891 238 Southlands Road, Bickley
- 1891 Stables at Beechcroft, 17 Bickley Road, Bickley
- 1892 St Swithun's Church, Hither Green, Lewisham
- 1892 Stables and Cowsheds, Bickley Hall, Bickley Park Road
- 1893 3 Grasmere Road, Bromley
- 1893 St Barnabas Vicarage, Beckenham (not known)
- 1893 Alterations to Bickley Vicarage, Bickley Park Road
- 1893 Alterations to Amesbury House, Page Heath Lane, Bickley
- 1893 Billiard Room at Camden Wood, Chislehurst
- 1894 Alterations to Oakdell, 5 Pageheath Lane, Bickley
- 1896 Alterations to a House at West Chislehurst (not known)
- 1896 Type House for William Willett (88 Camden Park Road?)
- 1898 Martins Bank, 181 – 183 High Street, Bromley
- 1898 Shop, 179 High Street, Bromley
- 1898 The Royal Bell Hotel, High Street Bromley
- 1898 Alterations to Farrants, Bickley Park Road
- 1898 Alterations to Calderwood, St Pauls Cray Road, Chislehurst
- 1898 Electricity Works, Walters Yard, Bromley (demolished)
- 1899 Molescroft, Widmore, Bromley
- 1899 Alterations to Bromley College, London Road, Bromley
- 1899 Alterations to Hayes Grove, Prestons Road, Hayes
- 1899 House A, Bickley Park Estate, Hawthorne Rd, Bickley (demol.)
- 1899 House B, Bickley Park Estate, Hawthorne Rd, Bickley (demol.)
- 1899 House C, Bickley Park Estate, Hawthorne Rd, Bickley (demol.)
- 1890 House at Chislehurst (Derwent House, Camden Park Road?)
- 1901 Alterations to The George Inn, Hayes Street, Hayes
- 1901 Alterations to Glebe House, George Lane, Hayes (demolished)
- 1901 Alterations to Martins Bank, Summer Hill, Chislehurst
- 1901 Alterations to Elmhurst, Bickley Park Road, Bickley
- 1902 Nos 21 and 23 Page Heath Lane, Bickley
- 1902 Alterations to Bickley hall, Chislehurst Rd, Bickley (demol.)
- 1902 Billiard Room at Camden Hill, Chislehurst (not known)
- 1902 18 Edward Road, Sundridge Park, Bromley
- 1902 House D, Bickley Park Estate (35 Chislehurst Road)
- 1903 Alterations to Bromley Palace, Widmore Road, Bromley
- 1903 Alterations to Hartfield, Gates Green Road, Hayes (demol.)
- 1904 House E, Bickley Park Estate (36 Chislehurst Road)
- 1904 House F, Bickley Park Estate (38 Chislehurst Road)
- 1904 House at Chislehurst for H P Henty (not known)
- 1904 23 Garden Road, Sundridge Park, Bromley
- 1904 Spire, St Georges Church, Bickley Park Road, Bickley
- 1904 St Mary's Church Buildings, Farwig Lane, Bromley (demol)
- 1905 House G, Bickley Park Estate (not known)
- 1905 House H, Bickley Park Estate (not known)
- 1905 House I, Bickley Park Estate (not known)
- 1905 Alterations to Hawthorne, Hawthorne Road, Bickley
- 1906 Stables for House F, Bickley Park Estate (not known)
- 1909 Chancel Additions, St George's Church, Bickley (demol.)
- 1909 Alterations to Glebe House, Hayes (demol.)
- 1910 Alterations to Avonhurst, 76 Camden Park Road, Chislehurst
- 1911 Swimming Bath at Amesbury School, Page Heath Lane, Bickley
- 1920 Alterations to Bromley Palace, Widmore Road, Bromley
