= William West Neve =

British architect

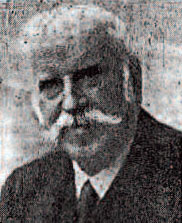
- Born: 7 June 1852; Cranbrook, Kent
- Died: 26 December 1942 (aged 90); West Court, Bray, Berkshire
- Occupation: Architect

William West Neve (7 June 1852 – 26 December 1942) was a minor English architect in the Arts and Crafts style.

== Career ==
Neve was educated at Cheltenham College, Gloucestershire and began his architectural training as an assistant in the office of Richard Norman Shaw before leaving in 1877 to practice on his own at No.4 Chilworth Street, London and later from 1878 at No.5 Bloomsbury Square, London. In 1882, Neve worked in partnership with fellow ex-Norman Shaw pupil Ernest Newton.

Neve regularly had his work published in journals and was also a regular exhibitor at the Royal Academy in London.

== Notes on built works ==
=== St Martin of Tours Church, Chelsfield ===
In 1893, Neve (with assistance from architect and churchwarden Frank Brind) proposed a design to remodel elements of St Martin of Tours Church, Chelsfield, Kent. This included the construction of a vestry and the installation of a new organ. The original drawings for this scheme are preserved in the library of Canterbury Cathedral.

=== Kingsbury Manor ===
In 1899, Neve designed a large halftimbered manor house at Roe Green Park, London for Mary, dowager Duchess of Sutherland, the wife of Sir Albert Kaye Rollit, M.P.

=== Moniaive ===
Several Arts and Crafts style buildings by Neve were commissioned by his sister Ellen Maria Monteith – the widow of Glencairn Parish Minister John Monteith – in the village of Moniaive in south-west Scotland, including St. Ninian's Chapel of Ease (1887), Glenluiart (1901) and an L-shaped row of cottages at Dunreggan (1906). Neve's drawings of Glenluiart are held at the Archive Centre, Dumfries, under the title of 'House at Craigdarroch'.

== Gallery ==
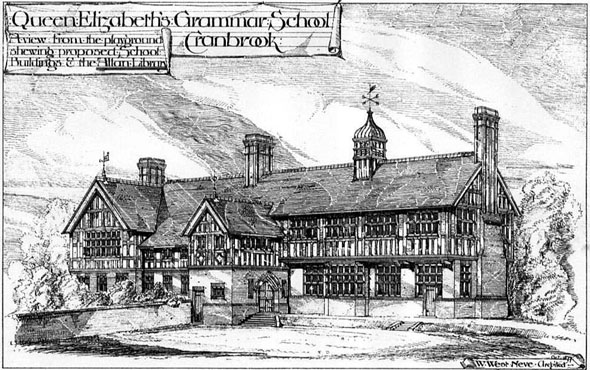
Unbuilt proposal for QE Grammar School, Cranbrook, 1878

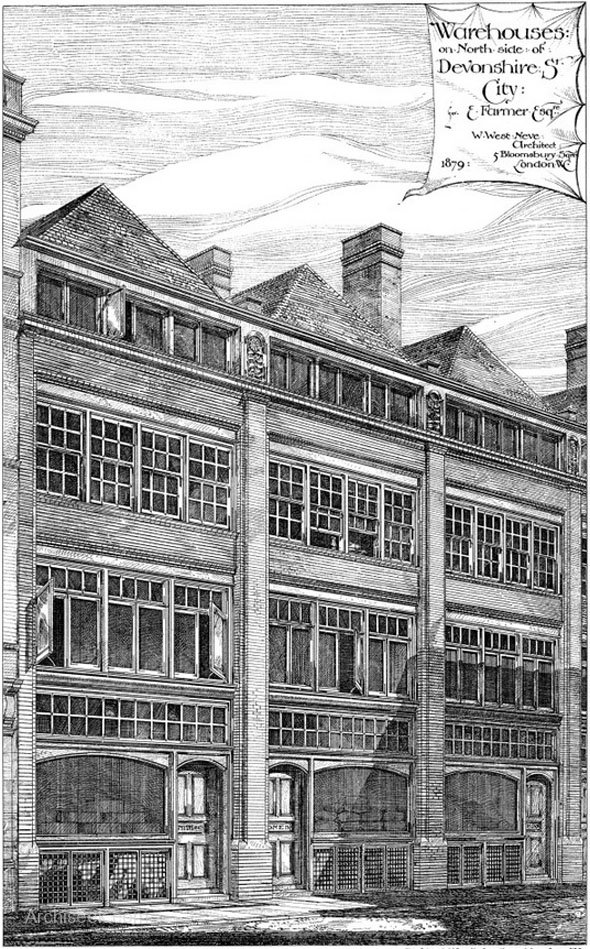
Warehouses, Devonshire Street, London, 1879

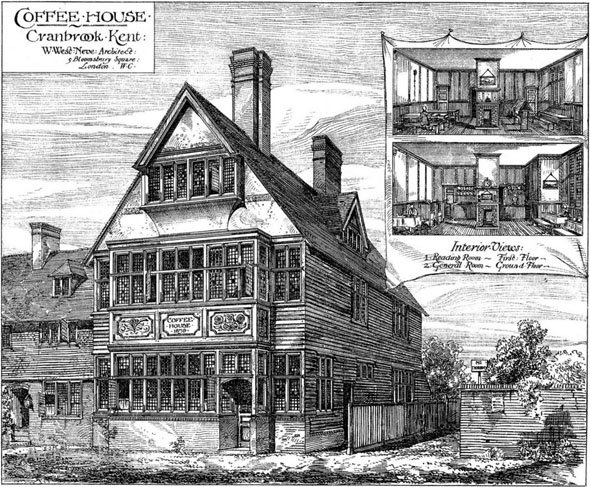
Coffee Tavern, Cranbrook, Kent, 1880

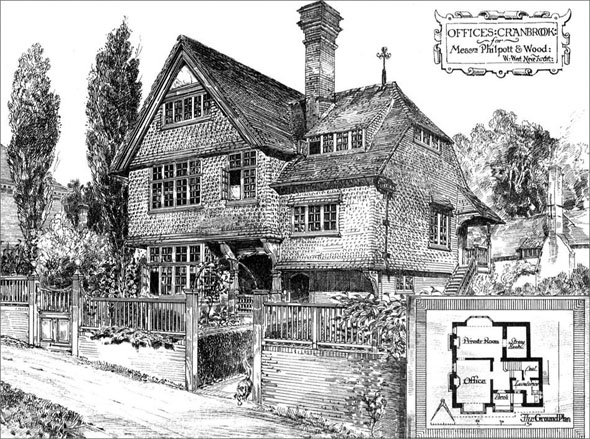
Offices for Philpott & Wood, Cranbrook, 1881

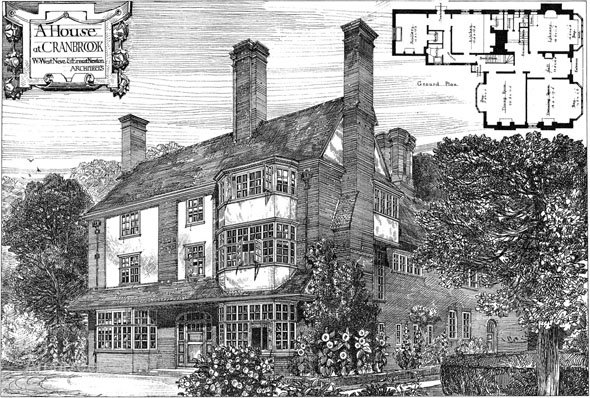
House at Cranbrook, Kent, 1882

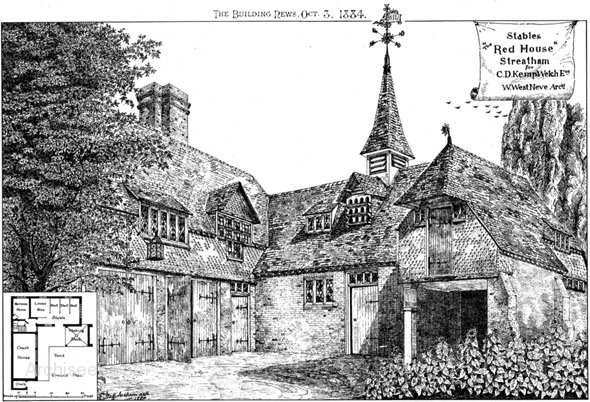
Stables for The Red House, Streatham, London, 1884

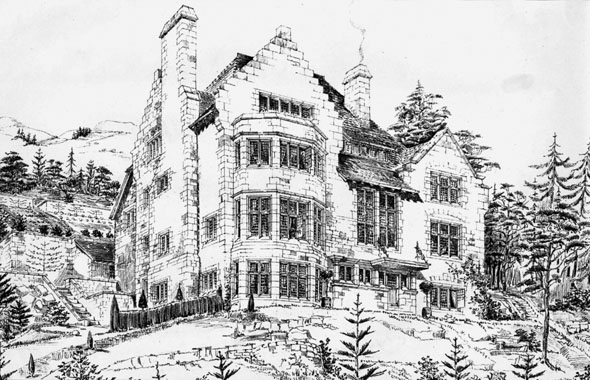
Glenluiart, Moniaive, Dumfriesshire, 1901

== Photographs ==
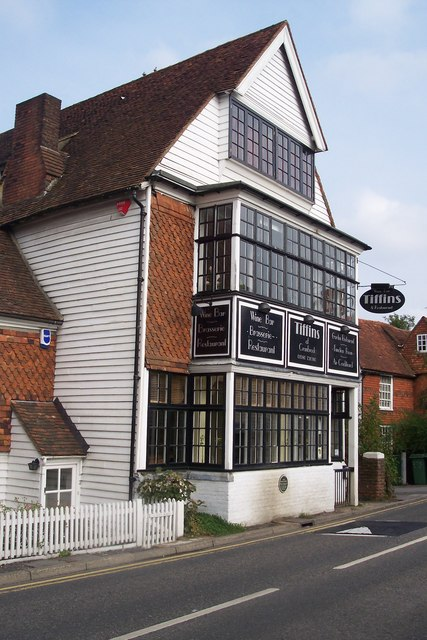
Coffee House, Cranbrook, 1880

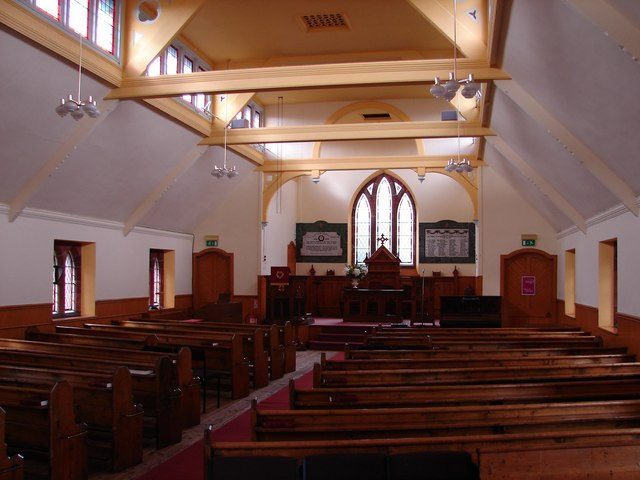
St. Ninian's Chapel of Ease, Moniaive, 1887

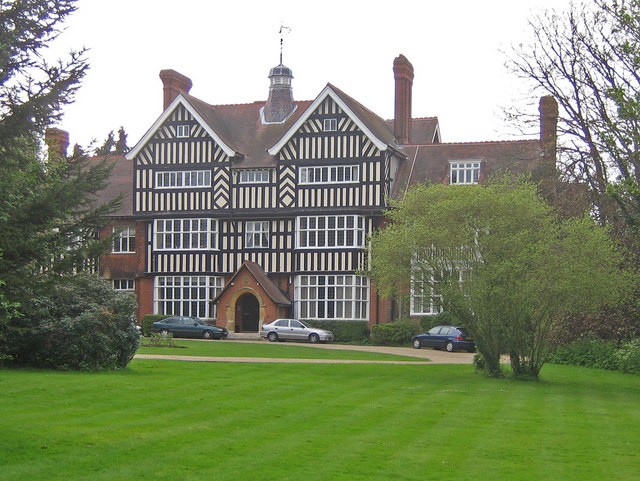
Goddington House, Orpington, c.1890

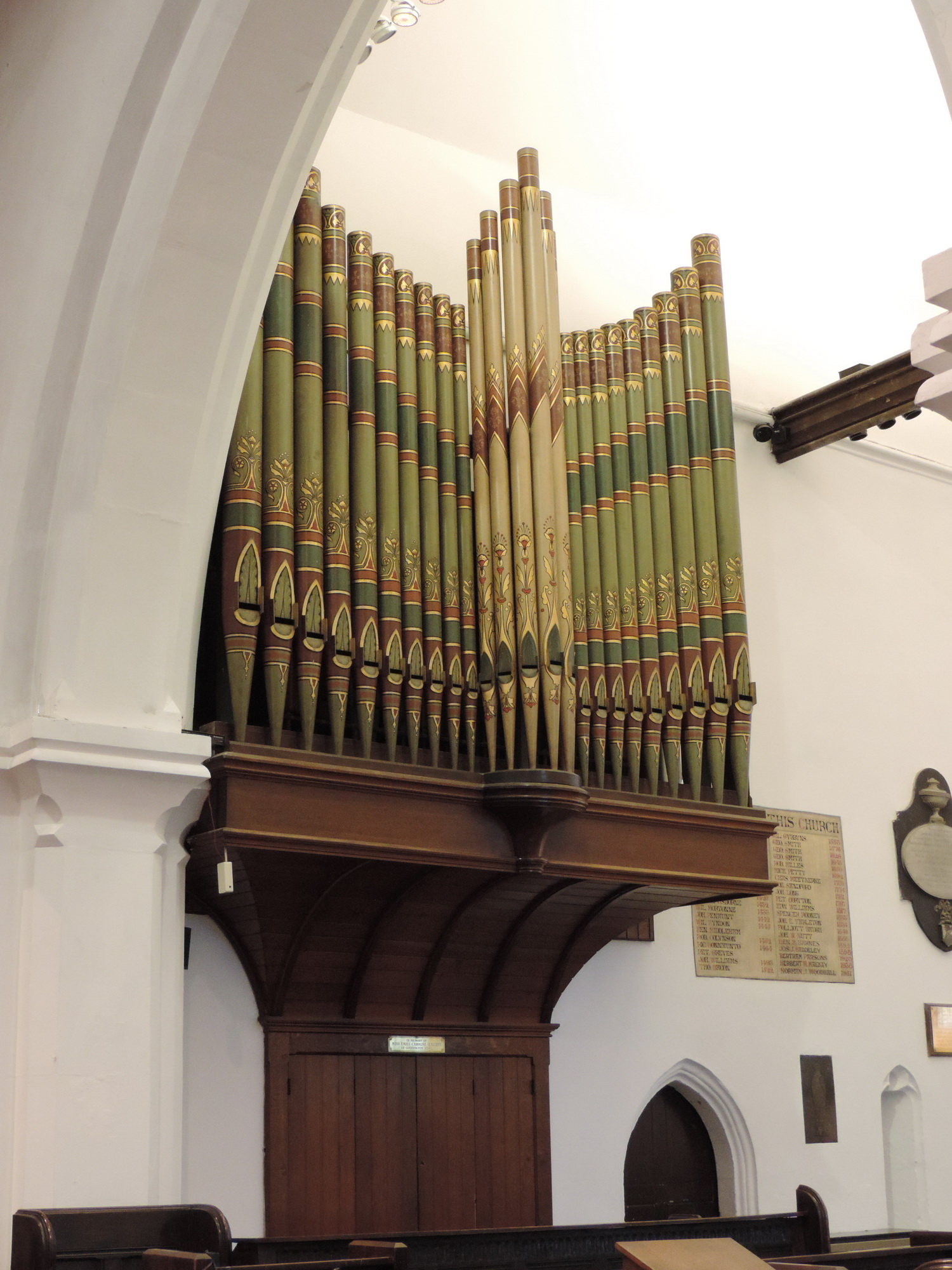
Organ, St Martin of Tours Church, Chelsfield, 1893
