= Police Rehabilitation Centre, Flint House =

British charity

Flint House Police Rehabilitation
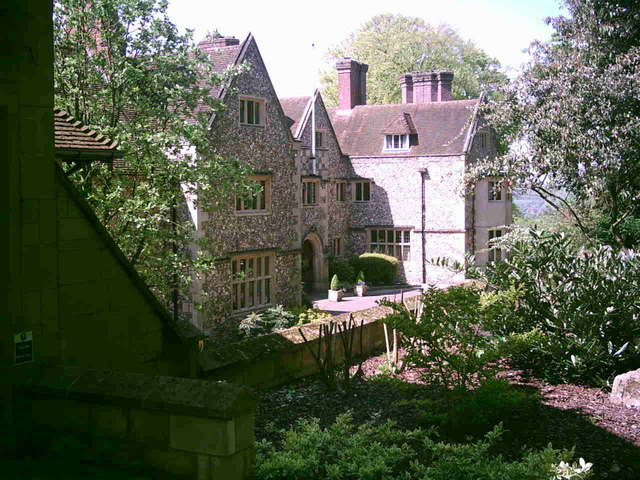
- Flint House, Goring-on-Thames, Oxfordshire
- Formation: 1890
- Founded at: Goring-on-Thames
- Type: Police Charity
- Services: Individually planned, intensive, rehabilitation services for sick and injured, serving and retired police officers
- CEO: Sophia Majaya
- CFO: Ian Lillistone
- Website: http://www.flinthouse.co.uk/
- Formerly called: Police Seaside Home, Clarendon Villas Police Convalescent Home

The Flint House Police Rehabilitation is a British charity, funded by donations from those in the police service and their families, providing physical rehabilitation and mental health support.

== History ==
The Charity originated in 1890 as the Police Convalescent Home, originally at 11 Portland Road and later at on Kingsway, both in Hove. The latter was deemed too small by 20 April 1985, on which date the Police Convalescent Home Management Committee purchased Flint House and its surrounding 14-acre estate in Goring-on-Thames as a replacement. After renovation works, Flint House was opened as a Police Rehabilitation Centre by Queen Elizabeth the Queen Mother on 2 June 1988. The house, by Ernest Newton (1913), had previously been a training centre for the Water Industry Training Board, and later Thames Water, complete with a complex system of pipes for trainees to detect leaks.

The centre has 150 bedrooms, split across two separate buildings - the original Flint House building, and the Flint Fold annexe, which was opened in 2003. By 2010, the centre had treated more than 30,000 officers, about 40% of whom had been injured on duty, with the remainder being treated for what the centre called “accumulated wear and tear”. In 2014, the centre treated over 3,800 serving or retired police officers with their staff of 149.

The centre has historically been busy - in 2010, the waiting list had increased from two weeks to six weeks, and had obtained planning permission for a further 25-bed extension which was planned to cost £5m.

In 2010, the first Chief Executive of the centre, Lyndon Filer, was awarded an MBE for his services to the police with the centre, which he helped set up, becoming the first administrator of the centre, and then, in 2000, the first Chief Executive.

== Services ==
In 2010, the centre had 14 full-time physiotherapists on site, leading various spinal mobility lessons and lower-limb strengthening classes. About 80% of attending officers receive physiotherapy treatment. 10-15% of the residents at the time suffered from stress, depression, anxiety, or PTSD. There are also other treatments, including physiotherapy, hydrotherapy, stress counselling, general nursing care, health classes and sleep relaxation. The average length of stay after initial admission is 12 days. There are 153 bedrooms in total, 71 in the annexe opened in 2004 - Flint Fold, and 83 in Flint House.

The centre has a licensed bar, which runs occasional quiz evenings, and has several lounges with small libraries to allow patients to relax. It also has 24-hour free tea and coffee. Games include pool, snooker and billiards, whereas outside there are bowls, a chipping green, boules pit, and a golf driving net, as well as a woodland outdoor fitness trail.

== Funding ==
The centre costs approximately £5m each year to run, and is funded almost entirely by regular donations from police officers. There are sometimes other sources of income; since 2009, the Home Office provided £1.6m in grants in order to improve accessibility, and to refurbish the dining room.
