= Robert Collier =

Robert Collier may refer to:

- Robert Collier, 1st Baron Monkswell (1817–1886), English judge
- Robert Collier, 2nd Baron Monkswell (1845–1909), Liberal politician
- Robert Collier, 3rd Baron Monkswell (1875–1964), British aristocrat and writer
- Robert Collier (author) (1885–1950), author of self-help and metaphysical books
- Robert J. Collier (1876–1918), publisher and aviation enthusiast

== See also ==
- Rob James-Collier (born 1976), British actor, currently in Coronation Street
- Robert Collyer (disambiguation), several people
