= Garden sculpture =

Outdoor decoration

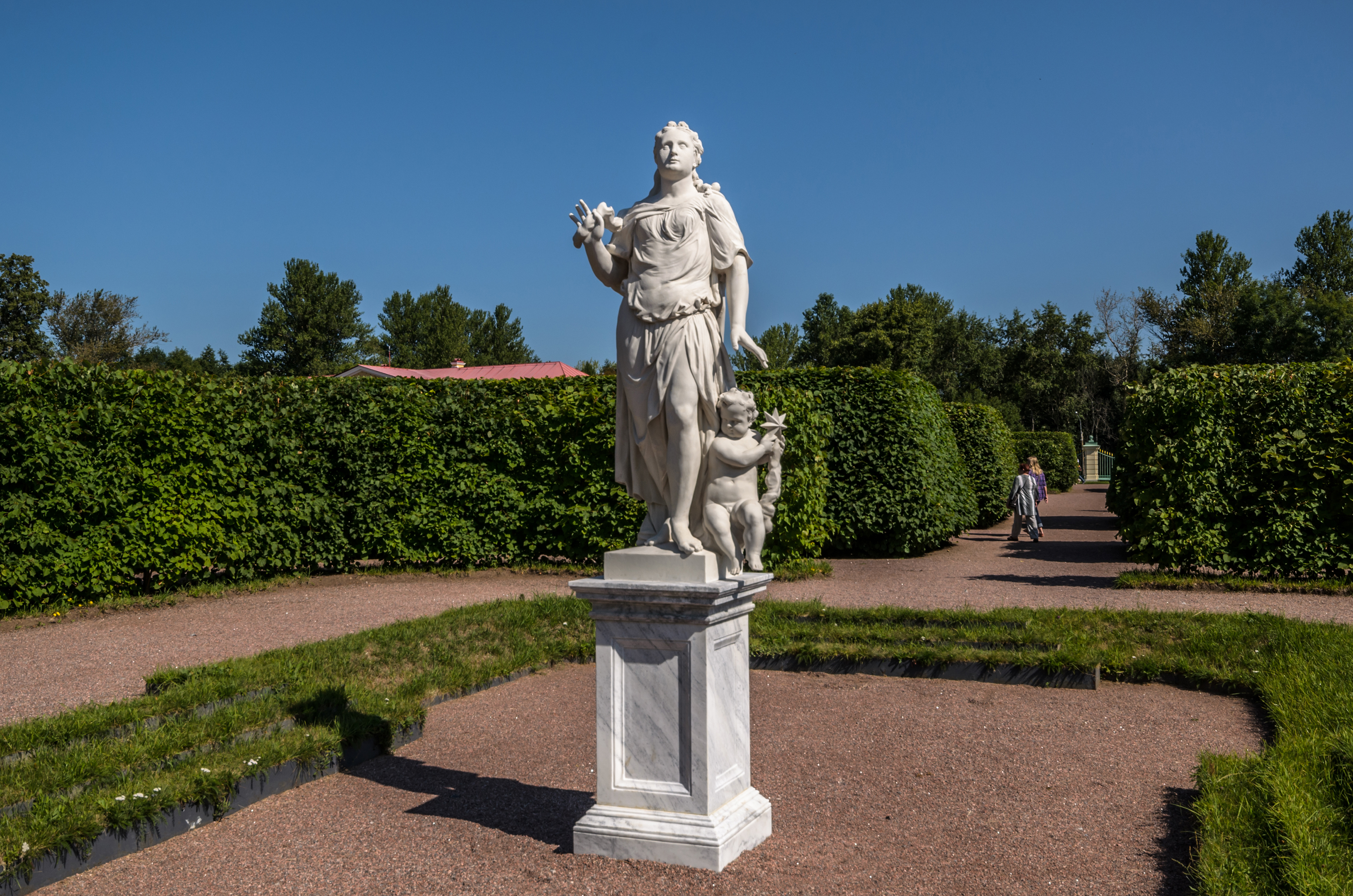
Statue in the garden of the Oranienbaum royal residence

A garden sculpture is a three-dimensional work of art that is displayed outdoors, typically in a garden or park setting. They can be made from various materials, and can vary from classical figures to contemporary abstract designs.

The predominant garden types in the ancient world were domestic gardens and sacred gardens. Sculpture of gods and kings were placed in temple compounds, along with sacred lakes and sacred groves. It is not known whether statues were placed in Greek domestic gardens but the Romans transported a great many statues to Italy and placed them in gardens for ornamental reasons. When the Roman Empire became Christian these statues were regarded as pagan and removed from sight. During the Renaissance these same statues were excavated and re-placed in gardens. Sculpture then became an aspect of art and gardens have been a favored location for displaying outdoor works of art.

== History ==
The garden sculptures have found a great history in the major civilizations of the world. Among the major themes, human figures and animals were the inspiration. However, in certain cases, for example, in China the monsters and animals were assumed to be imaginary. Thus, the goldsmiths and jewelry owners took inspiration from these garden sculptures for creativity. During the renaissance period, vivid elements were found in the sculptures and fountains. Prior to that, in the medieval ages, king monarchs used decorative flower pots and creative urns in their gardens. Likewise, some artists took inspiration from the Greek and Roman mythology. They started trading antique sculptures from Greece and Italy. For example, in the city of Rome, there are sculptures that depict the supernatural powers and gods of Rome, and they were collected by scholars such as Angelo Colocci.

== See also ==
- Garden design
