= St George's House, Harrogate =

Coordinates: 53.9824°N 1.5562°W

St George's House, originally called the Northern Police Orphanage was an orphanage and children's home located on Otley Road, Harrogate, Yorkshire, England, founded by Catherine Gurney.
