= Police Convalescent Home =

Hospital in Hove, East Sussex, England

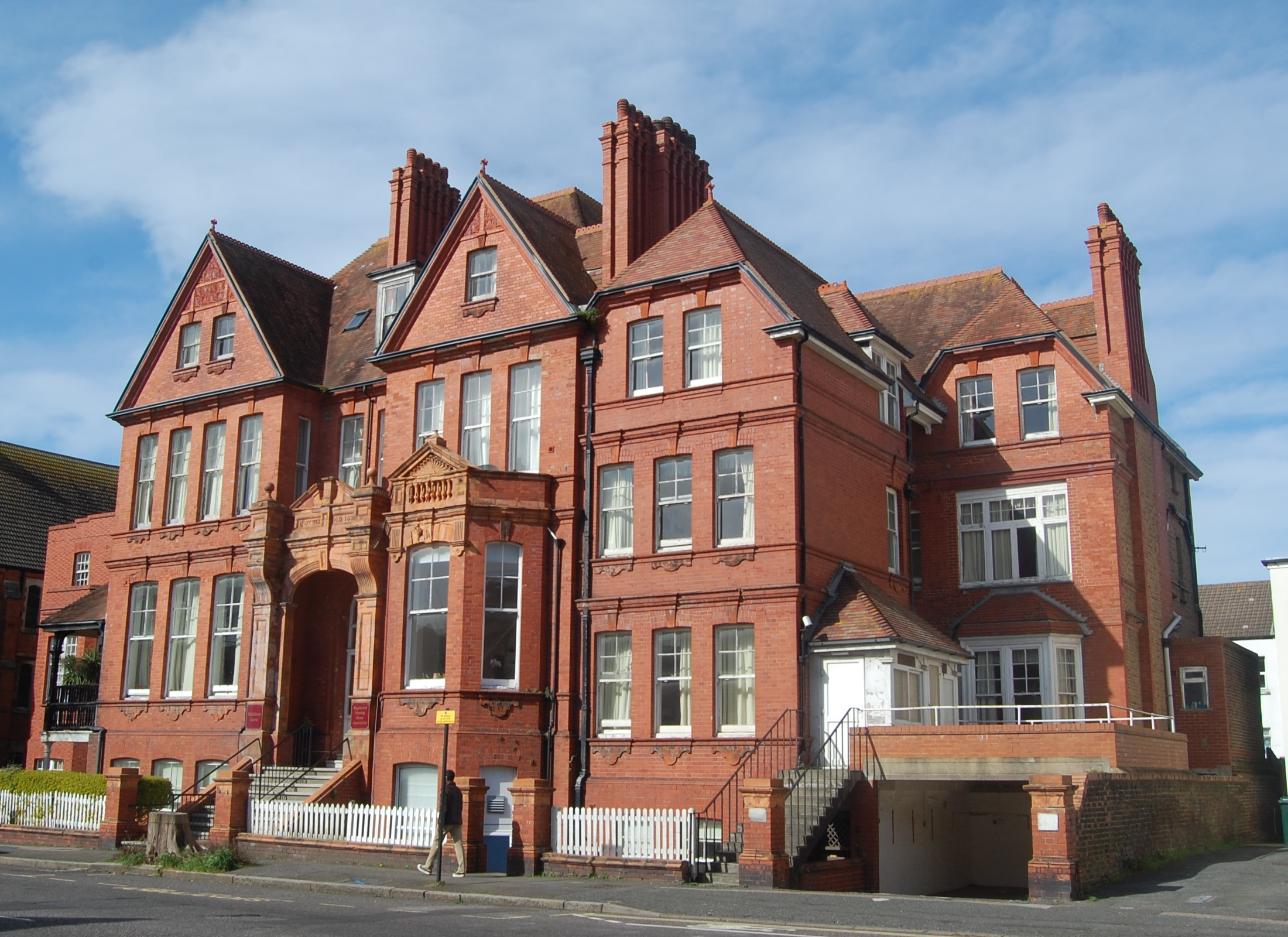
The Portland Road building.

The Police Convalescent Home or Police Convalescent Seaside Home was an institution in Hove, East Sussex housing police officers during their convalescence from illness or injury. These officers were principally from south-east English forces such as the Metropolitan Police and City of London Police and frequently suffered from lung diseases, for which sea air was held to be beneficial.

It opened in March 1890 at 51 Clarendon Villas, which for a time also housed the Southern Counties Police Orphanage A site was soon found at 11 Portland Road for a purpose-built redbrick replacement building with an infirmary and surgery. The Home was largely funded by the Metropolitan and City Police Convalescent Home Fund, some of whose records between 1902 and 1917 are held in the National Archives as MEPO 2/1723

The new building was designed by local architect John George Gibbens, with the foundation stone laid on 29 October 1892 by Princess Christian and opened by the wife of the 4th Earl of Chichester on 21 July the following year. The building was turned into an auxiliary hospital in 1895 during a flu epidemic and into an Auxiliary Military Hospital from 1914 to 1919. It then returned to its original use until 1966, when it moved to a site at 205 Kingsway, though the building at 11 Portland Road is now a privately owned nursing home. The Home was finally renamed the Police Rehabilitation Centre and moved from Kingsway, Hove to Flint House, Goring-on-Thames, Oxfordshire in 1988
