= Robert Collyer (clergyman) =

American clergy (1823–1912)

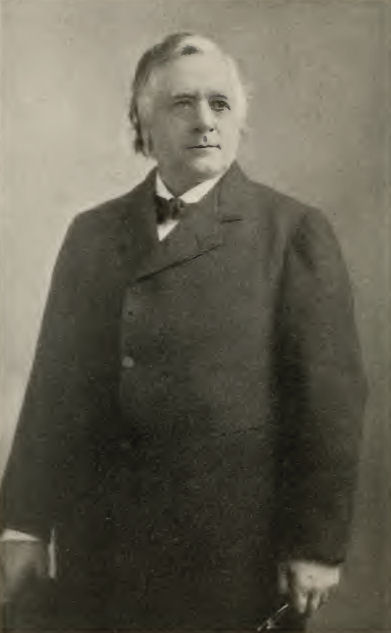
Robert Collyer in 1880

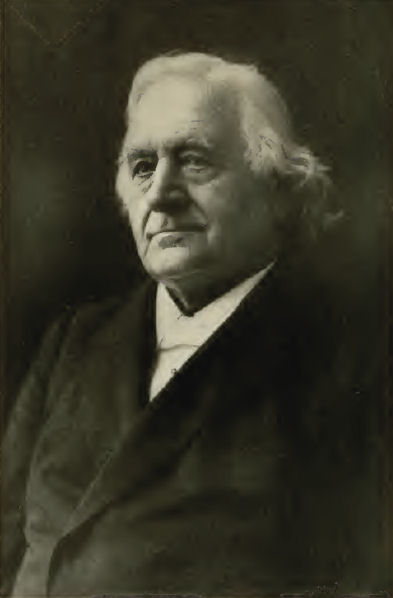
Robert Collyer in 1903

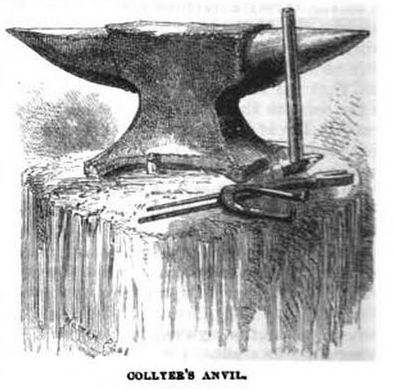
Robert Collyer Anvil (from 1860 at the pulpit of First Unitarian Church, Chicago, now at Second Unitarian Church, Chicago) - Harpers Monthly no. 284 (January, 1874), p. 830

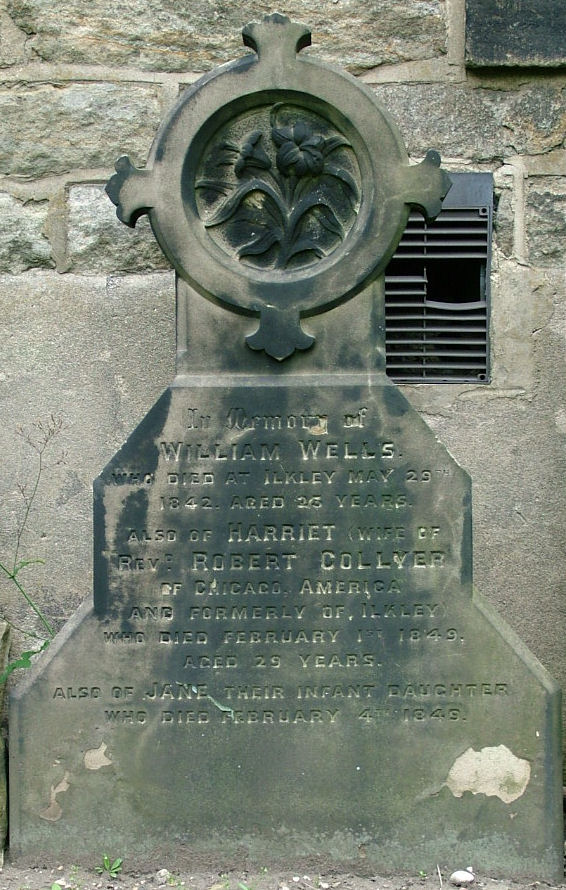
Gravestone of Collyer's wife and daughter, at Ilkley parish church

Robert Collyer (December 8, 1823 – November 30, 1912) was an American Unitarian clergyman.

== Biography ==
Collyer was born in Keighley, Yorkshire, England, on December 8, 1823; the family moved to Blubberhouses within a month of his birth. At the age of eight he was compelled to leave school and support himself by work in a linen factory. He was naturally studious, however, and supplemented his scant schooling by night study. At fourteen he was apprenticed to a blacksmith, Jacky Birch—who had taught the trade to Samuel Collyer, Robert's father, in Blubberhouses–and for several years worked at this trade at Ilkley. In 1849 he became a local Methodist minister. In the same year, his wife Harriet died on 1 February, and his infant daughter Jane on 4 February.

In the following year emigrated to the United States, where he obtained employment as a hammer maker at Shoemakersville, Pennsylvania. Here he soon began to preach on Sundays while still employed in the factory on weekdays. His earnest, rugged, simple style of oratory made him extremely popular, and at once secured for him a wide reputation. His advocacy of anti-slavery principles, then frowned upon by the Methodist authorities, aroused opposition, and eventually resulted in his trial for heresy and the revocation of his licence. He continued, however, as an independent preacher and lecturer, and in 1859, having joined the Unitarian Church, became a missionary of that church in Chicago, Illinois working as the first minister-at-large of the First Unitarian Church of Chicago. In 1860 he organized and became pastor of the Unity Church, the second Unitarian church in Chicago. Under his guidance the church grew to be one of the strongest of that denomination in the West, and Collyer himself came to be looked upon as one of the foremost pulpit orators in the country. During the American Civil War, he was active in the work of the Sanitary Commission. In 1870 he served as president of the Chicago-Colorado Colony which founded the city of Longmont, Colorado.

In 1879, he left Chicago and became pastor of the Church of the Messiah (now renamed the Community Church) in New York City. Later he brought his old friend, the popular writer and hymnodist, Minot Judson Savage, to assist him in his ministry. In 1883, when he visited Birmingham in England, he engaged Marie Bethell Beauclerc to report and edit his sermons and prayers which were published during the same year.

Collyer was invited to be a featured speaker at the 14th Annual Convention of the American Woman Suffrage Association (AWSA). There, on the evening of October 10, 1883, he spoke of his wife and his thoughts on the women's rights movement. His speech was summarized in the AWSA's Woman's Journal:

After his honeymoon, he said, he discovered that his wife had a will and a way of her own. When she insisted upon having her way he would quote to her what Paul said about the subjection of women to their husbands, and on one occasion she replied, "O bother Paul! what did he know about it?" At length his wife would so persist in having her way that he would say, "My dear, we will try the matter and see how it works," which she wanted done and he did not. The men are now thinking about the woman question, said Mr. Collyer, and by and by, in every State, and county, and town the men would say, "My dear, we will try woman suffrage," and it will be said that the greatest and best and sweetest of movements in our country was that which gave her the right of suffrage. [Applause.]

In 1903 Collyer became pastor emeritus. In 1907 a bronze portrait bust of Collyer by Frances Darlington was presented to Ilkley public library, in his former home town, when he visited England and was invited to open the library. He died in New York on November 30, 1912.

== Publications ==
He published:

- Nature and Life (1867)
- A Man in Earnest: Life of A. H. Conant (1868)
- The Life That Now Is (1871)
- The Simple Truth (1877)
- Talks to Young Men: With Asides to Young Women (1888)
- Things New and Old (1893)
- Father Taylor (1906)
- Ilkley: Ancient and Modern (with Joseph Horsfall Turner, 1885)
- How and What to Read (Texas Chautauqua Assembly)

== Notes ==
- "The Life and Letters of Robert Collyer"
