= Guy Pentreath =

English clergyman, headmaster, and travel writer

- Born: Arthur Godolphin Guy Carleton Pentreath; 30 March 1902; Hamilton, Bermuda
- Died: 30 October 1985 (aged 83); East Brabourne, Kent, England, U.K.
- Occupations: Clergyman, headmaster, travel writer
- Spouse: Margaret Lesley Cadman
- Children: two sons, one daughter
- Writing career
- Genres: Non-fiction, Travel

Arthur Godolphin Guy Carleton Pentreath (30 March 1902 – 30 October 1985) was an Anglican clergyman, and a headmaster of several schools. In his retirement, he was a chaplain and guest lecturer on many Swan Hellenic cruises. He also popularised a version of the poem 'Time's Paces': 'When I was a babe and wept and slept, time crept ...'

== Life ==
Guy Pentreath was born in Hamilton, Bermuda on 30 March 1902. He was the son of the Rev. Arthur Godolphin Pentreath, Army Chaplain's dept, and Helen Guy Carleton. The family returned to England in Pentreath's youth, and he was educated at Ashampstead Church of England School before Haileybury College. He then went up to Magdalene College, Cambridge where he graduated with a First with distinction in Classical Archaeology; he then trained for the ministry at Westcott House, Cambridge from 1925 to 1926, being Ordained deacon in 1928, and priest in 1929. As an undergraduate Pentreath wrote to his father: "I met today, at church, the girl I am going to marry. I will tell you her name when I have discovered it." On 21 December 1927, he followed through on his declaration and married Roedean and Girton College, Cambridge-educated Margaret Lesley Cadman, daughter of Edwin Cadman, a razor manufacturer of Ecclesall Bierlow, Sheffield, Yorkshire. They had two sons and a daughter in a marriage spanning fifty three years. He died at East Brabourne, Ashford, Kent on 30 October 1985.

== Career ==
- 1927 - Assistant Master at Oundle School, Northamptonshire
- 1928-29 - Chaplain of Michaelhouse Diocesan College, Natal, South Africa
- 1930-34 - Master of the King's Scholars, Westminster School, London
- 1934-43 - Headmaster of St Peter's College, Adelaide, South Australia
- 1943-52 - Headmaster of Wrekin College, Wellington, Shropshire
- 1952-59 - Headmaster of Cheltenham College, Cheltenham, Gloucestershire

== Australian broadcasts ==
In the Second World War, Pentreath was disappointed that he was "reserved" as a headmaster and therefore unable to sign up for military service. However, he felt that the war needed interpretation for Australians and he became a regular broadcaster on ABC radio. Two of these broadcasts were subsequently published by the Australian Dept. of Information:

- What Price Victory? a broadcast talk by Rev. A. G. G. C. Pentreath. Lee-Pratt Press, 1940.
- England in War Time: a broadcast address before the Rotary Club, Adelaide, on 10th July, 1940, by Guy Pentreath. Dept. of Information, Melbourne: T. Rider, Govt. Printer, 1940.

He was a member of Common Cause, a wartime think tank envisaging the shape of a post-war society. Other members included Professors K. S. Isles and G. V. Portus, Dr. A. R. Callaghan, Sidney Crawford, Charles Duguid and John W. Wainwright.

== Headmasterships ==
While headmaster of St Peter's College, Adelaide, Pentreath carried out a considerable new building programme and he developed the curriculum to include art, music and crafts to a degree unusual for the time. When he was appointed at Wrekin College, Shropshire, he inherited a near-Victorian regime. he quickly introduced his own warm and personal style of leadership, and first won over the boys and later the staff. According to Sir Peter Gadsden whom Pentreath appointed Head Boy at Wrekin in 1948: "We began to enjoy new freedoms: we were allowed out into the country on bicycles to discover for ourselves interesting places — Housman's Shropshire, The Ironbridge Gorge and the Welsh borders. A host of new activities developed — films, plays, current affairs, discussion groups, overseas trips."

Time's Paces: Pentreath quoted the verse 'When I was a babe and wept and slept, time crept ...' in his last sermon as headmaster of Wrekin. He had seen Henry Twells's version in Chester Cathedral where it is to be seen attached to a clock.

In 1952 he moved to Cheltenham College where he introduced the same ethos that had proved so successful at his earlier schools. However, he seems to have found the regime of the previous headmaster rather too "progressive". He reduced the number of hours the boys spent in unsupervised study and introduced a new rule that boys were not to go round with their hands in their pockets "but will learn to move about, not languidly searching for pennies in the dust, but with straight backs and squared shoulders, looking the world in the face." (Speech Day address to College, 1952). This was quoted with approval by the Daily Mail.

== Retirement ==
Pentreath left Cheltenham College due to the ill-health of his wife, Lesley, and was appointed Canon of Rochester Cathedral in 1959. He entered into the life of the cathedral with typical zest. When not in residence, he became a chaplain and guest lecturer on more than sixty Swan Hellenic cruises to Greece and the Eastern Mediterranean. He had a particular gift for bringing the ancient sites to life and his lectures won him many admirers. He was also Secretary of the Hellenic Travellers' Club. When he retired from cruise lecturing, he organised the Swans lecture programmes, and was much in demand as a lecturer with the National Association of Decorative and Fine Arts Societies (NADFAS). He was working on his memoirs at the time of his death.

== Publications ==
- Hellenic Traveller: a Guide to Ancient Sites of Greece. London: Faber & Faber: 1964, 1971, 1974.
- The Pictorial History of Rochester Cathedral: Cathedral Church of Christ and the Blessed Virgin Mary. Pitkin Pictorials Limited, 1962
- The Story of Rochester Cathedral; told by Francis Underhill, with revisions and additions by Guy Pentreath. 15th ed. Gloucester: British Publishing Co., 1964.
