= Time's Paces =

Poem by Henry Twells

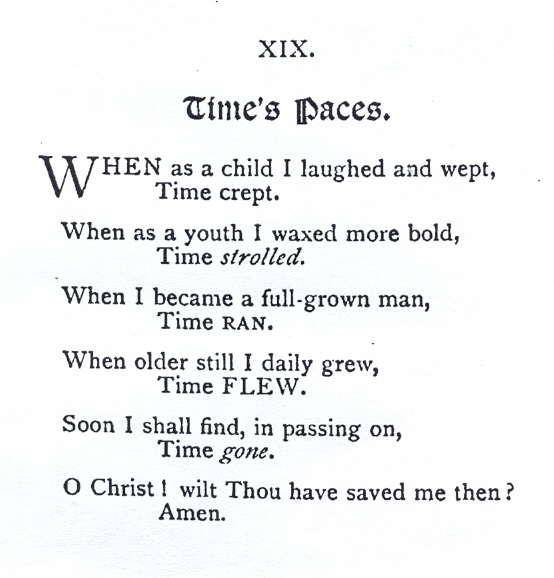
The poem, as it appears in the book Hymns and Other Stray Verses (1901)

Time's Paces is a poem about the apparent speeding up of time as one gets older. It was written by Henry Twells (1823–1900) and published in his book Hymns and Other Stray Verses (1901). The poem was popularised by Guy Pentreath (1902–1985) in an amended version. Pentreath saw the poem Time's Paces attached to a clock case in the north transept of Chester Cathedral where it is to be seen today. Recently the poem was even set to music. Pentreath quoted his version of the poem in his last sermon at Wrekin College, Shropshire where he was headmaster till 1952. His version then entered the public domain. Perhaps he wrote the poem down from memory and reconstructed it in the process. He may not have consciously intended to improve on Twells' version.

The last four lines of Pentreath's version were missed out in Gerald Whitrow's quotation in his book, The Natural Philosophy of Time and in some quotations in other books. The first sentence also begins with "For" as in "For when I was a babe . . ." This was added by Whitrow who may have received the poem orally or informally from Pentreath since he gives no reference source for the poem in his otherwise well referenced book.

The two versions are shown here:

Twells' Original Version

When as a child I laughed and wept,
Time crept.
When as a youth I waxed more bold,
Time strolled.
When I became a full grown man,
Time RAN.
When older still I daily grew,
Time FLEW.
Soon I shall find, in passing on,
Time gone.
O Christ! wilt Thou have saved me then?

Amen.
Pentreath's Amended Version

When I was a babe and wept and slept,
Time crept;
When I was a boy and laughed and talked,
Time walked.
Then when the years saw me a man,
Time ran.
But as I older grew,
Time flew.
Soon, as I journey on,
I'll find time gone.
May Christ have saved my soul, by then,

Amen.
