= Steven Chapman =

Steven, Steve or Stephen Chapman may refer to:

- Sir Stephen Chapman (British Army officer) (1776–1851), British Army officer and colonial official
- Sir Stephen Chapman (judge), British barrister and judge
- Steve Chapman (chemist) (born 1959), university vice-chancellor
- Steve Chapman (ice hockey), ice hockey executive
- Steven Chapman (cricketer) (born 1971), English cricketer
- Steven Curtis Chapman (born 1962), American musician
- Steve Chapman (columnist), Chicago Tribune columnist and editorial board member
- Steve Chapman (high jumper), British athlete and champion at the 1989 UK Athletics Championships
- Steve Chapman (Broadcaster), (born 1973), DJ and Presenter/Producer, Club BFBS

== See also ==
- Stepan Chapman (1951–2014), American writer of speculative fiction
