= Lowther College =

Former British public school

Lowther College was a public school in the United Kingdom in the late 19th and 20th centuries.

The school was originally formed as a girls' school in 1896 at Lytham St. Annes in Lancashire, by Mrs. Florence Morris (later Lindley). In 1920 the school moved to Bodelwyddan Castle, in North Wales, as tenants; the school purchased the property five years later, in 1925. Mrs Lindley continued as headmistress of the college until 1927, when the college was sold to Allied Schools.

The school is thought to have been one of the first public schools for girls to have its own swimming pool. It also had a golf course. The Lowther College Tableaux were well regarded within the community for their musical excellence.

Boys were admitted from 1977. The school closed in 1982 due to financial and other problems.

== Notable former pupils ==
- Miriam Licette (1885–1969), operatic soprano
- Sally Oppenheim-Barnes, Baroness Oppenheim-Barnes (1930-2025), Conservative politician
- Beata Brookes (born 1931), Conservative politician
- Jan Holden (1931–2005), actress
- Sylvia Law (1931–2004), town planner

== Headmistresses ==
- 1896–1927: Florence Lindley
- 1960–1961: Elizabeth Lemarchand
