= Sylvia Law (planner) =

British town planner (1931–2004)

Sylvia Law OBE (29 March 1931 – 1 April 2004) was a British town planner who was the first woman to be elected as President of the Royal Town Planning Institute.

== Life and career ==
She was born in Southport, Lancashire, the daughter of a cotton waste merchant. She grew up in Rochdale, and attended Bury Grammar School for Girls and Lowther College, Bodelwyddan Castle, North Wales, before studying geography at Girton College, Cambridge. She began work as a teacher at Benenden School before leaving to join Unilever as a researcher. However, she became increasingly interested in urban planning and architecture, particularly the work of Frank Lloyd Wright, and decided to become a planner.

In 1959 she started work as a planning researcher with Kent County Council, and studied for her planning qualification at Regent Street Polytechnic in central London. Influenced by the work of planning pioneer Patrick Geddes, she developed strong socialist beliefs. Her work in Kent highlighted the damaging effects of suburban sprawl on the countryside, and led to firmer policies of control on the development of the area. In 1964 she began working for the Greater London Council, primarily working on public open space provision and outdoor recreation issues, and remaining there until she retired in 1986. She was actively involved in the Countryside Recreation Research Advisory Group (CRRAG), which created a framework for planning for the recreational and open space needs of communities.

She was elected as a member of the Royal Town Planning Institute's Council in 1965, remaining a member until 1978. She was elected as the RTPI President for 1974, becoming the first woman ever to hold the office, in the organisation's sixtieth anniversary year. She also chaired the Institute's education committee, responsible for the institute's examination processes, and led working groups on the Community Land Bill and on the future of planning. She was appointed OBE in 1975.
