= Florence Lindley =

Florence Lindley (nee Morris) was the first headmistress of Lowther College, a private girls' school set up in 1896 in Lytham St. Annes, Lancashire. In 1920 she oversaw the college's move to Bodelwyddan Castle in Denbighshire, where she remained as headmistress until 1927, when the school was sold to Allied Schools. Lindley then moved to Kinmel Hall, a few miles away, where she converted the building into a 'rheuma spa', for the treatment of people with rheumatism.
