= Bryan Jones (cricketer) =

English cricketer

Personal information
- Full name: John Bryan Richardson Jones
- Born: 21 May 1961 (age 65); Shrewsbury, Shropshire, England
- Batting: Left-handed
- Bowling: Right-arm medium
- Relatives: Barry Jones (brother)

Domestic team information
- Years: Team
- 1981–2002: Shropshire

Career statistics
Competition	List A
Matches	20
Runs scored	502
Batting average	25.10
100s/50s	–/3
Top score	85
Balls bowled	52
Wickets	3
Bowling average	17.00
5 wickets in innings	–
10 wickets in match	–
Best bowling	3/20
Catches/stumpings	5/–
- Source: Cricinfo, 4 July 2011

John Bryan Richardson Jones (born 21 May 1961) is a former English cricketer. Jones was a left-handed batsman who bowled right-arm medium pace. He was born in Shrewsbury, Shropshire, and educated at Wrekin College.

Jones made a single appearance for England Young Cricketers against the West Indies Young Cricketers in 1980. He made his debut for Shropshire in the 1981 Minor Counties Championship against Staffordshire. Jones played Minor counties cricket for Shropshire from 1981 to 2002, which included 116 Minor Counties Championship appearances and 39 MCCA Knockout Trophy appearances. He made his List A debut against Somerset in the 1983 NatWest Trophy. He made 19 further List A appearances, the last of which came against Buckinghamshire in the 2nd round of the 2003 Cheltenham & Gloucester Trophy, which was held in 2002. In his 20 List A matches, he scored 502 runs at an average of 25.10. He made 3 half centuries, with a high score of 83 against Hampshire in the 1988 NatWest Trophy. With the ball, he took 3 wickets at an average of 17.00, with a high score of 3/20.

Jones served as club captain of Shropshire in 1998 and also played club cricket for Shrewsbury and Wroxeter.

His brother, Barry, played first-class cricket for Worcestershire.
