= K. S. Isles =

Australian economist, academic and university administrator

Keith Sydney Isles (4 August 1902 – 18 June 1977) was an Australian economist, academic and university administrator.

== Early life ==
Isles was a son of Tasmanian farmer Sydney Henry Isles and his wife Margaret Ellen Isles, née Knight. His grandfather was a convict transported to Van Diemen's Land. He and his four siblings were born in Bothwell and grew up with their parents in Spring Valley, Oatlands, Tasmania.

Isles was educated at small country schools then at Hobart State High School and the University of Tasmania under Professor D. B. Copland, later Dean of the Faculty of Commerce at the University of Melbourne. He joined the Tasmanian Education Department and taught there for a few years before accepting an appointment to teach (and coach football) at St Peter's College, Adelaide, while continuing his studies at the University of Adelaide. In 1925 he received his Bachelor of Commerce from the University of Tasmania, and in the same year won the University of Adelaide's Tinline Scholarship.

Isles subsequently attended Gonville and Caius College, Cambridge, where he studied the economics tripos under Maynard Keynes. The recipient of a Wrenbury Scholarship, he graduated with a BA in 1930 and subsequently with an MSc.

== Academic career ==
From 1929 to 1931 he was a research fellow of the Rockefeller Foundation, and admitted to the prestigious Keynes Club. His work won him the Adam Smith Prize in 1932.

In 1931 he was appointed Lecturer in Economics at the University of Edinburgh.

He was in 1937 appointed Professor of Economics at Swansea University, being highly commended by John Maynard Keynes, then at King's College, Cambridge, and by D. H. Robertson, of Trinity College, Cambridge.

He was appointed to the Chair of Economics, University of Adelaide, in November 1938. In 1942 he was seconded to the wartime Commonwealth Rationing Commission as an economic adviser, and appointed temporary lieutenant-colonel in the Australian Army to provide economic advice. He was a member with Sidney Crawford and half-a-dozen diverse people of influence in the liberal South Australian think tank "Common Cause", which discussed post-war reconstruction.

In 1945 he left Adelaide for Belfast, where he had been appointed Professor of Economics, and Dean of the Faculty of Economics at Queen's University, Belfast.

He was appointed Vice-Chancellor of the University of Tasmania in November 1956, succeeding the ineffectual Torleiv Hytten, and served from 1 July 1957 to 31 December 1967. Isles was the first full time Vice-Chancellor of the University.

Sydney Sparkes Orr, who had been appointed, on the basis of falsified documents, Professor of Philosophy, University of Tasmania, in 1952 was sacked in 1955 for allegedly having sexual relations with a female undergraduate student, a celebrated and controversial case at the time. Orr sued for wrongful dismissal, and after having lost, appealed. Orr had a great number of supporters, and a great deal was published on both sides of the argument. In an effort to clear the air, though having had no part in the sacking, Isles published a leaflet entitled Dismissal of Sydney Sparkes Orr by the University of Tasmania setting out the University's case, and was in 1961 sued by Orr for defamation, claiming £50,000 in damages as he had been unable to find employment for five years.

Isles established new faculties at the University of Tasmania, including the Faculty of Agriculture and School of Medicine, both identified as being important for the growth of the University.

== Recognition ==
Isles was awarded an honorary LL.D. in 1963 from the University of St Andrews, an honorary D.Litt. from the University of Tasmania in 1968 and an honorary LL.D. from Queen's University Belfast in 1969.

He was in 1967 conferred CMG

== Personal life ==
Isles married fellow teacher, English-born Irene Francis Clayton, on 4 September 1926 in Tasmania. They had two daughters, Janet and Gurna, who was born in Cambridge on 18 September 1928 and a son, John Isles, also born in Cambridge. He was a member of the Tasmanian Club.

He died on 18 June 1977 at Rose Bay in Hobart.

== Bibliography ==
- Isles, K. S., (1929), Wages Policy and the Price Level. his MSc thesis.
- Isles, K. S. and Williams, B. R. (1941), The Truth About Compulsory Savings
- Isles, K. S. and Cuthbert, Norman (1957) An Economic Survey of Northern Ireland
