= Sydney Chapman (economist) =

English economist and civil servant

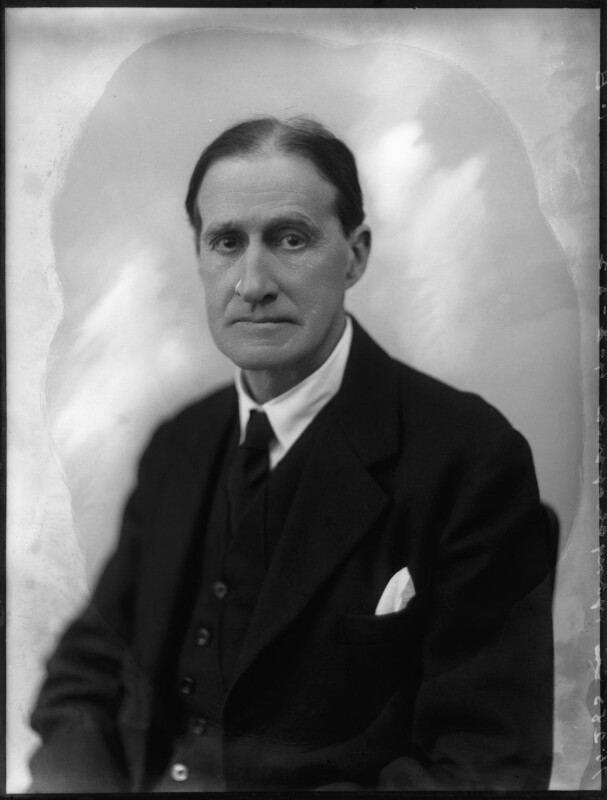
Chapman in 1932

Sir Sydney John Chapman KCB CBE (20 April 1871 – 29 August 1951) was an English economist and civil servant. He was Chief Economic Adviser to HM Government from 1927 to 1932.

== Early life and education ==
Chapman was born in Wells-next-the-Sea, Norfolk, the son of a merchant. His elder brother was the chemist David Leonard Chapman. The family moved to Manchester and Chapman was educated at Manchester Grammar School and Owens College. He graduated BA in 1891 and worked as a schoolmaster at Sheffield Royal Grammar School from 1893 to 1895 before entering Trinity College, Cambridge in 1895, graduating with a double first in moral sciences in 1898. He then returned to Owens College and wrote a dissertation on the Lancashire cotton industry which won the Adam Smith Prize in 1900.

== Academic career ==
In 1899 he was appointed Lecturer in Economics at University College, Cardiff and in 1901 he returned to Owens as Stanley Jevons Professor of Political Economy. Owens College became the Victoria University of Manchester in 1904.

His publications included The Lancashire Cotton Industry (1904), The Cotton Industry and Trade (1905), Outlines of Political Economy (1911), and the three-volume Work and Wages (1904–1914).

== Civil service career ==
In 1915, he was asked by the Board of Trade to head inquiries into wartime industrial organisation, initially on a part-time basis, but later full-time. In 1918 he joined the Civil Service and in August 1919 was appointed Joint Permanent Secretary of the Board of Trade. He was appointed Commander of the Order of the British Empire (CBE) in 1917, Companion of the Order of the Bath (CB) in 1919, and Knight Commander of the Order of the Bath (KCB) in the 1920 New Year Honours. In March 1920 he became sole Permanent Secretary and served in the post until 1927.

In 1927 he was appointed Chief Economic Adviser to HM Government and held the post until 1932, when he became a member of the Import Duties Advisory Committee. Despite his retirement shortly before the outbreak of the Second World War, he was placed on the 'Special Search List G.B' of prominent subjects to be arrested in the case of a successful Nazi invasion of Britain. During the war he served on the Central Price Regulation Committee and was Controller of Matches.

In the early 1940s he suffered a stroke and in 1951 he died suddenly at his home in Ware, Hertfordshire of a massive heart attack.

== Theory on working time ==
In 1909, Chapman presented his theory on working time, fatigue and productivity at the conference of the Section on Economic Science and Statistics of the British Association for the Advancement of Science. The theory was subsequently published as "Hours of Labour" in the September 1909 issue of the Economic Journal. Chapman's analysis came to be regarded as the "classical statement of the theory of 'hours' in a free market" (John Hicks). Arthur C. Pigou restated Chapman's argument in his influential textbook, Economics of Welfare. Alfred Marshall referred to Chapman's analysis as authoritative, as did Lionel Robbins. Concluding a reference to Chapman and Pigou on the hours of labour, Hicks declared, "There is very little that needs to be added to the conclusions of these authorities."

The fact that both the intensity and the duration of work vary makes it hard for economists to calculate the returns to various factors of production. So, in the 1930s, Hicks introduced a simplifying assumption that the given hours of work are optimal. He cautioned that after performing the calculations, it would be necessary for the analyst to "think back" from the simplification to more realistic assumptions. Instead, however, economists have come to regard the simplification as an adequate description of reality, although it is counter to what the actual theory suggests is the case.

== Recent reference to Chapman's theory ==
In 2001, the government of the Australian state of Queensland highlighted Chapman's theory of the hours of labour in their submission to the Australian Industrial Relations Commission on the "Reasonable Hours" test case. They presented the following summary of Chapman's argument:

The main points of this argument can be summarised as follows:

- a mass of evidence indicating that reductions in hours of work had not led to proportionate declines in output;
- modern industry fatigue was less physical in nature and more a combination of psychological and physiological as a result of specialisation and increased need for mental concentration;
- the reduction of hours allowed better-rested workers to produce as much or more in the shorter hours;
- the total value of the output would initially rise as the working day increased but eventually the total output as well as the output per hour would decline as the working day became so long that it prevented adequate recovery from fatigue for workers;
- this is the case because, beyond a certain point, each additional hour of work would be contributing to the output of the current day's total output but at the expense of the following day's output capacity; and
- the intensity of the work involved would dictate the point at which total output begins to fall and thus the length of the 'optimal' working day.

The second half of this argument explores whether the free market can arrive at the 'optimal' length of day, and can be summarised as follows:

- the maintenance of a long-term optimum by employers would require short-term restraint;
- each individual employer could never be certain of reaping the benefit of their restraint as another firm could potentially entice the employer's well-rested workers away with a wage premium;
- therefore the optimal output work time is a form of investment without equity;
- simultaneously, Chapman (1909) assumed that workers would choose a longer working day than was prudent (although not as long as the working day preferred by employers), primarily because of a general short-sightedness that would mean workers would consider their immediate earning capacity more than their longterm earning capacity; and
- the outcome in a free market situation would therefore be one where employers and employees acting in self-interest would each tend to select a working day that was longer than the 'optimal' hours.

Chapman (1909) considered three elements in gauging the optimal day for the worker;

1. the wage,
2. the marginal value of leisure and
3. the disutility of work.

== Family ==
His second son was the judge Sir Stephen Chapman.

Professional and academic associations
Preceded by James Niven	President of the Manchester Statistical Society; 1909–11	Succeeded by Sir Drummond Fraser
