= Barry Jones (cricketer) =

English cricketer

Personal information
- Full name: Barry John Richardson Jones
- Born: 2 November 1955 (age 71); Shrewsbury, England
- Batting: Left-handed
- Bowling: Right-arm medium

Domestic team information
- Years: Team
- 1976–1980: Worcestershire

Career statistics
Competition	FC	LA
Matches	46	17
Runs scored	1,076	177
Batting average	13.79	17.70
100s/50s	0/2	0/0
Top score	65	44*
Balls bowled	0	0
Wickets	0	0
Bowling average	-	-
5 wickets in innings	0	0
10 wickets in match	0	N/A
Best bowling	-	-
Catches/stumpings	19/0	3/0
- Source: CricketArchive, 19 November 2008

Barry John Richardson Jones (born 2 November 1955) is a former English cricketer who played first-class and List A cricket for Worcestershire between 1976 and 1980.

Jones was born in Shrewsbury, Shropshire and educated at Wrekin College.

Jones made his first-class debut against Oxford University at The University Parks in late May 1976. Although he made only 10 and 4 from number two in the order, he was retained for the County Championship match which immediately followed. In this game, now batting at seven, he did no better, making only 11 and 1. After this, Jones spent a long period out of the first team, returning only in August when he was given a short run but again made no significant scores.

During the 1977 season, Jones played in the First XI more than at any other time, turning out for 14 first-class and six List A games. In late August he finally made his maiden fifty, hitting 65 against Warwickshire at Edgbaston. Wisden thought he had made "a steady advance" over the summer, but statistically his season as a whole was disappointing as he averaged only 16.31 in first-class cricket and 8.80 in the one-day game.

From 1978 to 1980, Jones was in and out of the Worcestershire side, often getting chances but never managing a really big score. Indeed, he was to score only one half-century in 26 first-class games during that period, an innings of 61 against Oxford University in June 1978. His most eye-catching achievement came in a Second XI match, when he hit a century in each innings versus Somerset II in August 1979.

Jones' career in top-class cricket ended after the 1980 season, and he returned to his family's farm in Shropshire. He played minor counties cricket with Shropshire in 1981 and 1982, and since 2006 he has made numerous appearances for Shropshire's Over-50s team. He has played at club level for Wroxeter.

His brother Bryan Jones made 20 List A appearances for Shropshire and played one Youth Test for England.
