= Albert James Hannan =

Australian lawyer

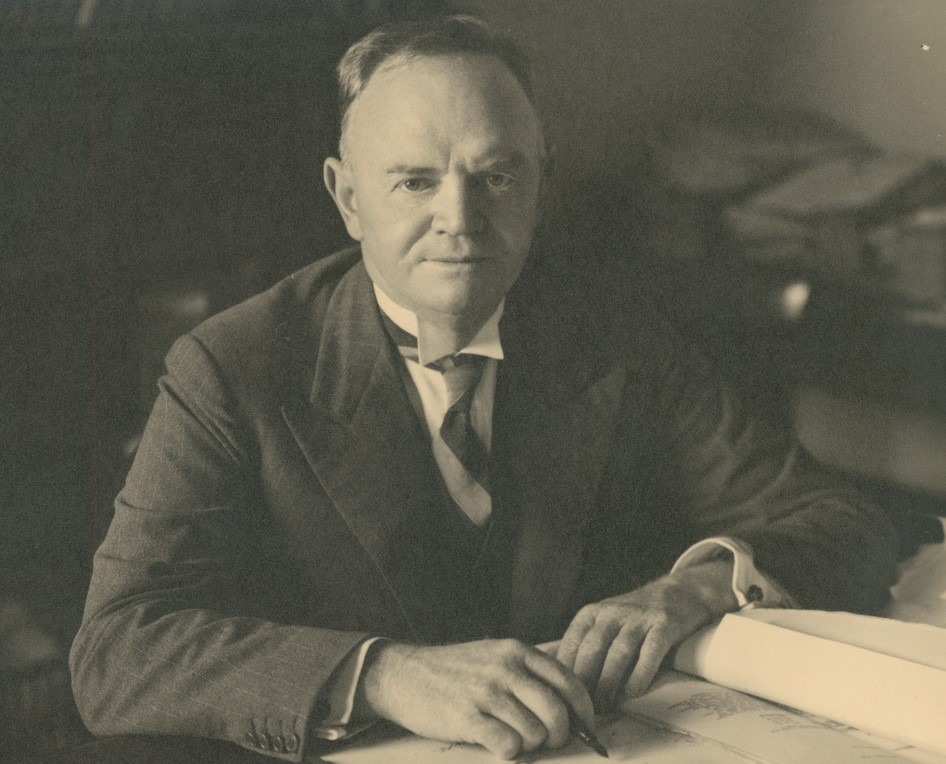
A. J. Hannan

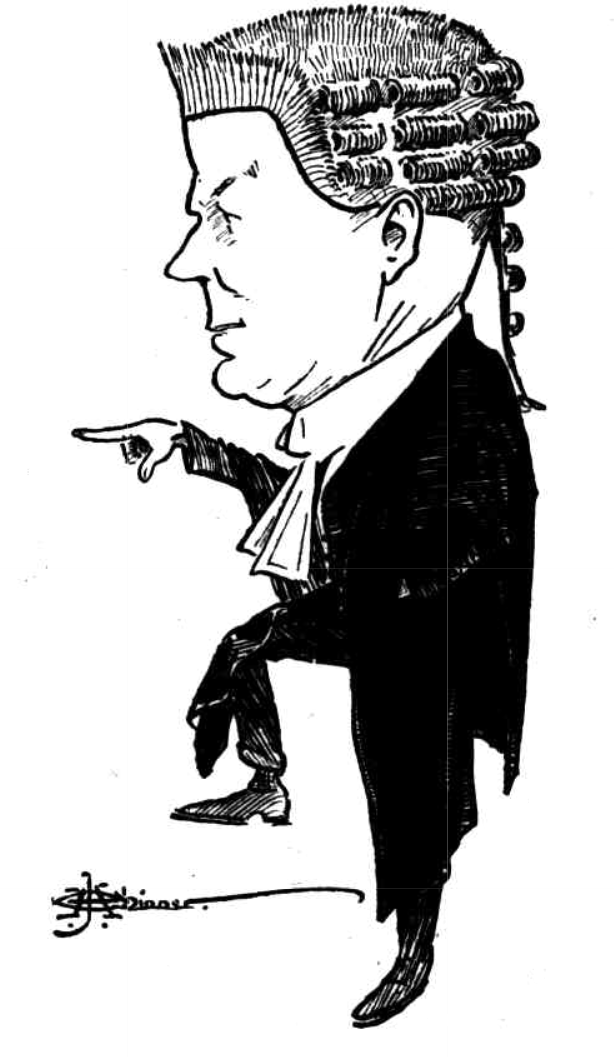
caricature by J. H. Chinner

Albert James Hannan QC (27 July 1887 – 1 January 1965) was a lawyer who was Crown Solicitor for South Australia for 25 years.

== History ==
He was born in Port Pirie, the eldest son of Francis Augustine "Frank" Hannan (1850 – 5 January 1931) and Mary Ellen Hannan (ca.1855 – 24 June 1934), and studied at the local school, then Sacred Heart College, Semaphore, followed by the University of Adelaide. After a brilliant scholastic career, winning the David Murray Scholarship in 1909 and 1912 and the Stow Prize in 1910 and 1912, he was awarded the LL.B. in 1912 and M.A. in 1914. Hannan joined the Education Department, and was admitted to the Bar in 1913, he became a permanent member of the Government service as Assistant then Parliamentary Draftsman before being appointed Assistant Crown Solicitor. He became Crown Solicitor in April 1927, and was lecturer in the theory of law and legislature, Roman law and jurisprudence at the University of Adelaide. He was a keen sportsman, excelling in tennis and lacrosse.

He represented the SA and WA Governments at the bank nationalisation appeal before the Privy Council in London in 1949.

He was a vehement critic of Common Cause, accusing the organisation of being either a Communist front or susceptible to takeover by Communists. He created a controversy when he publicly accused the (Labor) Commonwealth Government of tapping his telephone and interfering with his mail.

He retired at age 65 and was succeeded by R. R. Chamberlain Q.C.

== Family ==
He married Elizabeth Mary Catherine "Lily" Rzeszkowski ( – 7 December 1922) on 22 February 1919, lived at Valmai-avenue, King's Park, then Commercial Road, Hyde Park. He married again, on 7 March 1927, to Una Victoria Measday.

He died on 1 January 1965 at North Adelaide, survived by his wife and two daughters.

== Bibliography ==
- Hannan, A. J. Practical patriotism "Delivered before the Fifth Annual Conference, Adelaide, 11th September, 1935" Institute of Public Administration Annual Conference Adelaide, S. Aust. Education Department, Adelaide 1935.
- Hannan, A. J. Our second hundred years "Read before members of the Insurance Institute of South Australia, Monday, 22nd June, 1936" Insurance Institute of South Australia, Adelaide 1936.
- Hannan, A. J. Summary procedure of Justices in South Australia : being the Justices Act, 1921–1936 and the rules made thereunder Law Book Co., Adelaide 1939 / 4th ed. edited by L. McLean Wright. Law Book Co., Sydney 1975 ISBN 0455192596
- Hannan, A. J. The Life of Chief Justice Way Angus and Robertson, Sydney 1960.
