= Common Cause (South Australia) =

Australian think tank

Common Cause was an organisation formed during the Second World War to consider post-war reconstruction and society. It became a popular movement but was tainted by accusations of Communism.

== History ==
Common Cause was founded in 1943 as a vehicle for a number of idealistic community leaders of diverse backgrounds to discuss the post-war economic and social future of South Australia. Charter members were:

- Professor K. S. Isles (chairman)
- A. A. Angrave (secretary of Plasterers' Union)
- Dr. A. R. Callaghan (principal of Roseworthy College)
- Sidney Crawford (chairman of C.M.V. Motors)
- Charles Duguid (medical doctor and advocate for Aboriginal advancement)
- Tom Garland (secretary of the Gasworkers' Union)
- Rev. Guy Pentreath (head of St. Peter's College)
- Professor G. V. Portus
- Alex M. Ramsay (economist)
- W. A. Sams (State organiser for the Shop Assistants' Union and executive member of the Communist Party)
- Gilbert Seaman (statistical and research officer of the Commonwealth Treasury Department.)
- A. B. Thompson (president, United Trades and Labour Council)
- John W. Wainwright (Auditor-General, South Australian Government)
- D. R. Watson (hairdresser)

The idealistic aims of the organisation found favour with a large section of the community, disenchanted by the Great Depression and tired of the war and looking forward to a future of industrial peace and prosperity. A. J. Hannan of Medindie (the Crown Solicitor) was a prominent critic, accusing it of being either a Communist front organisation or susceptible to takeover by Communists by virtue of its open membership and support by the Union movement. Rev. E. S. Kiek of Parkin College made a passionate defence of Common Cause, and was supported by large number of ministers of religion who were also members.

At its first Annual General Meeting K. S. Isles, was re-elected president; vice presidents elected were A. B. Thompson and G. V. Portus; hon. treasurer L. J. Mulroney; minute secretary Maurice Brown; executive council Sidney Crawford, A. A. Drummond, Mrs. Fairbank, T. Garland, Mrs. K. S. Isles, J. H. Knight, and Dr. J. Lugg. They had a meeting room on Waymouth Street.

The organisation helped found a kindergarten and community centre at Nuriootpa, a town with a well-developed community spirit, and where the aims of Common Cause were particularly welcomed. In 1944 Common Cause published a booklet A Township starts to live : the valley of Barossa : South Australia's new community. Crawford, a prime mover in its foundation, retired shortly after.

Isles resigned as president on the eve of his departure for London on Army business.

Common Cause disbanded in 1949.
