= Percy Warrington =

The Reverend Percy Ewart Warrington (1889–1961) was an educationist and evangelical Church of England clergyman. He was vicar of Monkton Combe for forty-three years from 1918 to 1961 and the founder of an educational trust, Allied Schools, in the 1920s which founded and purchased a number of private schools in Britain and a girls' school in Kenya. He also founded homes for the elderly which continue today as the Warrington Homes Ltd. He was described as a 'financier in a surplice'.

== Early life ==
Warrington was born in Newhall, Derbyshire on 29 December 1889, where his father Thomas Warrington was a farmer. He attended Stapenhill School.

== Career ==
Warrington entered Hatfield College, Durham as an ordinand, where he obtained his licentiate in theology. He was ordained a deacon in 1914 and priest in 1915 at Worcester Cathedral for St Matthew's Church, Rugby, Warwickshire. In 1917 he moved to St Peter's, Congleton, Cheshire and in 1918 he accepted the benefice of Monkton Combe in the Bath and Wells diocese, a small village in which Monkton Combe School was based. Warrington would later describe his experience in Monkton Combe as a 'living hell'. This was likely due to a rift that developed between himself and the school when he accused pupils of heckling him as he preached, an accusation that was roundly refuted by the Headmaster. However, in later years a happier relationship developed.

== Allied Schools Trust ==
Warrington became secretary to the Church Trust Society, through which he founded a series of schools, typically by purchasing country houses and then converting them. Wrekin College was acquired in 1921. In 1923, Warrington saw an advertisement in The Times for Canford Manor and bought it the same day, founding Canford School which opened on 15 May 1923. In the same year he purchased Stowe House from the estate of the Dukes of Buckingham in which Stowe School was established. In 1928 he purchased Weston Birt as a public school for girls; Westonbirt School. This was followed in 1929 by Felixstowe College.

The Allied Schools Trust was developed which incorporated the Church Trust Society and was renamed The Martyrs Memorial. Eventually, the Trust administered some thirteen public schools.

The financial activities related to the founding of these schools have been described as a 'reverse ponzi scheme'. Each successive school was founded by raising a mortgage on the last, with the financial years of the schools ending in different months, with all the cash balances being placed into the school that was next to report.

The Trust ran into severe financial difficulties during the years of depression in the early 1930s and was rescued by the intervention of the Legal & General Assurance Society through a mortgage that was not paid off until 1980. As a consequence, Warrington lost his positions except from his living at Monkton Combe, with the schools he founded becoming the Allied Schools group.

In 1934 he acquired Stoke House in Bristol, which became the Clifton Theological College for Church of England candidates by ordination (later merged with others to become Trinity College, Bristol).

Warrington was instrumental in the founding of the evangelical St Peter's College, Oxford, through financial assistance provided to Christopher Chavasse.

In 1946 he founded Warrington Homes Ltd, which today offers residential care for the elderly in two homes in Corsham, Wiltshire.

== Pentonville Church ==
Warrington was a vigorous supporter of the restoration of Pentonville Church, London, which was derelict after World War I. The church was reconsecrated in 1933.

== Death ==
Warrington died in a nursing home in Bath in 1961, leaving an estate valued at £47,000.
