= Adam Smith Prize =

Economics award

The Adam Smith Prizes are prizes currently awarded for the best overall examination performance and best dissertation in Part IIB of the Economics Tripos (the graduation examination for economics undergraduates) at the University of Cambridge. The prize - named after Scottish philosopher and economist Adam Smith - was originally established in 1891 and awarded triennially for the best submitted essay on a subject of the writer's choice.

== List of past recipients ==
- 1894 Arthur Lyon Bowley
- 1897 Frederick Pethick-Lawrence, 1st Baron Pethick-Lawrence
- 1900 Sydney Chapman
- 1903 Arthur Cecil Pigou
- 1906 Ernest Alfred Benians
- 1909 John Maynard Keynes
- 1914 Claude Guillebaud
- 1929 R. F. Kahn
- 1930 Ruth Cohen
- 1932 K. S. Isles
- 1933 B. P. Adarkar
- 1935 W. B. Reddaway
- 1936 D. G. Champernowne
- 1948 I. G. Patel
- 1954 Amartya Sen
- 1956 Manmohan Singh
- 1974 Martin Osborne
- 1987 Richard J. Parkin
- 2000 Saugato Datta and Richard Fearon
- 2004 James Benford and Simon Iversen
- 2006 Mark Shields and Johannes Wieland
- 2007 Stefanie Stantcheva
- 2008 Thomas Mckendrick and Shivam Patel
- 2009 Praneet Shah
- 2011 Ossie Akushie and Shafi Anwar
- 2012 Dhruva Murugasu
- 2013 Anna Stansbury, Inna Grinis and Ivan Kuznetsov
- 2014 James Walker
- 2015 Ben Andrews and Jonathon Hazell
- 2016 Isar Bhattacharjee and Toni Oki
- 2017 Joel Flynn and Joseph Lee
- 2018 Tireni Ajilore, George Nikolakoudis, Laurence O’Brien and Sajan Shah
- 2019 Vlastimil Rasocha and Kuishuai Yi
- 2020 Neal Patel, David Lee, Liam Grant, Andrew Koh and Michael Bennett
- 2021 Valerie Chuang, Matthew Lee Chen and Jack Golden
- 2022 George Gatsios, Mahin Vekaria, Eu-Wayne Mok and Gaon Kim
- 2023 Hiroaki Endo and James Legrand
- 2024 Taneesha Datta, Vignesh Kamath, James Yu and Emmanuel Jason Adrianus Sutanto
- 2025 Amandeep Singh, Max Sanders, Wei Kang Lee, and Sumedh Brahmadevara
- 2026 Tim Chee, Seyane Sivindran, and Harrison Emery

== See also ==
- List of economics awards
