= Elizabeth Lemarchand =

English novelist (1906–2000)

Elizabeth Wharton Lemarchand (27 October 1906 – 2000) was a British writer of detective novels and short stories.

Born in Barnstaple, Devon on 27 October 1906, she was a teacher by profession. Lemarchand was employed as deputy headmistress of the Godolphin School, Salisbury from 1943 until 1960, and as acting headmistress in 1959. She then moved to Lowther College in Wales where she was headmistress from 1960 until 1961.

Her novels feature CDI Tom Pollard and his assistant Sergeant Toye of Scotland Yard. The first, Death of an Old Girl, was published in 1967; it was followed by 16 others. Stylistically, Lemarchand has been called "a novelist who has absorbed the general airs and graces of the Golden Age of Detection of the 1920s and 1930s, taken them to heart, but updated them to the period of the 1960s."

She died in Devon in 2000, at the age of 94.

== Novels ==
List from

- Death of an Old Girl (1967)
- The Affacombe Affair (1968)
- Alibi for a Corpse (1969)
- Death on Doomsday (1971)
- Cyanide With Compliments (1972)
- No Vacation from Murder (1973)
- Buried in the Past (1974)
- Step in the Dark (1976)
- Unhappy Returns (1977)
- Suddenly While Gardening (1978)
- Change for the Worse (1980)
- Nothing to Do with the Case (1981)
- Troubled Waters (1982)
- The Wheel Turns (1983)
- Light Through the Glass (1984)
- Who Goes Home? (1986)
- The Glade Manor Murder (1988)
