= John Charles Price =

British judge

His Honour John Charles Price is a retired British judge.

== Life ==
John Charles Price was educated at Wrekin College in Shropshire. He graduated with an LLB degree in law from Birmingham University in 1967. He was called to the Bar by Gray's Inn in 1969. He was appointed an Assistant Recorder in 1990 and a Recorder in 1996.

Price was appointed a Circuit Judge in 2003. He sat at Southwark Crown Court. Price gave strong support to the work of the Victim Support Witness Service. He addressed the All Party Parliamentary Group for Victims and Witnesses on 9 October 2013 which was attended by more than fifty MPs, including co-chairs Priti Patel MP and Rob Flello MP. Price stated:

'I'm absolutely convinced by the work of the Victim Support Witness Service – they keep witnesses calm, they stop them clamming up. I want to see more of them, more help for them because they are volunteers and their work is exceptional. They help witnesses give better evidence and they save money by keeping trials running.'

His Honour John Price retired as a Circuit Judge in March 2015.
