= Howard Frederick Hobbs =

South Australian Inventor

Howard Frederick Hobbs (21 September 1902 – 15 December 1982) was a South Australian inventor, a pioneer of automatic transmission for motor vehicles. In 1932 he moved to England, where he spent the rest of his life developing automatic gearboxes that failed to find a market.

== History ==
Hobbs was born in Adelaide a son of J(ohn) Harris Hobbs and Mary Eliza Hobbs, née Pitt, of Payneham and studied at Prince Alfred College, where he was successful academically and in athletics. His brothers Norman Theodore Hobbs and ?? were educated at the same school. He left school at age 15, to work on his father's orchard and market garden.

In his spare time, he worked on a series of mechanical inventions. He never underwent higher education and his engineering knowledge and abilities were entirely self-taught.

He married Phyllis Dorothy Reid in 1927; they had a daughter Barbara on 5 May 1927. They lived in Paradise, a suburb of Adelaide, where he spent seven years working on his automatically variable gearbox until he had a working model operating in a "baby Austin" car. His invention won the support of professors R. W. Chapman and Kerr Grant of Adelaide University. A parts breakdown may be viewed here.

A company, Hobbs Gearless Drive Limited, was founded in June 1931 with capital of £12,250 in £1 shares, to exploit the invention. Sidney Crawford of Adelaide Motors, L. M. Anderson, R. Deaves (engineer) of St. Peters, H. F. Hobbs (inventor), and his father J. H. Hobbs were the directors. J. H. Hobbs was company chairman. Other investors were G. H. Scott (factory representative for New Zealand of Austin Motor Car Company, Limited. Wellington), W. G. T. Goodman (engineer), and Adelaide Motors Limited. Both of the Hobbs and R. Deaves also invested in the company.

Hobbs sailed for England with his family to demonstrate the invention to engineers at Coventry. The Hobbs settled in Leamington Spa, and had two more children: John on 1 July 1933 and on 9 June 1939, son David was born. David Hobbs had a long and storied international motor racing career including driving Sports Cars at Le Mans and in the World Sportscar Championship, as well as racing in 7 Formula One Grands Prix. David also became a well known motor racing television commentator and analyst, usually working out of America with networks such as CBS, ESPN, Speed and NBCSN, working alongside such callers as Ken Squier, Chris Economaki, Bob Varsha, John Bisignano, Ned Jarrett and Jackie Stewart.

In 1932, after some satisfactory test results, another £50,000 in shares was issued, and Sidney Crawford was elected managing director.

No major auto manufacturer ever signed a contract, and the company was wound up in 1941.

Hobbs persisted, and founded Hobbs Transmissions Ltd. at Leamington Spa in 1946. In 1950 he produced a hydraulically operated four-speed "Mechamatic" gearbox, which was lighter and more compact than the American models, and found a few buyers. A later company was Variable Kinetic Drives, Ltd., which was granted three key patents.

== Other interests ==
- He was a fine singer, performing at weddings and other occasions
- He was an excellent golfer
