= Stephen Chapman (judge) =

British barrister and High Court judge

Sir Stephen Chapman (5 June 1907 – 23 March 1991) was a British barrister and High Court judge who sat in the Queen's Bench Division from 1966 to 1981.

== Biography ==
Stephen Chapman was the second son of the economist Sir Sydney Chapman, Chief Economic Adviser to HM Government, and Lady (Mabel Gwendoline) Chapman. He was educated at Westminster School, where he was a King's Scholar and captain of school, and Trinity College, Cambridge, where he was an entrance scholar and major scholar. At Cambridge, he won the Browne Medal in 1927 and 1928, as well as the John Stewart of Rannoch Scholarship in 1928. He graduated with first-class honours in Part I (1927) and Part II (1929) of the classical tripos.

Turning to the law, Chapman was an entrance scholar at the Inner Temple in 1929 and won the Jardine studentship in 1931. He achieved first-class honours at the 1931 Bar finals, as well as a certificate of honour. He was called to the Bar by the Inner Temple in 1931.
