= Henry Twells =

English clergyman, hymn writer, and poet

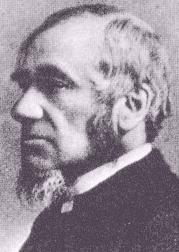
- This photograph appears in the frontispiece of Ingram's biography of Twells
- Born: 13 March 1823; Ashted, Birmingham, UK
- Died: 19 January 1900 (aged 76); Bournemouth, Dorset, UK
- Occupations: Clergyman; Hymn-writer; Poet
- Spouse: Ellen Jane Tompson
- Writing career
- Genres: Hymns, Poems
- Notable works: "At Even, Ere the Sun Was Set"; "Time's Paces"

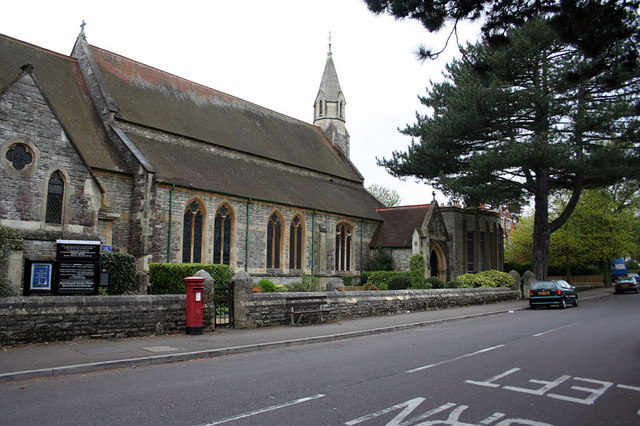
St. Augustin's Church, Bournemouth

Rev. Canon Henry Twells (1823–1900) was an Anglican clergyman, hymn writer and poet. His best known hymn was "At Even, Ere the Sun Was Set", which was put to music by George Joseph, whose tune Angelus was first printed in 1657. He also wrote the well-known poem, "Time's Paces" that depicts the apparent speeding up of time as we become older. A younger brother, Edward Twells, was the first Bishop of Bloemfontein.

== Life ==
Henry Twells was the son of Philip Mellor Twells, born in Ashted, Birmingham on 13 March 1823. He went to school at King Edward's School, Birmingham and then to Peterhouse, University of Cambridge, from where he graduated B.A. in 1848 and M.A. in 1851. On 25 May 1875, he married Ellen Jane Tompson, daughter of the Rev. Matthew Carrier Tompson, for fifty years Vicar of Alderminster, near Stratford-on-Avon. He died in Bournemouth on 19 January 1900.

== Career ==
- 1849 - Ordained as deacon at Rochester Cathedral.
- 1850 - Ordained as priest in the Church of England.
- 1849-1851 - Curate in Berkhamsted and then
- 1851-1854 - Curate at the parish church of Holy Trinity, Stratford-upon-Avon.
- 1854-1856 - Master of St. Andrew's House School in Mells, Somerset.
- 1856-1870 - Headmaster of Godolphin School, Hammersmith, London.
- 1870-1871 - Rector of Baldock, Hertfordshire.
- 1871-1890 - Rector of Waltham on the Wolds, Lincolnshire.
- 1884 - Appointed as Honorary Canon of Peterborough Cathedral.
- 1890 - 'Semi-retired' in Bournemouth where he commissioned the building of St. Augustin's church dedicated to St. Augustine of Hippo and he remained 'priest-in-charge' there till his death.

== Publications ==
- Poetry for Repetition. Edited by Rev. Henry Twells, M.A. Head Master of the Godolphin Foundation School, Hammersmith. London: Longman, Green, Longman, and Roberts, 1862
- Hymnal Oratorio, The Apostle of the Gentiles: Being the life and writings of St Paul, as illustrated by Hymns Ancient and Modern, and interspersed with recitations from Holy Scripture, etc. London: Clowes & Sons, 1881.
- Hymnal Oratorio, The Forerunner: Being the life and teaching of John the Baptist, as illustrated by Hymns Ancient and Modern, and interspersed with recitations from Holy Scripture. In two parts. Arranged by Henry Twells. London: William Clowes & Sons, 1886.
- Extension of the Diaconate. A speech delivered in the Lower House of the Convocation of Canterbury, etc. London: Rivingtons, 1887.
- Colloquies on Preaching. London: Longmans & Co., 1889.
- Hymns and Other Stray Verses. London: Wells Gardner, Darton & Co, 1901.
- Sermons on Hymns, and Other Addresses. London: Wells Gardner & Co., [1901].
- Bible Characters, and Other Addresses. London: Wells Gardner & Co., 1905.
