= Wrekin College =

Public school in Shropshire, England

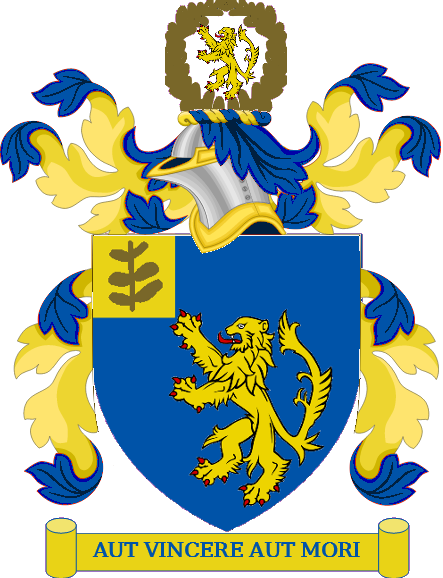

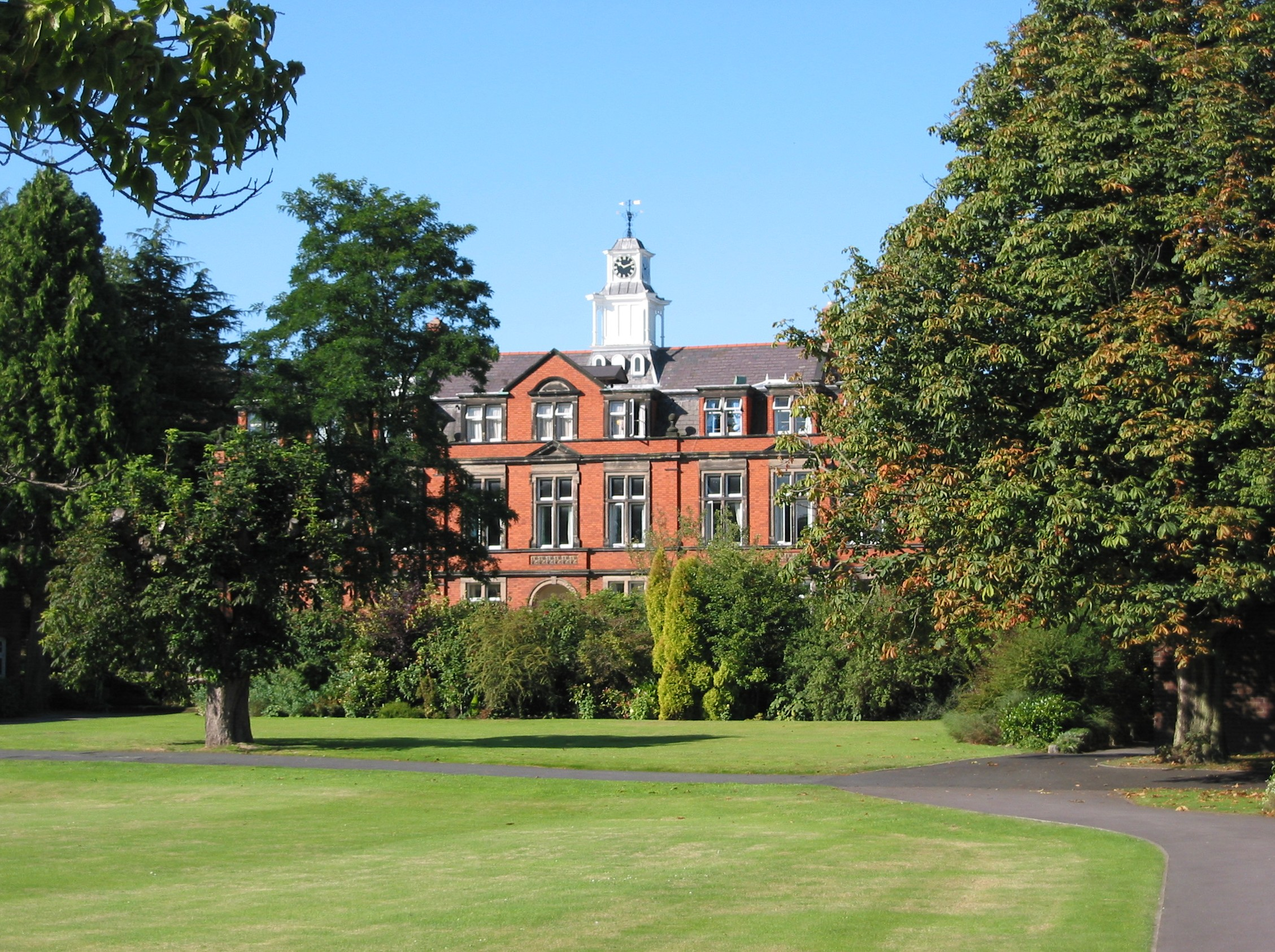

Location
- Sutherland Road; Wellington, Shropshire, TF1 3BH; England; 52.7024°N 2.5100°W

Information
- Type: Public School; Private day and boarding school
- Motto: Latin: Aut vincere aut mori (Either to conquer or to die)
- Religious affiliation: Church of England
- Established: 1880 (Wrekin College); 1835 The Old Hall School
- Founder: Sir John Bayley (Wrekin College); Dr J Edward. Cranage (Old Hall School)
- Chairman of Governing Body: Emma Crawford
- Headteachers: Craig Williams - Wrekin Prep Ben Smith and Simon Platford MBE - Wrekin College
- Gender: Co-educational
- Age: 11 (Wrekin College); 4 (Wrekin Prep) to 18 (Wrekin College; 11 (Wrekin Prep)
- Enrollment: 560 (Wrekin College); 229 (Wrekin Prepl)
- Houses: Bayley, Clarkson, Lancaster, Roslyn, Tudor, York. Former houses: Hanover, Norman, Eastfield, Saxon. Windsor, Old Hall houses: Ercall, Leighton, Wenlock, Cressage
- Colours: Wrekin College: The Old Hall School:
- Publication: The Wrekinian

Wrekin College is a private co-educational boarding and day school located in Wellington, Shropshire, England. It was founded by Sir John Bayley in 1880.

In 2006, The Old Hall School, a distinct preparatory school that had existed since 1835, merged with Wrekin College. While they operated as a single trust and shared a campus, the two schools maintained their separate identities until 2025. In that year, Wrekin College officially closed The Old Hall School, and immediately opened a new preparatory school on the same site under the new name of Wrekin Prep.

Part of the Allied Schools, it is also a member of the Headmasters' and Headmistresses' Conference.

== History ==
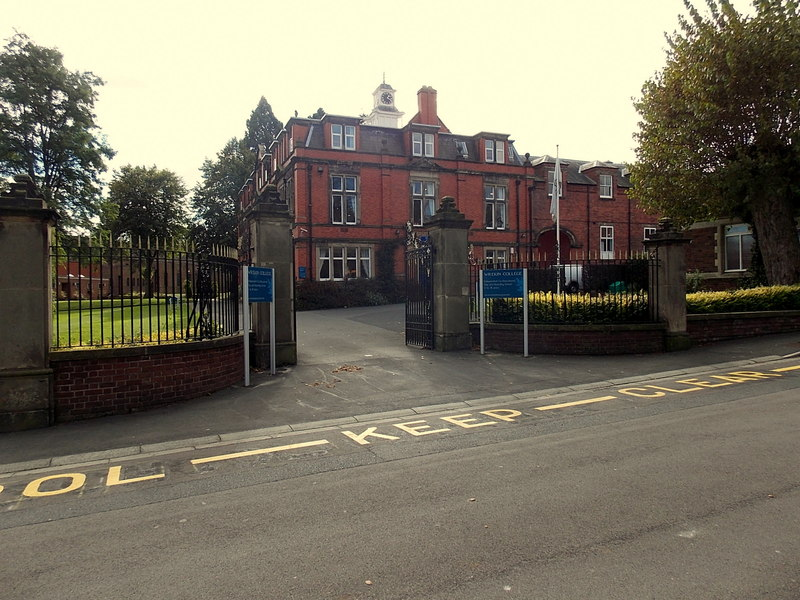
Main entrance to Wrekin College

=== Wrekin College ===
The school was founded in 1880 as Wellington College by Sir John Bayley.

In 1915 less than 100 acres (40 hectares) of the Lilleshall Hall estate were purchased from the Duke of Sutherland, who retained the Hall and 50 acres (20 hectares).

In 1920, it was sold to the Revd Percy Warrington, a Church of England clergyman and renamed Wrekin College. The Rev. Canon Guy Pentreath was a notable headmaster from 1943 to 1952.

Girls were introduced to the sixth form by headmaster Geoffrey Hadden in 1975.

It became fully co-educational in the year 1983. There are currently approximately 560 pupils including a number of international boarders.

The school admits pupils from the age of eleven.

=== Wrekin Prep ===
The Old Hall School was renamed Wrekin Prep in 2025.

== Headteachers ==
=== Wrekin College ===
- 2025-: Vacant (acting joint heads) Ben Smith and Simon Platford
- 2023-25: Toby Spence
- 2016-2023: Tim Firth
- 2013-16: Dr. Hayden Griffiths
- 2011-2013 Richard Pleming
- 1998-2011: Stephen Drew
- Pre 1998 John Arkell

=== Wrekin Prep ===
- 2026- announced that Craig Williams will become head in January 2026
- 2025-26 - Vacant (acting head) Alison Hartland-Griffiths

=== The Old Hall School (renamed as "Wrekin Prep" in 2025) ===
- 2022-2025: Anna Karacan,
- 2007-2022: Martin Stott
- 1987-2007: Ronald Ward
- ?1962-1987 Peter Worthington
- List incomplete
- 1847-: Dr Cranage

== Notable staff ==
- Patrick Cormack, Baron Cormack (1939-2024) Conservative MP 1979 to 2010 - assistant house master at Wrekin College 1967-1969
- Rev Canon Guy Pentreath (1902-1985) - headmaster of Wrekin College 1943-1952, later headmaster of Cheltenham College.

== Sports ==
In 2023 Wrekin was named as one of The Cricketer’s Top 100 cricketing schools in the country and in 2022 both the Under 16 and Under 13 rugby teams were named county champions.

== Cocurricular ==
A music school was opened in 2020 costing over £2m.

== Royal visit ==
Queen Elizabeth II visited Wrekin on Friday 17 March 1967, having opened Shire Hall in Shrewsbury earlier that day. The Headmaster, Robert Dahl (Headmaster. 1952-71), greeted the Queen, and in his study presented a specially bound copy of B.C.W Johnson’s A Brief History of Wrekin College, whilst Head of School, David Franklin (W. 1961-67) was given the honour of presenting a cricket bat for her sons.

== Merger of the Old Hall and Wrekin trusts. ==
In 2006, the trust was merged with that of The Old Hall Preparatory School (founded 1845), which moved from its original site on Limekiln Lane to the site of Wrekin College.

The resulting trust is called The Wrekin Old Hall Trust.

== The Old Hall School (renamed Wrekin Prep in 2025) ==
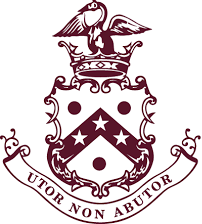
The coat of arms of The Old Hall School - established for around 180 year before being closed and re-opened as Wrekin Prep

The Old Hall Preparatory School run from Wellington 0f 190 years until 2025 when it was renamed as Wrekin Prep.

It was founded in 1835 by Dr J.E. (Joseph Edward) Cranage, providing originally for the education of boys only, being described in 1891 as:

one of the most widely known and popular educational establishments for gentlemen's sons in the Midlands

In founding the school, Cranage was inspired by the example of Thomas Arnold at Rugby School, he was aged just nineteen years at the time but had already completed an MA and PhD. The school promised a:

A general and thoroughly liberal education is given. Boys are prepared for the Universities.. without a too exclusive attention to Greek and Latin

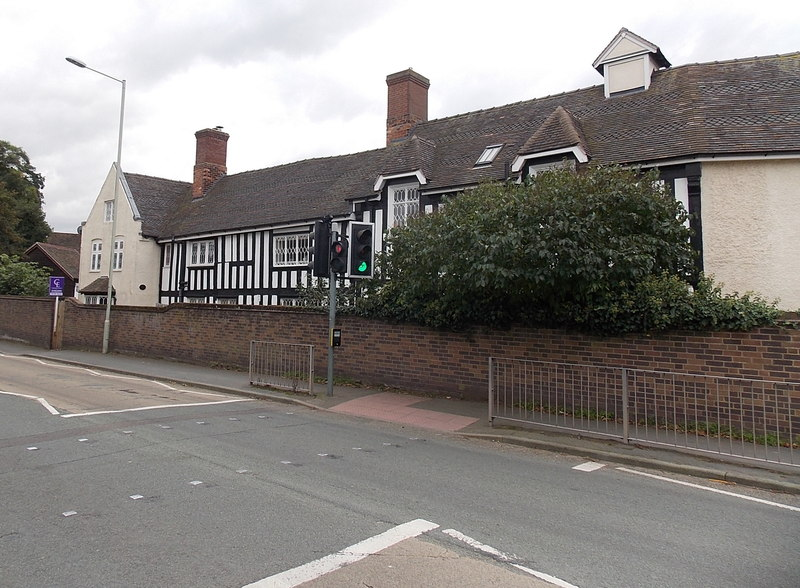
The high medieval or C16th building which was the original site of the Old Hall School between 1845 and 2007

It operated for its first century and a half from a building understood to have been constructed in the 1400s.

A chapel was added as a war memorial in 1922. That chapel has since been converted into a residence, but the memorial tablets were moved to the Wrekin College chapel.

Pupils of the school included Crown Princes of India, and David Morrieson Panton. Its motto was in Latin: "Utor non abutor" (I use, I do not abuse).

The writer Bruce Chatwin attended the school, The London Review of Books published The Seventh Day, practically the last story Bruce Chatwin wrote. The semi-autobiographical account of a "nervous and skinny boy with thick fair hair" who hated boarding school so much he developed a near fatal bout of constipation, the tale was largely based on the writer’s own experiences at The Old Hall.

The Old Hall appointed Ms Anna Karacan as headteacher in 2022, the first woman to hold the role in 188 years of the school to that point.

== Notable alumni ==
- William Dyas MBE (1872-1940), first-class cricketer
- Sir Albert Howard CIE (1873-1947), English botanist and pioneer of organic agriculture
- Harry Andrews CBE (1911–1989), British stage and film actor
- William R. P. George CBE (1912–2006), Welsh poet
- Sir Peter Gadsden GBE, AC (1929–2006), former Lord Mayor of London (1979), businessman
- Brian Epstein (1934–1967), music entrepreneur and manager of The Beatles
- Peter Inge, Baron Inge KG, GCB, PC, DL (1935–2022), former Chief of Defence Staff
- Guy N. Smith (1939-2020), writer mainly of horror and science fiction
- Malcolm Bruce, Baron Bruce (1944- ), former Liberal Democrat MP
- Bob Warman MBE (1948 – ), television presenter
- Ian Blair, Baron Blair QPM (1953–2025), Metropolitan Police Commissioner (2005–2008)
- Brothers Barry (1955- ) and Bryan Jones (1961- ), cricketers
- Peter Chelsom (1956- ), film director
- John Charles Price, Circuit Judge
- Christopher Blagden (1971- ), former British alpine skier who competed at the Albertville Winter Olympic Games, 1992

== Other sources ==
- Manwaring, Randle (2002). From Controversy to Co-Existence: Evangelicals in the Church of England 1914–1980. Cambridge: CUP. p. 57.
