= Bodelwyddan Castle =

Castle in Denbighshire, Wales

Coordinates: 53°15′40″N 03°30′06″W

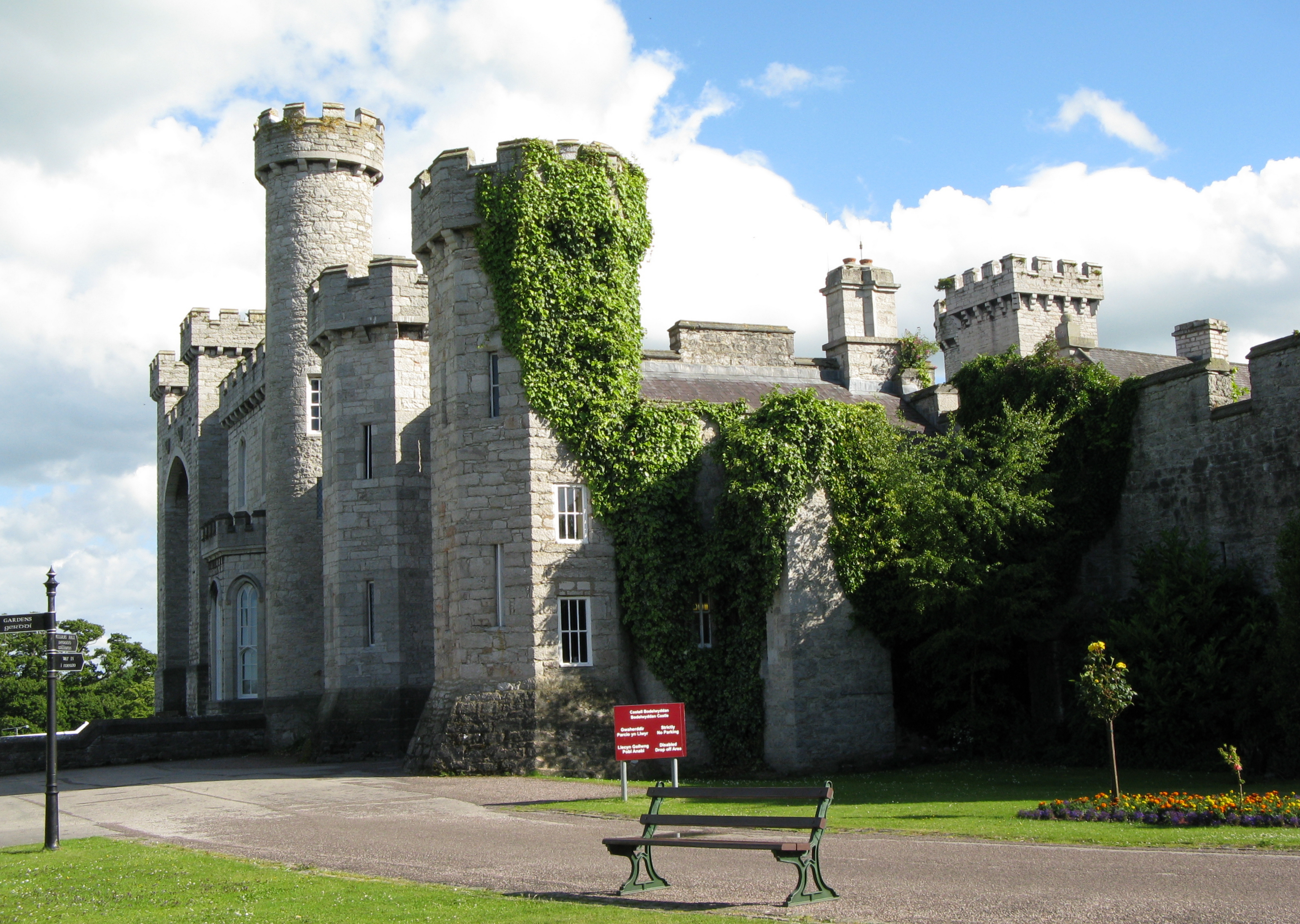
Bodelwyddan Castle

Bodelwyddan Castle (Welsh: Castell Bodelwyddan), close to the village of Bodelwyddan, near Rhyl, Denbighshire in Wales, was built around 1460 by the Humphreys family of Anglesey as a manor house. It was associated with the Williams-Wynn family for around 200 years from 1690. It has been a Grade II* listed building since 1962 as a "Gothick castellated style in the early C19". Having been opened to the public as a historic house museum, as of mid 2019, it was up for sale and the historic building was closed to the public.

By August 2019, the grounds and attractions were also closed, but the nearby hotel (independently operated) was not affected.

== History ==
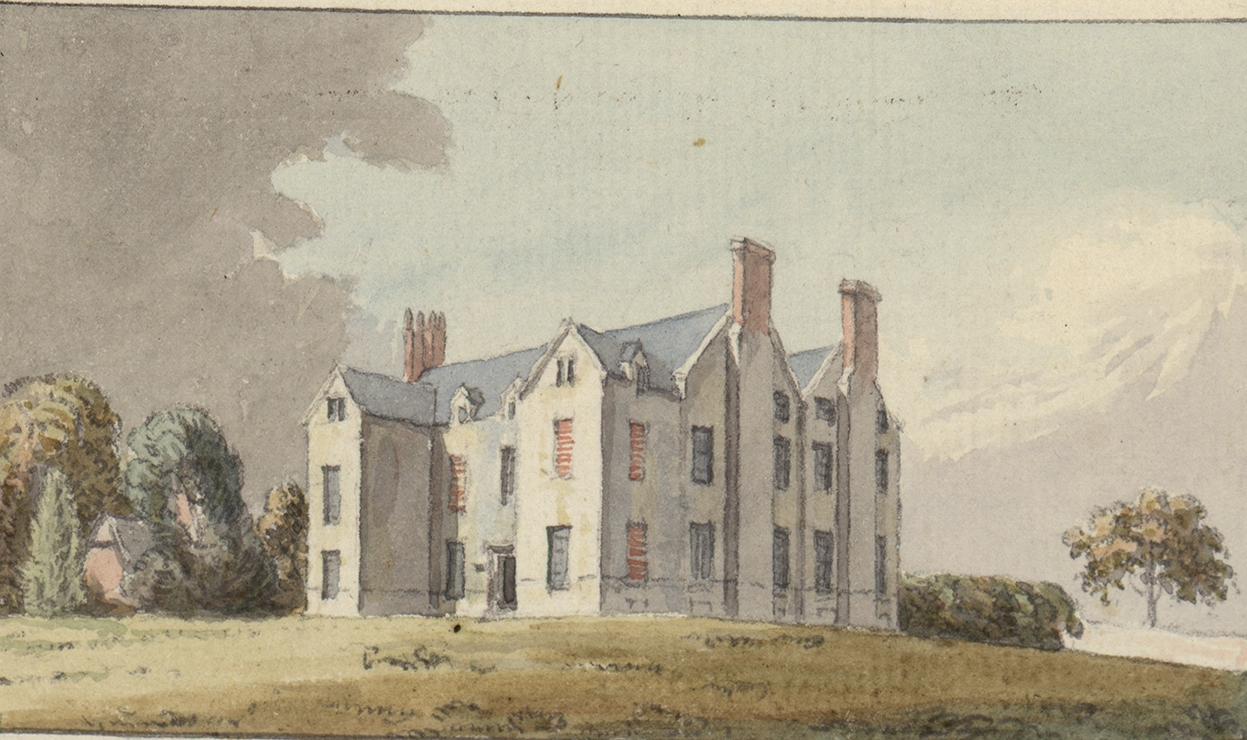
Watercolour of the house that preceded Bodelwyddan Castle c. 1781

The castle was bought from the Humphreys by Sir William Williams, Speaker of the House of Commons from 1680 to 1681.

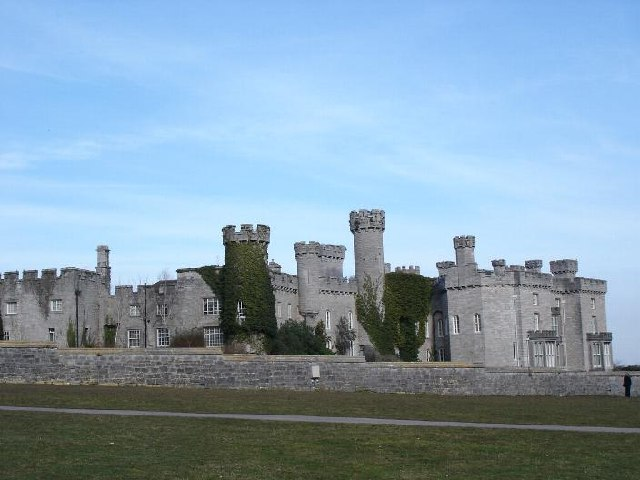
Bodelwyddan Castle

The castle was remodeled in 1805 into a Greek Revival style and then reconstructed between 1830 and 1832 by Sir John Hay Williams, who employed the architects Joseph Hansom (inventor of the Hansom cab) and Edward Welch to refurbish and extend the house; the modifications made it into the castellated style.

The castle has been described as one of Hansom's most ambitious projects, "being wildly dramatic and owing nothing to its predecessors". At the same time works were carried out to construct an estate wall and formal gardens.

By the First World War the house had become a recuperation hospital for wounded soldiers. During this time, the grounds of the estate were used by soldiers based at the nearby Kinmel Camp for trench warfare training. Traces of these trenches can still be seen.

According to WalesOnline, the castle has been reported as haunted.

=== Lowther College ===
By 1920, the cost of maintaining the castle and estate had grown too burdensome, and the Williams family leased Bodelwyddan to Lowther College, a girls' private school. The school was formed in 1896 at Lytham St. Annes in Lancashire by Florence Lindley. Lowther College purchased the property five years later, in 1925. The school is thought to have been one of the first private schools for girls to have its own swimming pool. It also had a private golf course. The Lowther College Tableaux were well regarded within the community for their musical excellence. Boys were admitted from 1977. The school closed in 1982 due to financial problems.

=== Museum and arts centre ===
In the 1980s, the site was bought by Clwyd County Council with the aim of developing the castle as a visitor attraction. The historic house and grounds were opened to the public and managed by Bodelwyddan Castle Trust, an independent registered charity.

Partnerships were formed with the National Portrait Gallery and the Royal Academy of Arts, so that the castle could be used to display objects from these collections. In order to house these items, the interior of the castle was restored by Roderick Gradidge, an expert on Victorian architecture. The portrait gallery opened in 1988 and was named Museum of the Year in 1989. The castle's association with the National Portrait Gallery came to an end in 2017 after its funding was cut by Denbighshire County Council.

=== Closure of the castle and grounds ===
In 2017 Denbighshire County Council decided to sell the site.

In February 2019, the property's 99-year lease castle was still listed for sale; by June 2019, the Bodelwyddan Castle Trust stated that the historic house had been closed. The gardens and park remained open to visitors at that time. In August 2019, the trustees advised that in addition to the castle, "public access is no longer granted for the woodlands, parklands, play area and trench experience".

In mid-2021, Bourne Leisure Hotels agreed to purchase the remaining part of the Castle from Denbighshire County Council which had bought the lease to the building. Bourne planned to fully refurbish the castle and to operate it via its Warner Leisure Hotels subsidiary which was already operating the hotel area on the property. The council would retain the woodland, the meadow, a car park and the agricultural lands as well as the small lodge on the edge of the property.

=== Bodelwyddan Castle Hotel ===
Part of the site was leased to the Rank Organisation in 1994 for development into a luxury hotel, Bodelwyddan Castle Hotel, operated by Warner Leisure Hotels. According to the historic listing, the hotel is located "within the domestic yard".

The historic house and grounds are distinct from the hotel, although Warner did consider purchasing the site in 2017.

During the closure of the castle to tourists, the hotel area of the property was not affected and continued to operate.

== Gardens ==
The castle is set within a large area of parkland, and formal gardens, the most recent of which was originally designed by Thomas Hayton Mawson in 1910.

== Bodelwyddan Castle Gallery ==
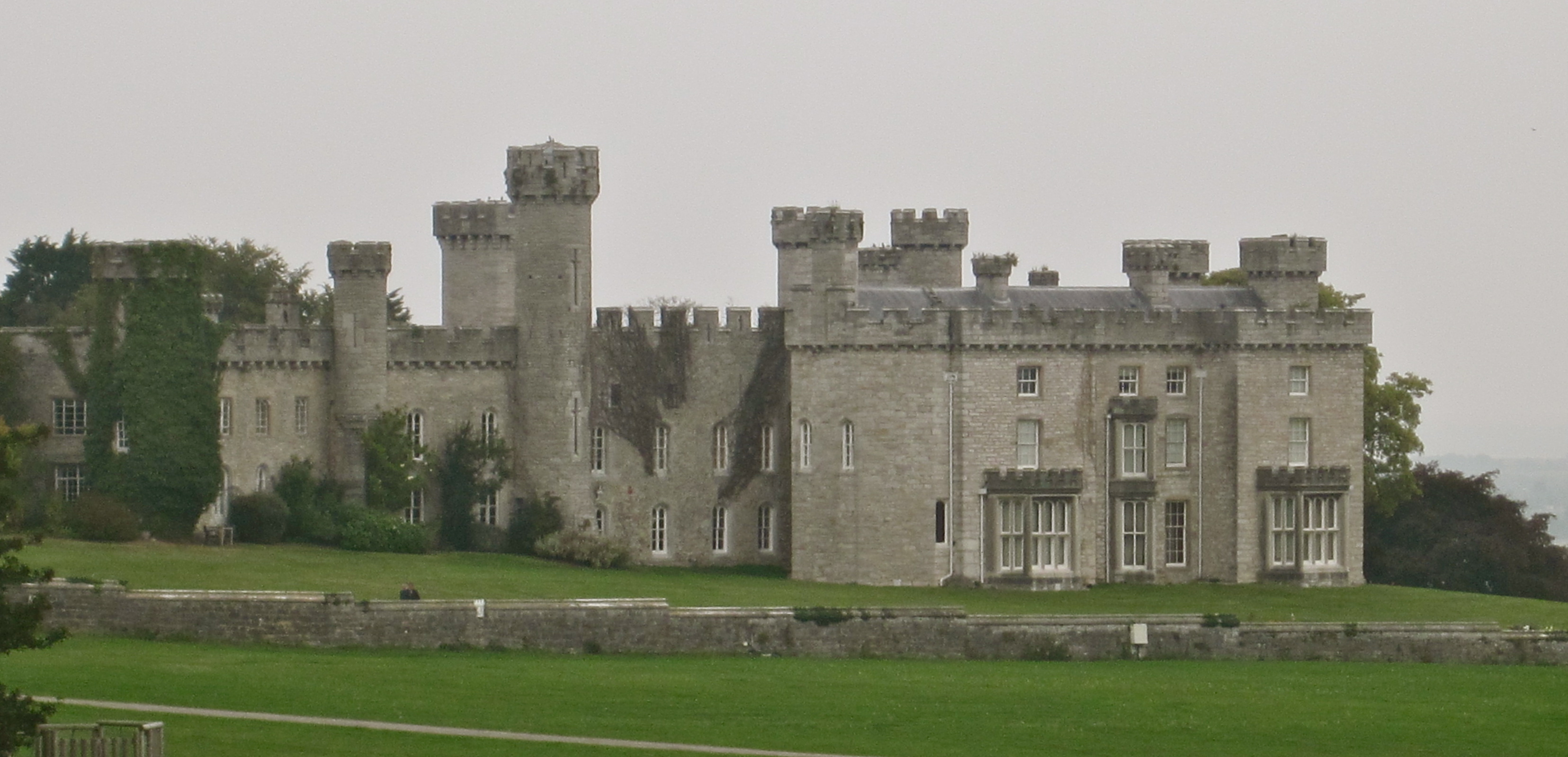
Bodelwyddan Castle

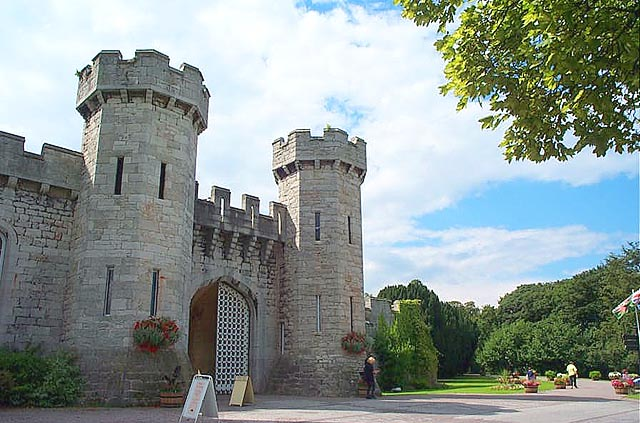
Bodelwyddan Castle Main gateway.

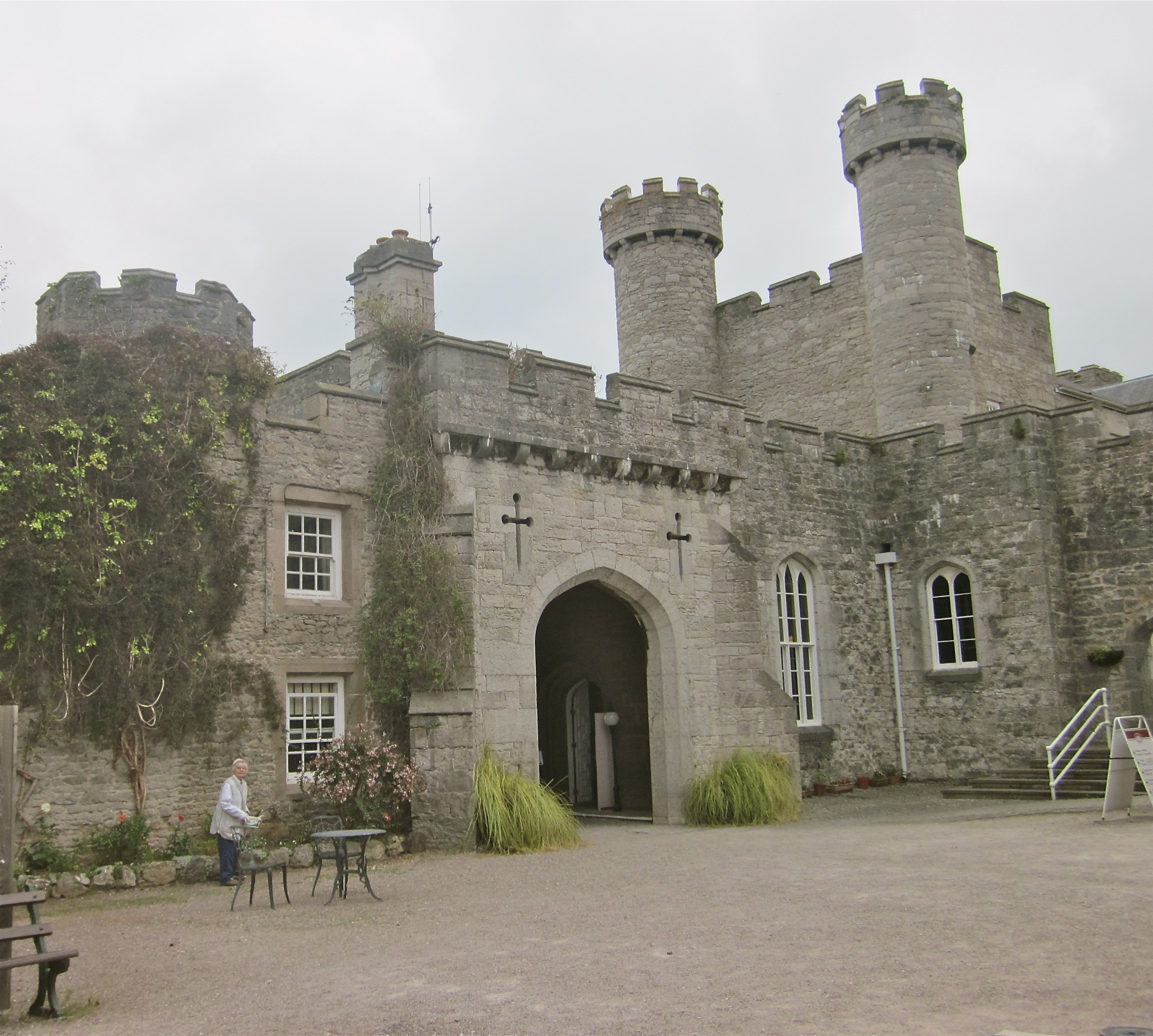
Bodelwyddan Castle 02

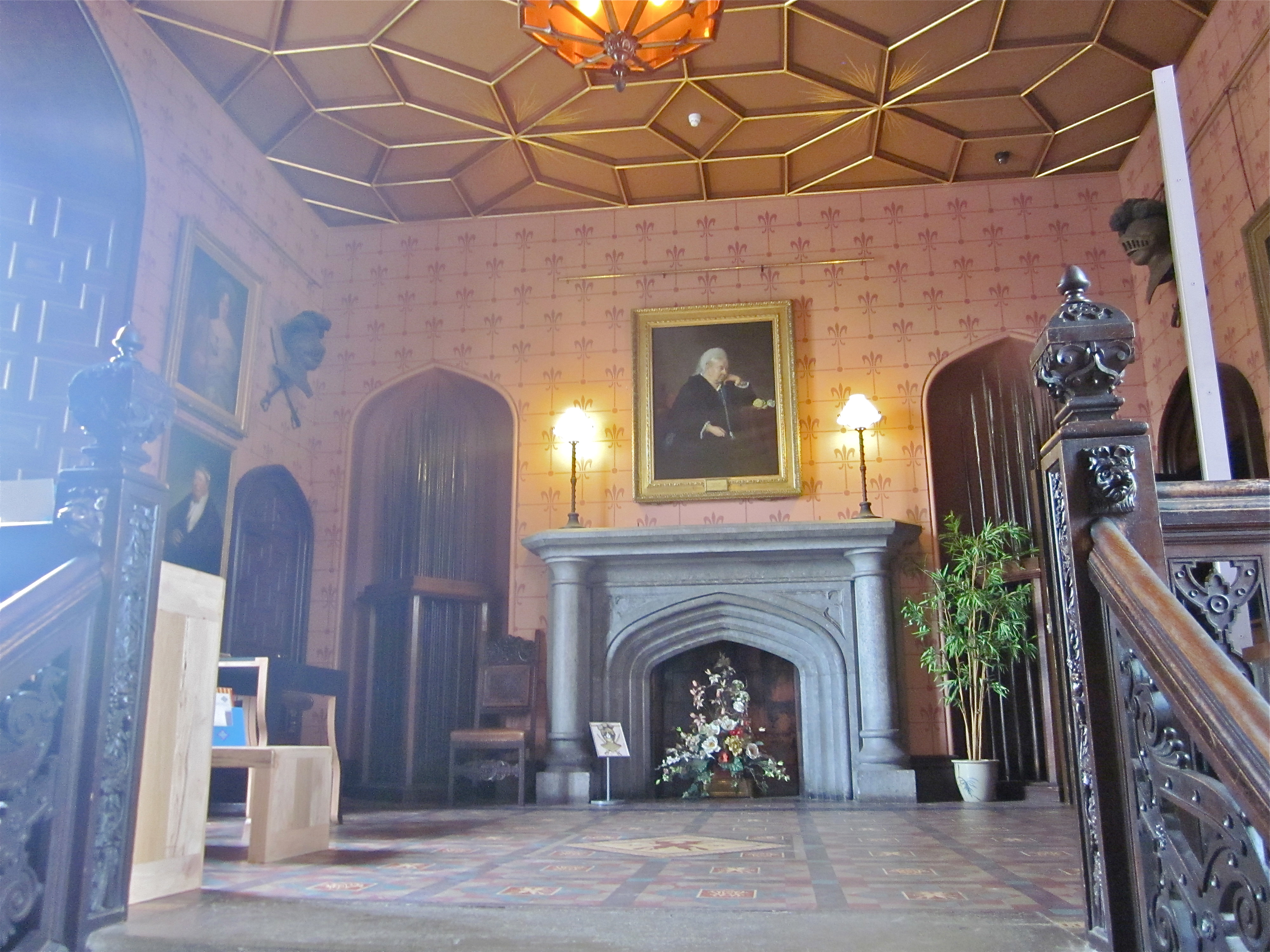
Bodelwyddan Castle, Entrance Staircase with Gothic detailing. c. 1802 and later.

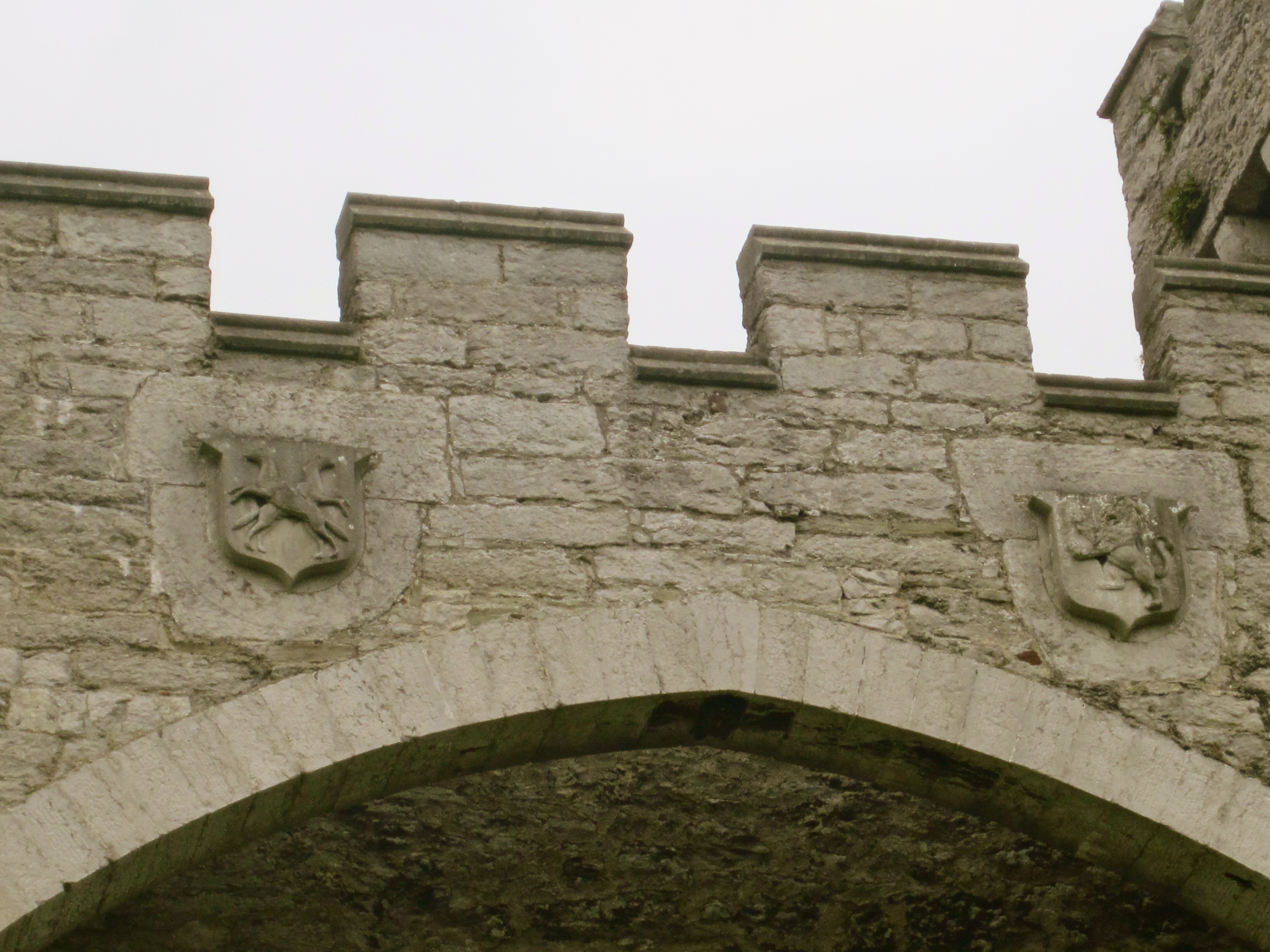
Bodelwyddan Castle, Williams Arms over archway towards gardens.

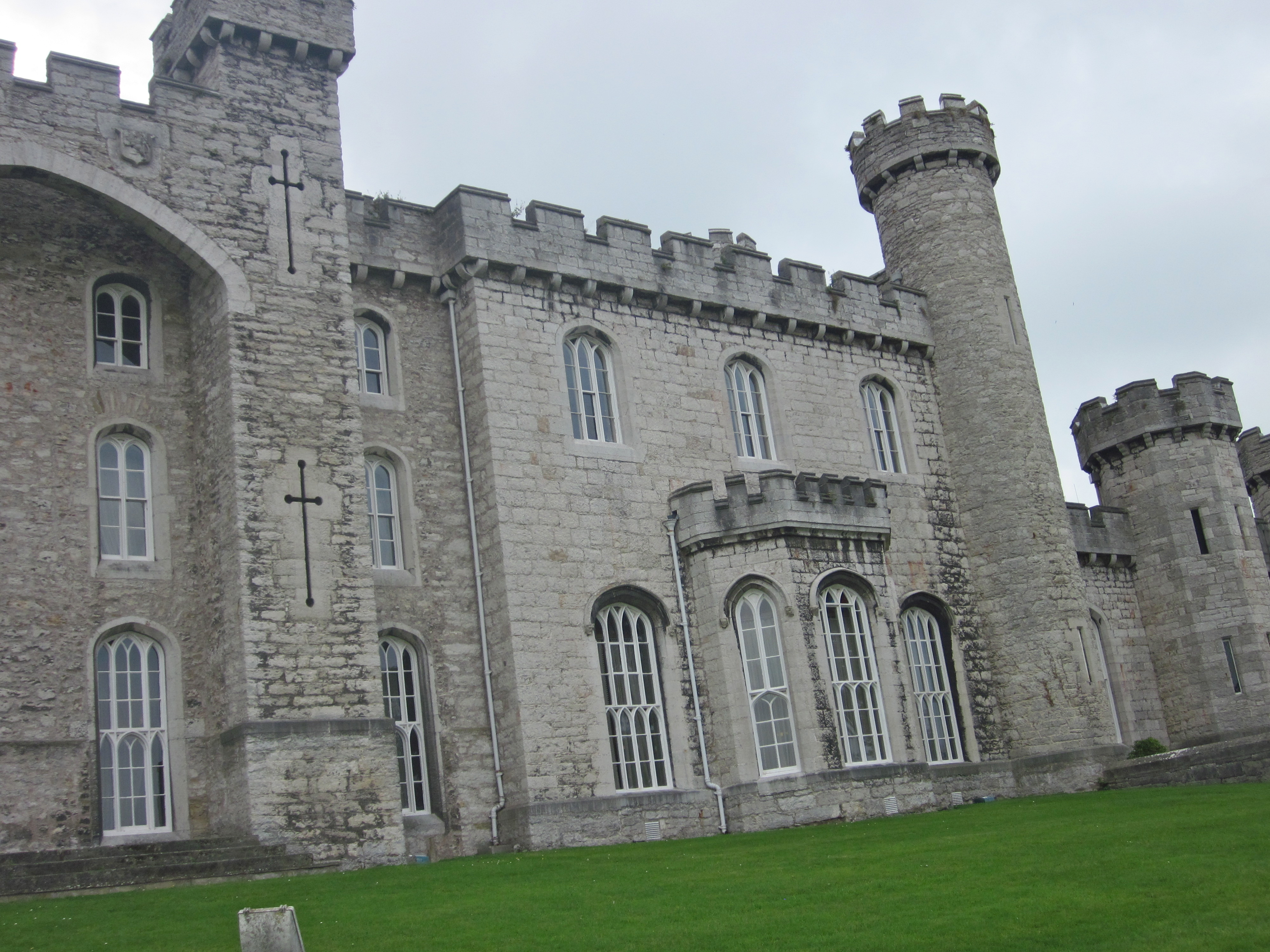
Bodelwyddan Castle Gothic wing added 1802–1808.

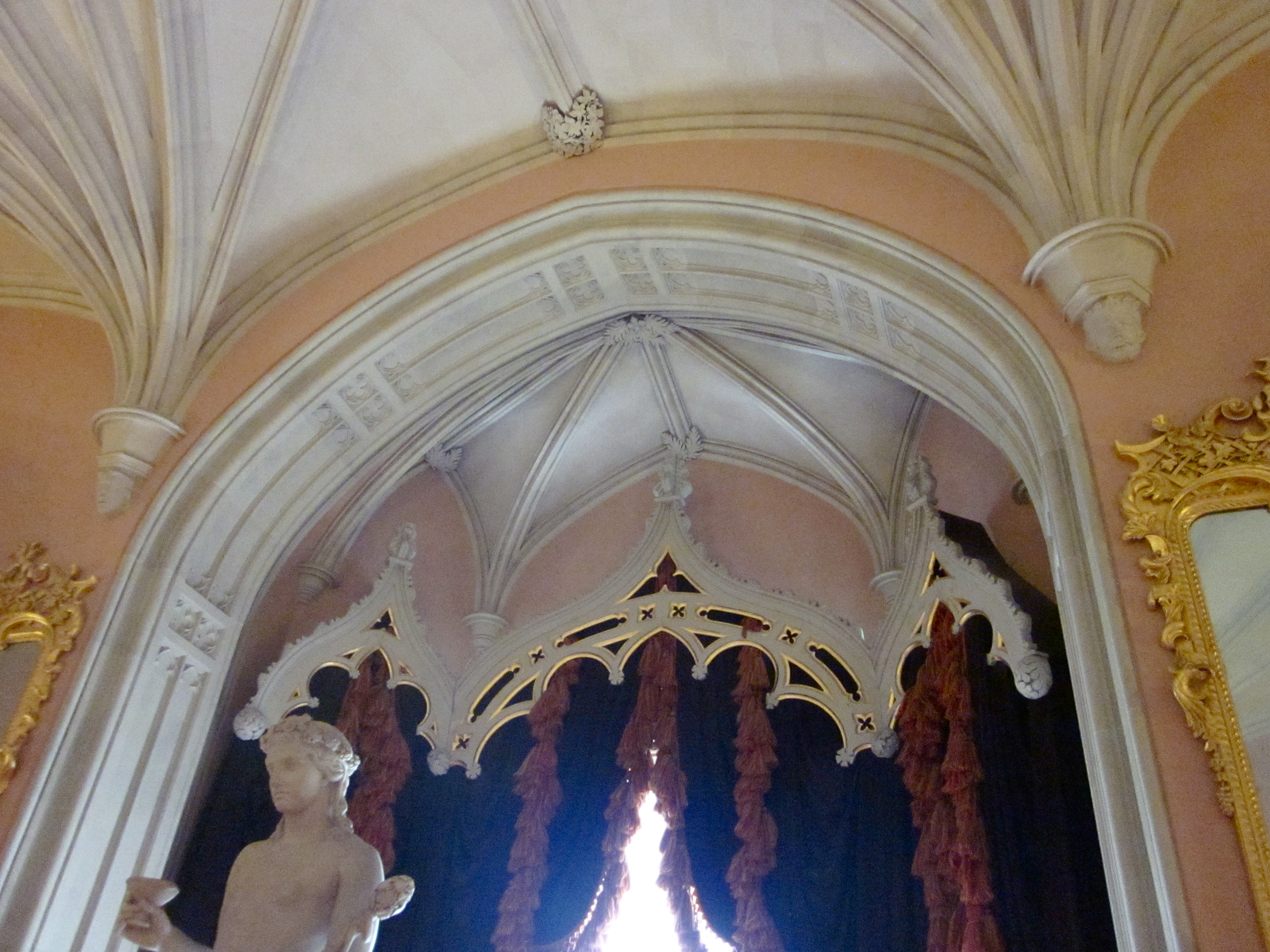
Bodelwyddan Castle Gothic window alcove 1802–1808.

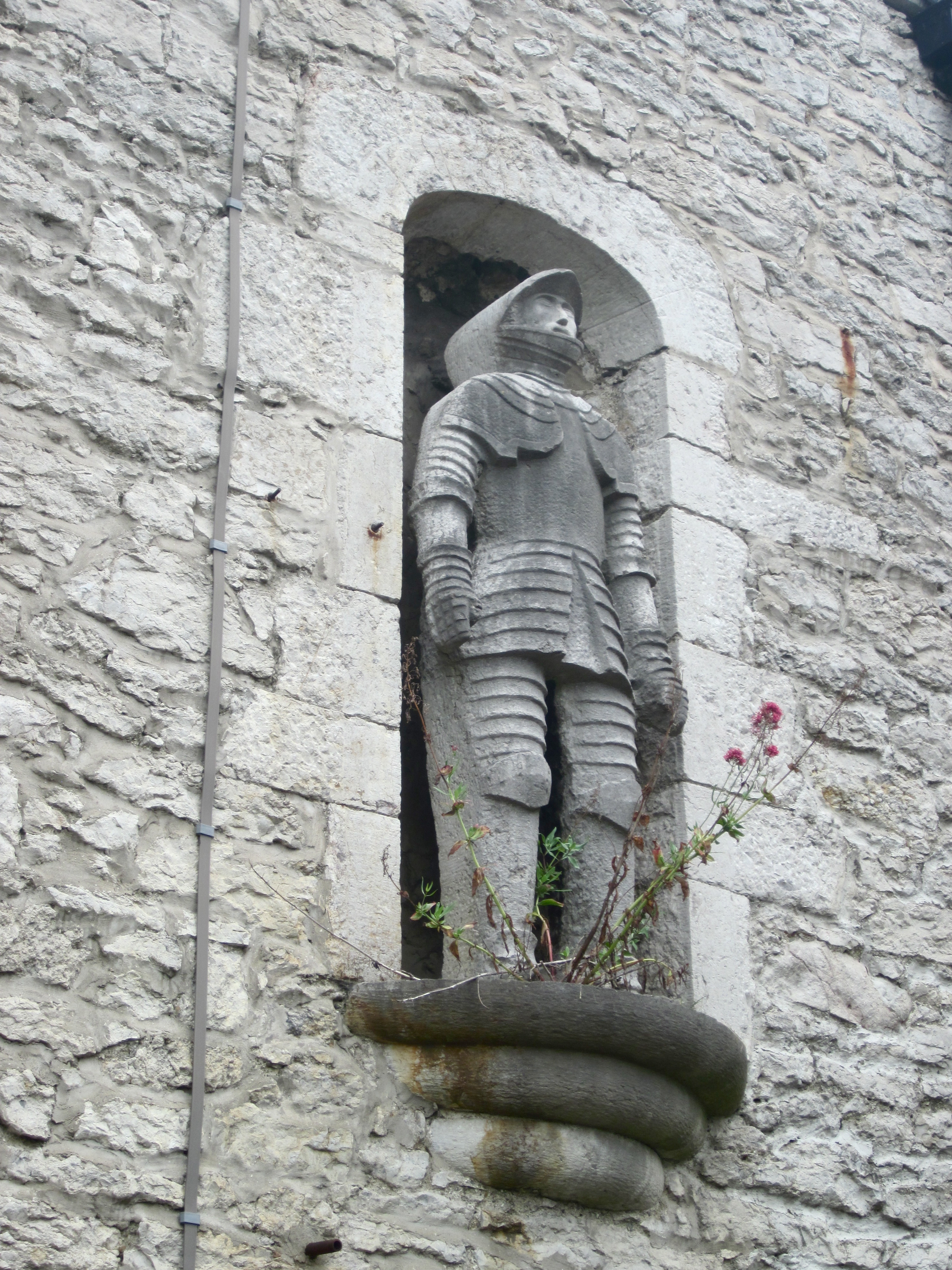
Bodelwyddan Castle, Medieval knight on NE facade c. 1840.

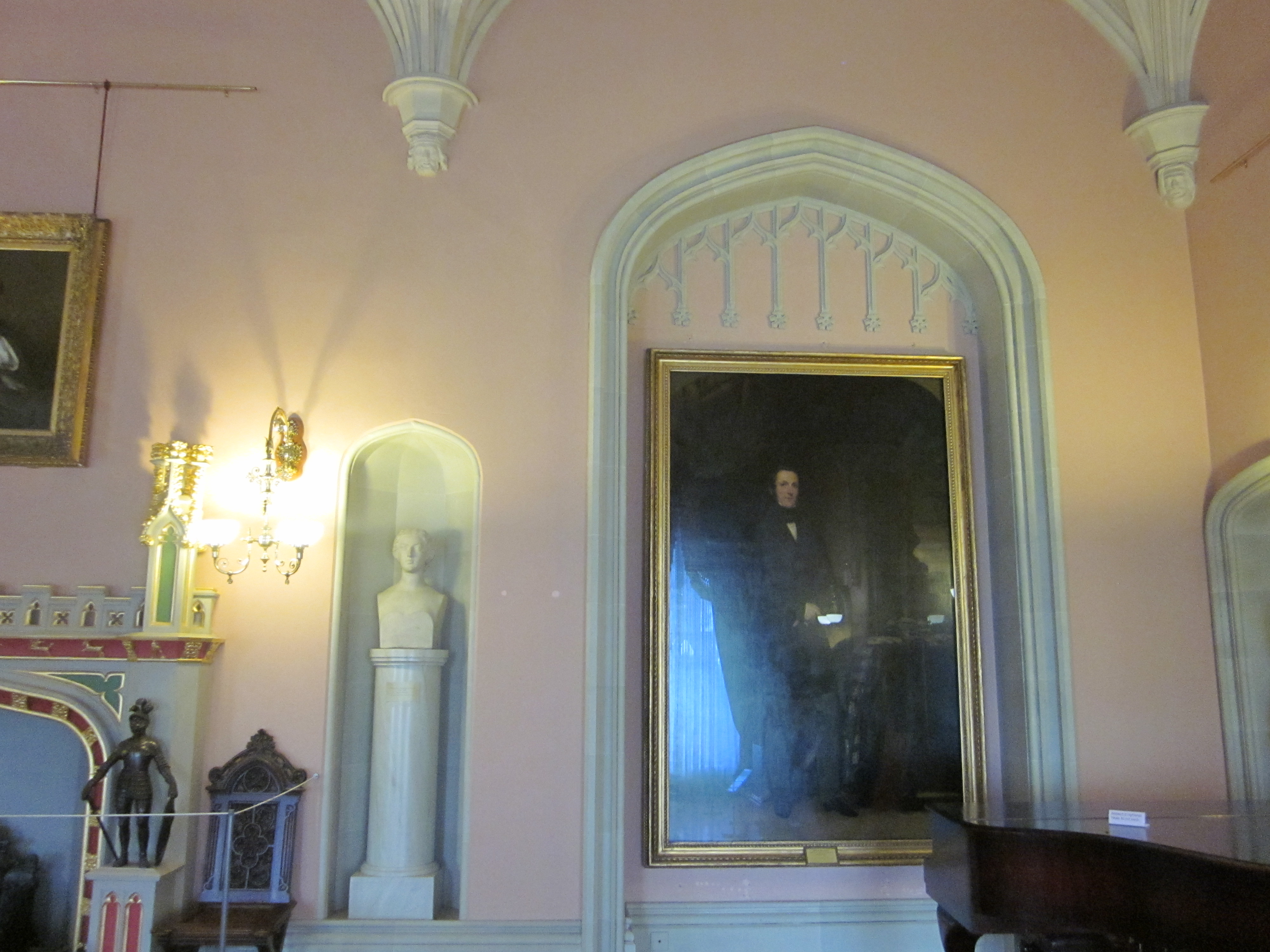
Bodelwyddan Castle, Detail in Gothic room, mainly 1802–1808.

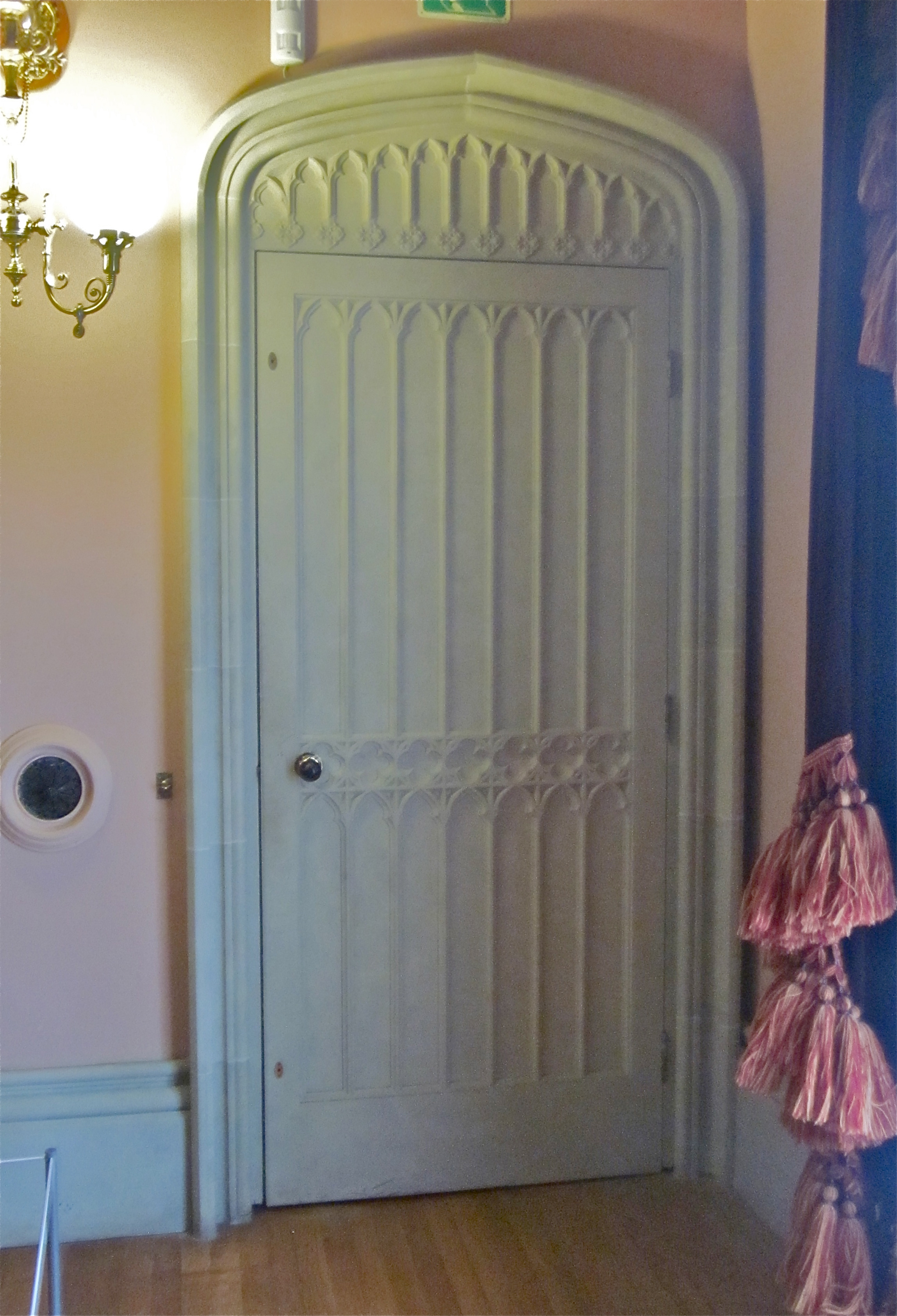
Bodelwyddan Castle Doorin Gothic room, mainly 1802–1808.

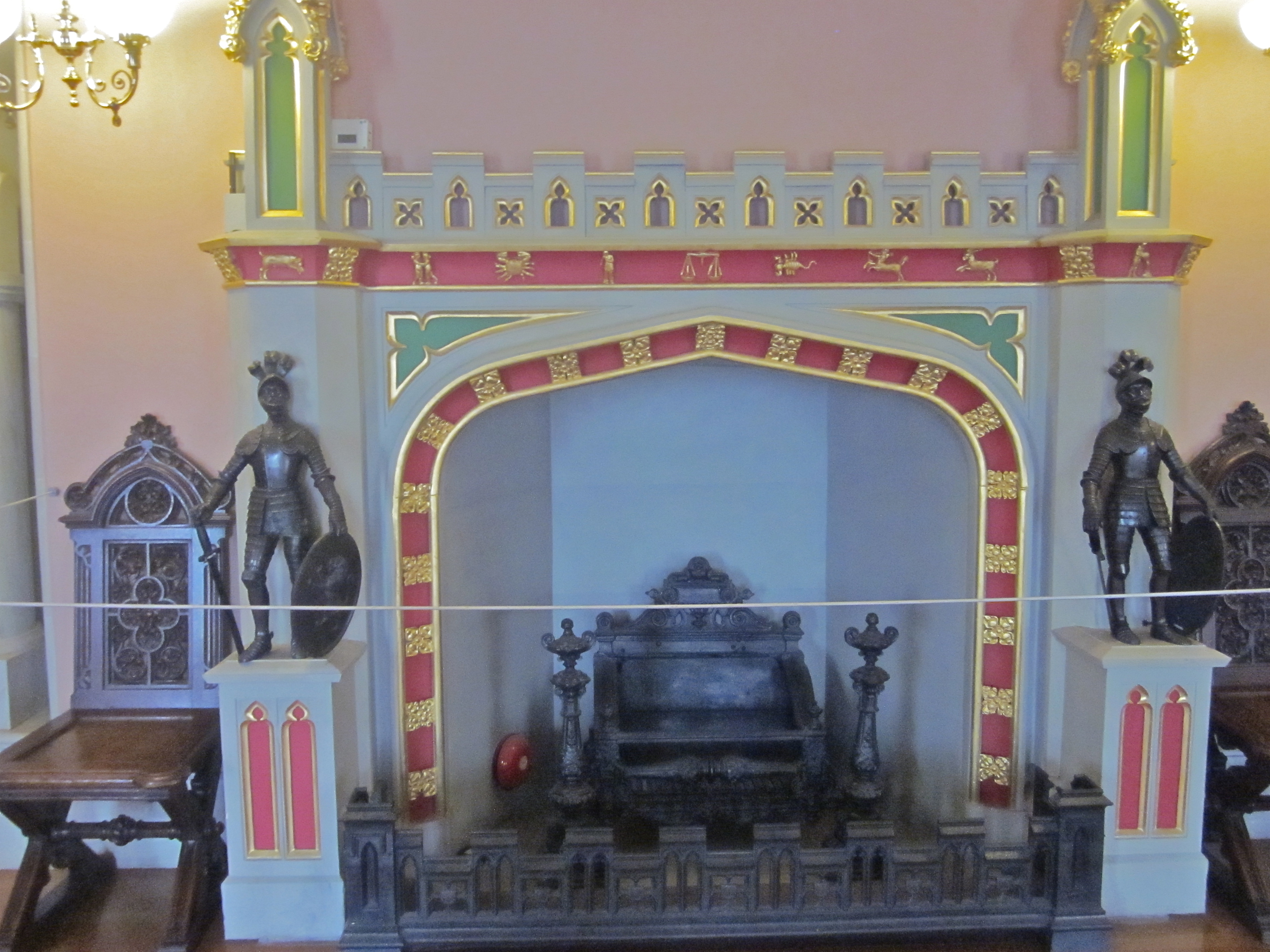
Bodelwyddan Castle Gothic fireplace.

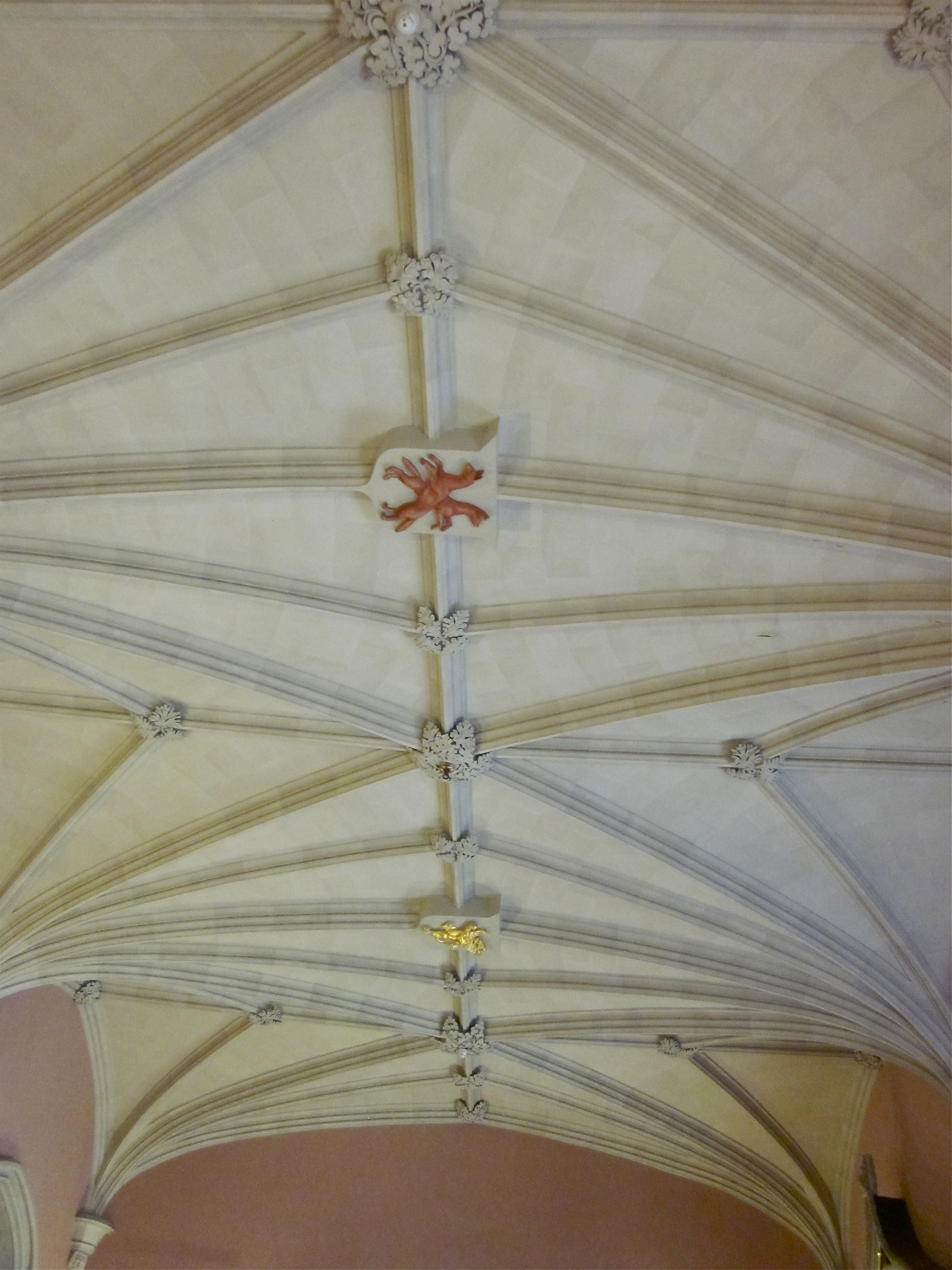
Bodelwyddan Castle. Gothic revival ceiling 1802–1808 with Williams family crossed foxes.

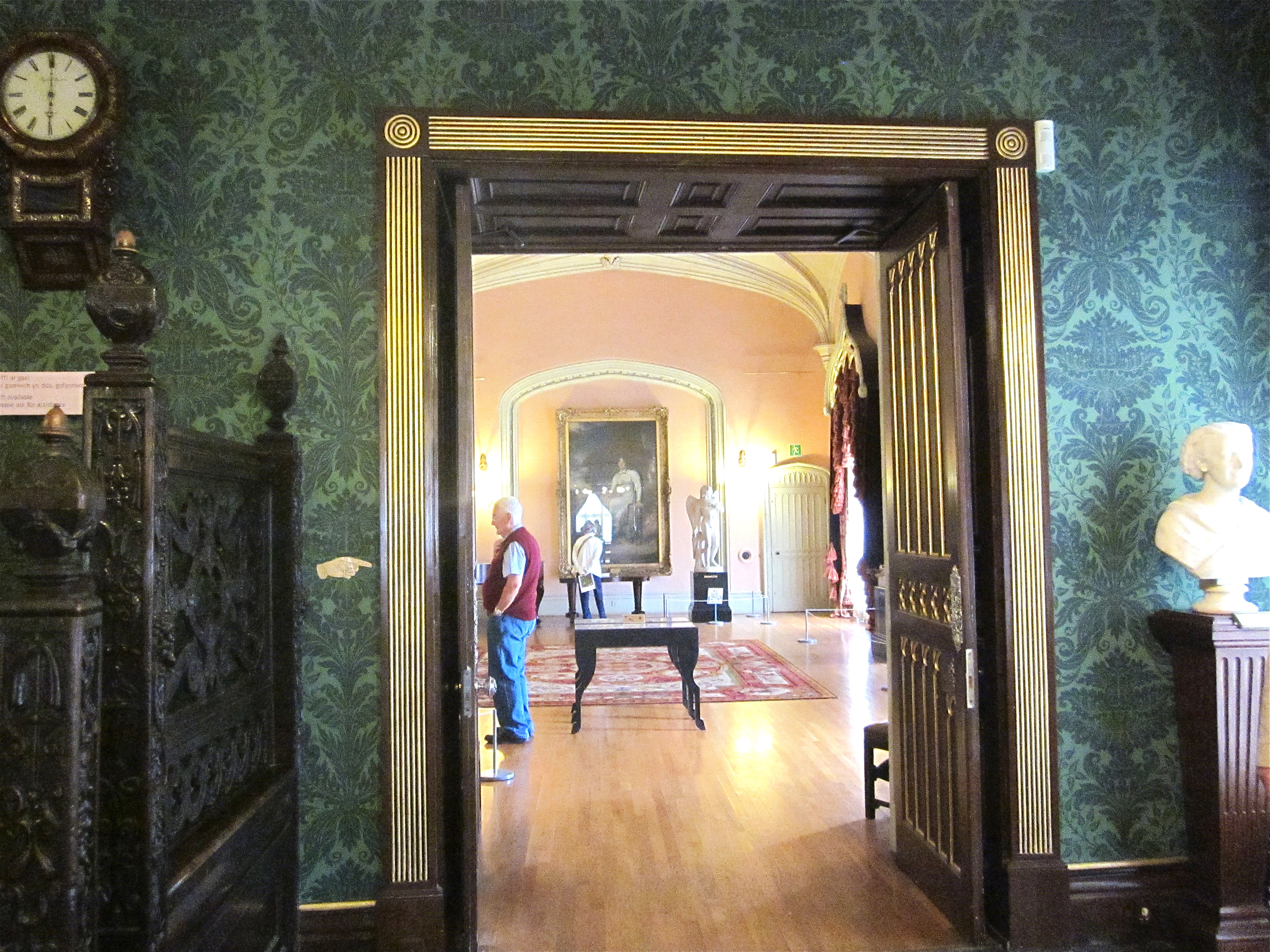
Bodelwyddan Castle Greek revival doorway to Gothic room.

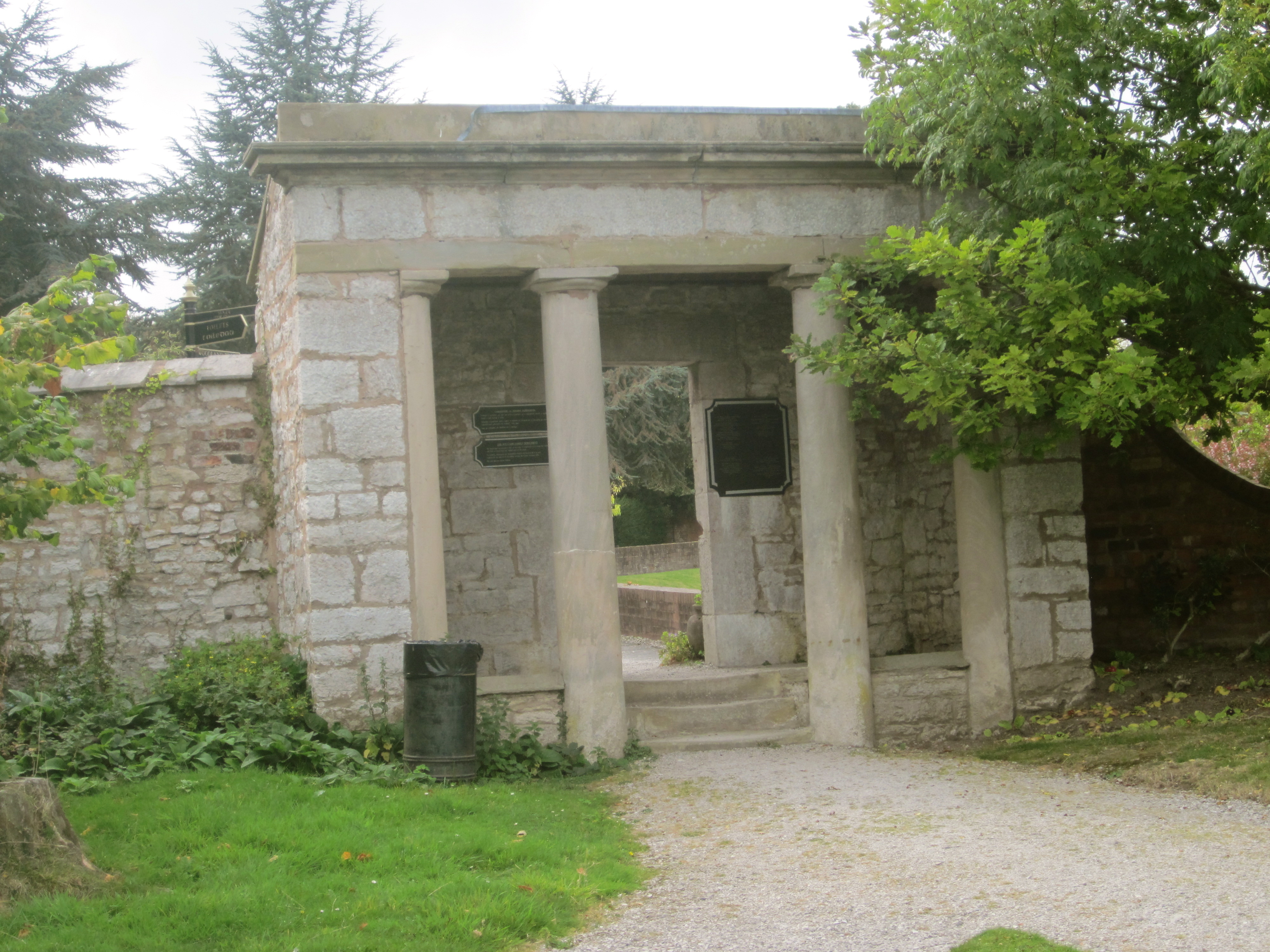
Bodelwyddan Castle Garden entrance by Thomas Mawson.

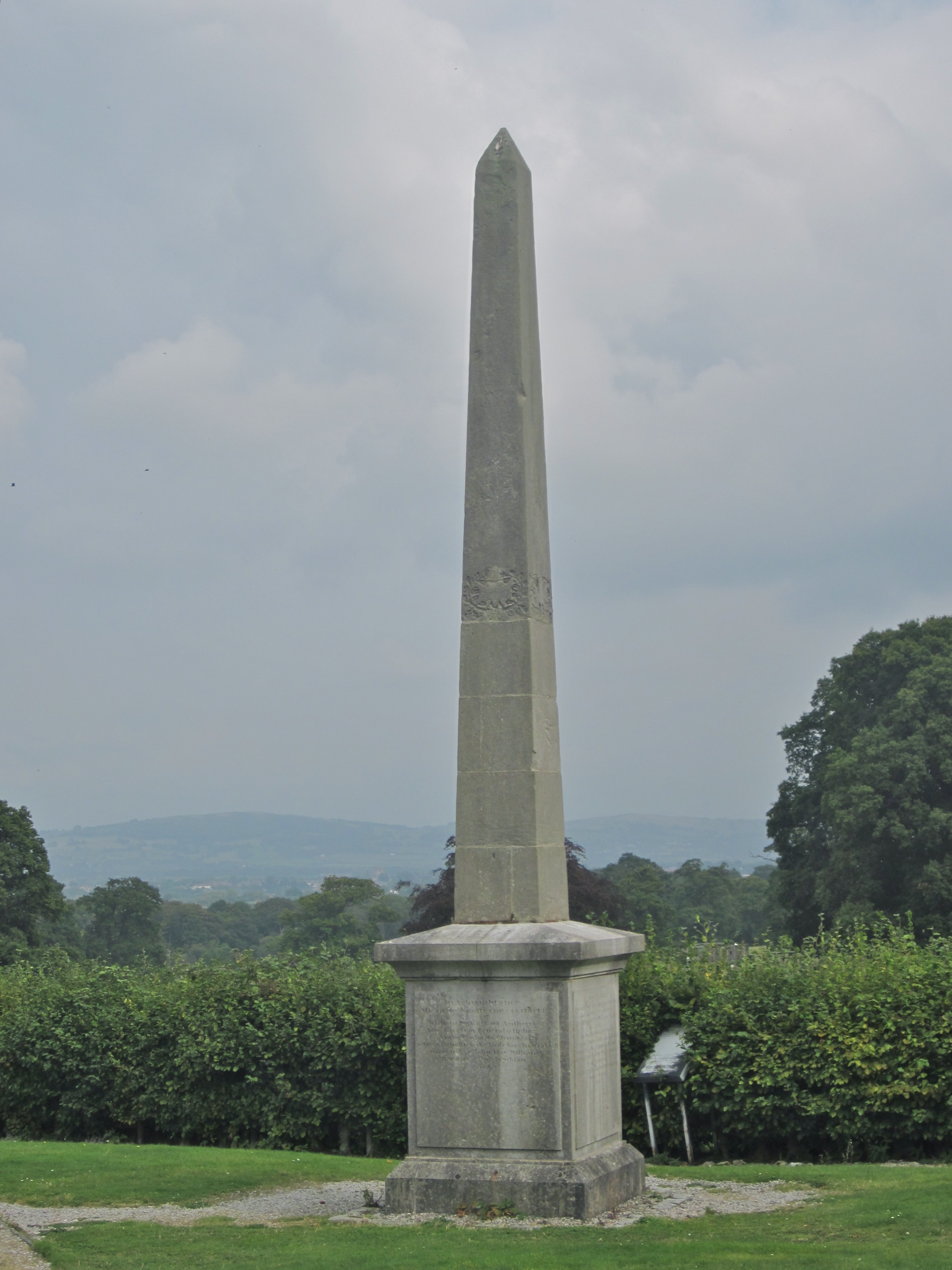
Bodelwyddan Castle. Obelisk in Garden.

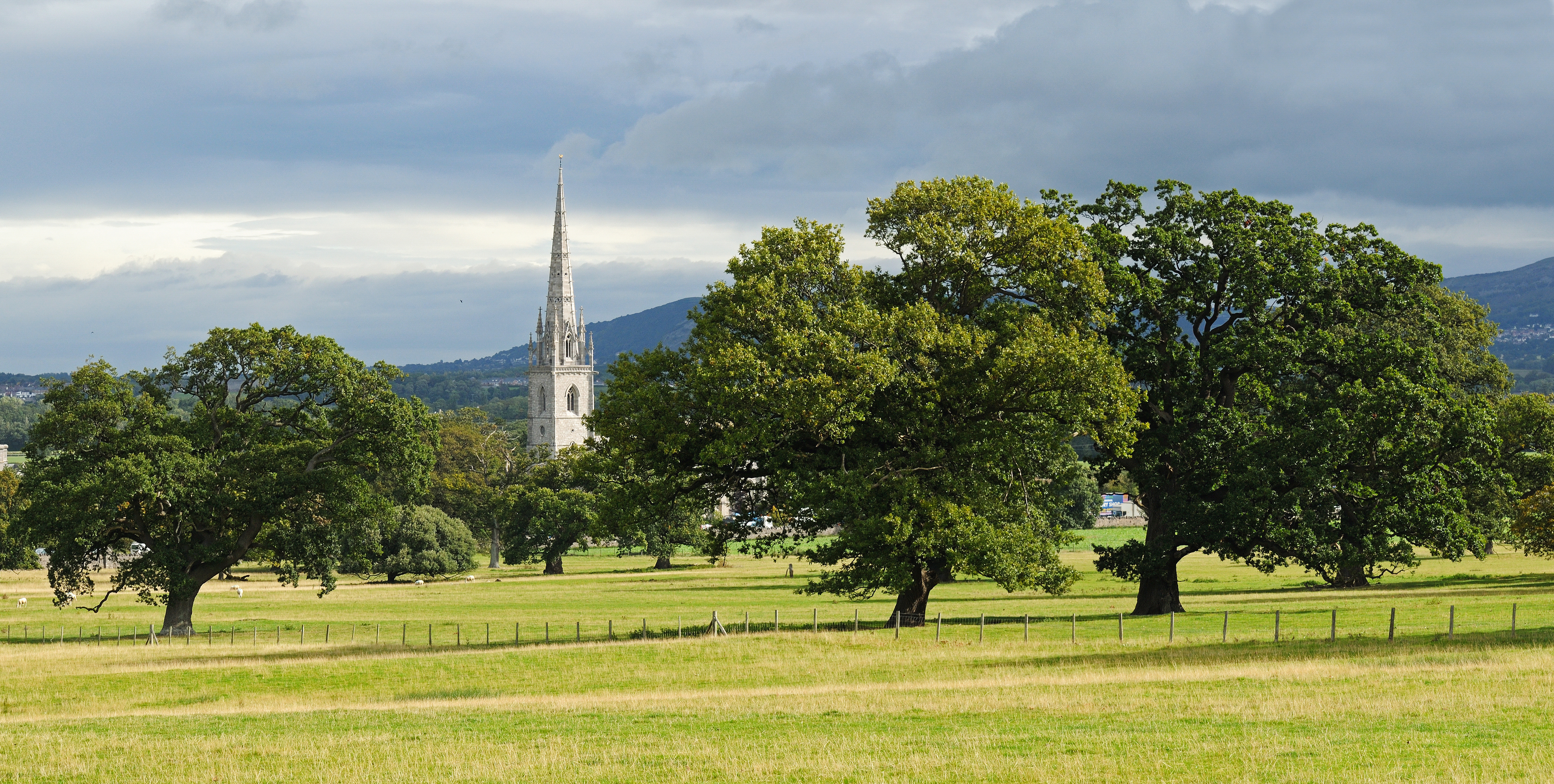
View of the St Margaret of Antioch's Church from the Bodelwyddan Castle.

== See also ==
- List of castles in Wales
- Castles in Great Britain and Ireland
- List of gardens in Wales

== Literature ==
- Foister, Susan (1988). The National Portrait Gallery at Bodelwyddan Castle. London: National Portrait Gallery Publications. ISBN 0904017923.
- Hubbard, E. (1986). Buildings of Wales: Clwyd. Penguin/Yale University Press. pg. 325.
