= Allied Schools (United Kingdom) =

English association of independent schools

- Type: Non-governmental organization
- Purpose: Educational accreditation
- Website: alliedschools.org.uk

The Allied Schools constitute an association of independent schools in England. Formerly known as the Church of England Trust, it was established in 1923 when the Revd. Percy Warrington, vicar of Monkton Combe founded Canford School in Dorset, and Stowe School in Buckinghamshire.

== Overview ==
The organisation grew to 10 schools in Britain and a girls' school in Kenya. The trustees of the schools were then all trustees of the Martyrs' Memorial and Church of England Trust. When the schools ran into severe financial difficulties during the Great Depression, they were rescued by mortgages from the Legal and General Assurance Society, but under a new management scheme in 1934 the Martyrs' Trust was permitted to nominate only one sixth of the governors of schools. The loans were finally repaid in 1980, when a revised scheme of management was agreed, creating the Allied Schools Council.

== Membership ==
The association offers two levels of membership – Associate, and Full. Associate members get support from the organisation's head office in Banbury, Oxfordshire in return for an annual fee. In this way the organisation offers an insurance policy against difficult times, as well as administrative support. They also act as a network between schools for the purpose of sharing information and ideas. Full members get the same benefits, as well as support when they need it from other full members.

== Member ==
Current members are:

- Canford School, Dorset
- Stowe School, Buckinghamshire
- Harrogate Ladies' College, Yorkshire
- Westonbirt School, Gloucestershire
- Wrekin College, Shropshire

The organisation is run by a Council, which is independently chaired and members include the chairmen of full member schools.
