= Sidney Crawford =

Australian businessman (1885–1968)

Sidney Crawford (4 November 1885 – 14 May 1968) was a South Australian businessman born in Victoria.

== History ==
Edward James Frederick Crawford (c. 1808 – 15 May 1880), at one time a prosperous brewer associated with the Hindmarsh Brewery. He was also a serious trader in real estate, but went bankrupt in the recession that accompanied the drought of 1864–1867 and in 1868 moved with his wife, three sons and a daughter to Victoria, out of reach of his creditors.

His eldest son James John Crawford (7 February 1848 – 17 October 1926) had a privileged childhood in Adelaide, living in North Adelaide and educated at St. Peter's College. An accountant, he moved to Whanganui, New Zealand, where he married, then to Warrnambool and Ararat where, according to at least one reference he had a penurious existence. He then settled in Koroit, Victoria, serving as secretary of the local Racing Club, in 1896 part-owner of the Koroit Sentinel (previously that paper's reporter and sub-editor), longtime secretary of the Mechanics' Institute, from 1909 or earlier served as Commonwealth Electoral Registrar for the region, appointed JP in 1914. He was organist for the town's Church of England for 35 years.

Sidney Crawford, fourth son of James John Crawford, was born in Warrnambool, Victoria, attended Koroit School, and around 1900 won a scholarship to Surrey College on Union Road, Surrey Hills, some 300 km away, near Melbourne. He found employment with the E S & A bank and within a few years was manager of their Elsternwick, Victoria branch. By 1914 he had a residence in Murrumbeena. In 1917 he enlisted with the First AIF, following his brother into Motor Transport, and served in France with the 4th Australian Motor Transport Company and demobbed in 1919, when he accepted a position as manager of Tarrant Motors, at that time Melbourne's largest new car retailer.

In 1922 he moved to Adelaide, and with L. M. Anderson and F. R. Burden founded a Fiat agency. He purchased a home in Brighton, South Australia, where he lived until his death.

In 1926 he founded Adelaide Car Service Limited with a capitalisation of £50,000 in £1 shares for he purpose of taking over Adelaide Motors Limited and All-British Motor House Limited, and had the agency for Austin, Albion and Maudslay vehicles. In 1927 Adelaide Motors opened a new showroom and workshop at 67–69 Franklin Street. He was in 1934 founder and managing director of Commercial Motor Vehicles Ltd in Flinders Street. Vehicles handled included Leyland, Diamond T and REO.

== St Jude's Church, Brighton ==
Crawford was an adherent of the Church of England and a longtime worshipper at St Jude's Church, Brighton. The church building was considerably damaged in the Adelaide earthquake of 1 March 1954, and plans were made to have it demolished and replaced with something more modern. This was strongly resisted by Crawford, who found numerous allies in his determination to save the 100-year-old building.

He threatened (in the nicest possible way) to go to the State's Supreme Court if necessary to avert its destruction. This, in fact, did occur, and the Supreme Court found for its preservation.

== Other activities ==
- He was chairman of the motor section of the Association of British Manufacturers
- In 1928 he was appointed to the (SA Government) Motor Transport Control Board
- He was a member of the council of the Taxpayers' Association of South Australia from 1929 to 1941.
- He was in 1929 founding chairman of the Junior Legacy Committee.
- In 1930 he was appointed a Harbors Board Commissioner, still active on the committee 20 years later, and chairman from 1946.
- He was a board member of the South Australian branch of the Economic Society
- He appeared on various scientific and technical boards and on occasion acted as host to visiting academics.
- He was a founding member of the think-tank Common Cause.
- He regularly contributed articulate and thoughtful essays to the newspapers on topics as diverse as transport, employment and economics, to divorce and an obituary for his friend, the economist Professor L. F. Giblin.
- He was a director of Howard Frederick Hobbs' Hobbs Gearless Drive Limited
- He was the author of Hauling for Profit, foreword by W. G. T. Goodman.
- Board member War Workers Housing Trust (that put hostel for 200 women workers of Dr. L. J. Dunstone's property at Woodville) and the associated Commonwealth Housing Trust.
- He was an executive officer with the Commercial Finance Co., Ltd., which specialised in financing motor vehicle purchases.
- He was a member of the Royal South Australian Yacht Squadron.
- In 1947 he founded the C.M.V. Foundation, which supported the kindergarten movement and public libraries. The Crawford Room of the Mortlock Wing of the State Library was named in his honour.

== Family ==
Edward James Frederick Crawford (7 December 1809 – 15 May 1880) Adelaide brewer married (1) Mary Ann Scott (2) Frances Mitchell ( – 1 April 1877) in Sydney on 31 July 1841.

- James John Crawford (7 February 1848 – 17 October 1926) married Ruth Harding (1859 – 17 February 1946) of Wanganui, New Zealand, on 15 November 1879? 25 November 1880?. They lived Wanganui, then Commercial Road, Koroit, Victoria, then Brighton, South Australia. In 1896 he wrote a prize-winning story for Melbourne Punch. Both James and Ruth died in Brighton, South Australia. Their seven sons were:

- Edward James Frederick Crawford (c. 1881? – ) married Margaret Elizabeth Gray of Horsham, Victoria on 30 May 1907. Named identically to his grandfather, he was bank manager with the National Bank at Koroit, Angaston, Eudunda, Strathalbyn, Wagga Wagga, Albury Bendigo and Prahran, playing organ at several of the earlier towns' Congregational churches. Not to be confused with a contemporary, related, identically named Melbourne architect.
- Lindsay Tremlett Crawford (27 April 1882 – 2 December 1973) married Eugenie Laugier on 15 April 1911, lived in Tocumwal, New South Wales
- George Crawford (c. 1884? – ) living at 90 Warrigal Road, Surrey Hills in 1951.
- Sidney Crawford (4 November 1885 – 14 May 1968) married Elsie Mary Allen on 10 September 1920. Their children included:

- James Allen "Jim" Crawford (1922–1999) married Josephine Margaret Bond (1925– ) of Clare on 30 November 1946. Jim succeeded his father as managing director of the conglomerate of companies, and in philanthropic work. He was a member of the Libraries Board of South Australia from 1972 and was chairman from 1977 to 1987. The Jim Crawford Award for librarianship commemorates his work.
- Frances Mary Crawford (1923– )
- Diana Frances Mary Crawford (1923– ) married Thomas William Whitton of Sydney in 1950
- Jocelyn Elizabeth Crawford (1924–1988)

- Rev. Norman Crawford (died 1968?), psychologist and curate of Koroit was ordained an Anglican priest in 1915. He served at Ouyen, Dimboola, Sea Lake, Plympton and at Glenelg. He campaigned against flogging and capital punishment; a Howard League member noted for his opposition to the hanging of Max Stuart. He wrote an ancillary verse to the National Anthem.
- Arthur Crawford (c. May 1893 – ) bank clerk, served in France with the Motor Transport Service; married Estella Helena Mitchell, daughter of Lt.-Col. C. Ashmore Mitchell VD (1862–1941). Arthur was still alive 1946.
- Francis "Doc" Crawford (c. March 1895 – 30 August 1913)

They had a home at 22 Seaview Terrace, Brighton. For further information see Hindmarsh Brewery#Crawford family.
